= ADS Group =

UK aerospace, defence, security and space trade association

ADS Group Limited
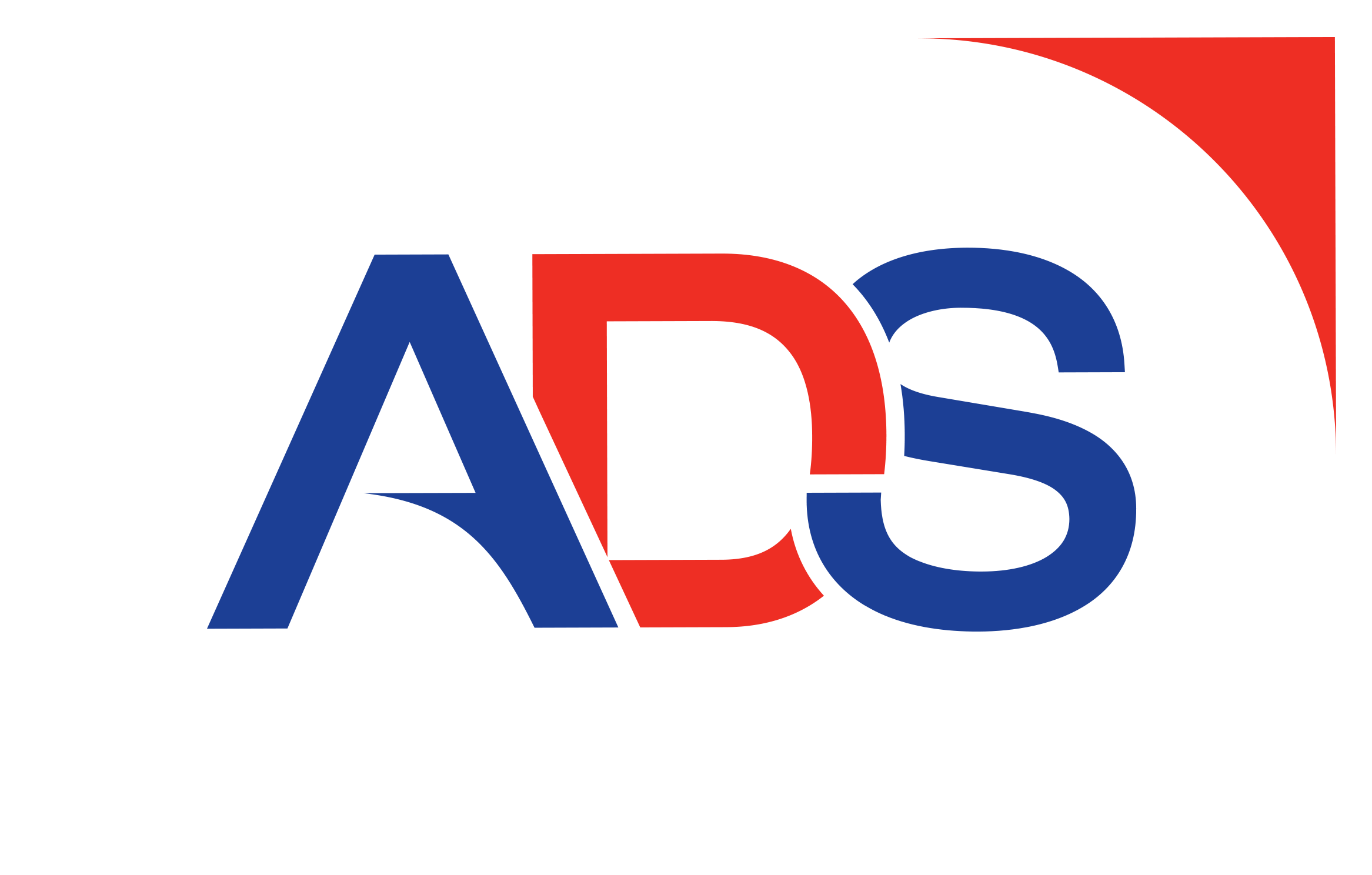
- Abbreviation: ADS
- Formation: 11 September 2009
- Type: Trade association
- Legal status: Private company
- Purpose: Promoting the aerospace, defence, security and space industries of the United Kingdom
- Location: Salamanca Square, 9 Albert Embankment, London
- Region served: UK
- Members: 1,100+ Aerospace, Defence, Security and Space companies based in the United Kingdom
- Chief Executive: Kevin Craven
- President: David Lockwood OBE
- Subsidiaries: Farnborough International Limited
- Affiliations: AeroSpace and Defence Industries Association of Europe (ASD)
- Website: adsgroup.org.uk

ADS Group Limited, informally known as ADS, is the trade organisation representing the aerospace, defence, security and space industries in the United Kingdom. It has more than 1,000 member companies across its sectors, including some of the UK's largest manufacturers, like Airbus, Rolls-Royce, BAE Systems, Meggitt PLC and GKN.

Its subsidiary Farnborough International Limited runs the biennial Farnborough Air Show, one of the world's biggest air shows, and other events.

== History ==
ADS Group Limited was incorporated on 11 September 2009 as a private, limited by guarantee, no share capital company registered in the United Kingdom with company number 07016635.

It was formed from the merger of the Association of Police and Public Security Suppliers (APPSS), the Defence Manufacturers Association (DMA) and the Society of British Aerospace Companies (SBAC).

== Activities ==
ADS activities are focussed on supporting UK manufacturing and its industries supply chains, contributing to policy debates of importance to its industries, encouraging investments in technology and innovation, supporting business development, and enhancing the profile of its sectors. Its current published priority issues are around developing industrial strategy, productivity supply chain improvements, public procurement, and delivering net zero carbon by 2050.

Farnborough International Limited, which runs the Farnborough Airshow, is a wholly owned subsidiary of ADS. ADS also encompasses the British Aviation Group (BAG).

The organization participates in joint initiatives between industry and Government, including the Aerospace Growth Partnership and Defence Growth Partnership. It leads the National Aerospace Technology Exploitation Programme (NATEP), supported by funding from the Aerospace Technology Institute, aimed at helping UK supply chain companies develop innovative technologies.

ADS is the largest member and contributor to the Aerospace and Defence Industries Association of Europe (ASD), the trade association representing Aerospace, Defence and Space in Europe.

It publishes a quarterly magazine covering its four sectors, ADS Advance, and annual economic outlook reports on the UK aerospace, defence and security sectors.

=== Events ===
ADS coordinates UK Pavilions for UK companies exhibiting at international shows such as Paris Air Show and Singapore Air Show. The 2017 Paris Air Show saw 88 UK companies exhibiting in the UK Pavilion, while 150 companies exhibited in the 2017 UK Pavilion at DSEI.

It also runs the annual United Kingdom Aerospace Youth Rocketry Challenge, a competition for secondary school student teams. The UK national champions compete in the International Rocketry Challenge against winners of the US, French and Japanese competitions. The International Rocketry Challenge final is held at the Farnborough Airshow or Paris Air Show in alternating years.

ADS holds an Annual Dinner for member companies and invited guests, and since 2015 has held an annual reception in Parliament for apprentices from across its member companies.

=== Special Interest Groups ===
ADS has more than 30 Special Interest Groups formed of members with similar professional specialisms. All groups deliver activities that are led by members, and cover areas including aerospace exports, aircraft interiors, maritime, training and simulation, and environmental issues.

=== Offices ===
The head office is situated on the Albert Embankment (A3036), on the opposite side of the Thames to Millbank Tower, and next to the headquarters of the London Fire Brigade and the United Nations' International Maritime Organization, east of Lambeth Bridge.

It also has offices in

- Farnborough
- Edinburgh
- Belfast
- Toulouse, France

== Governance ==
ADS is overseen by the ADS Board, comprising the President, Chief Executive and representatives of member companies. Day-to-day operations are the responsibility of the Executive Team. A number of Boards and Committees oversee specific areas of work, such as membership, business ethics, and civil aviation safety.

The ADS Chief Executive is Kevin Craven, who took up the post in April 2021, succeeding Paul Everitt, Chief Executive from 2013 to 2021. The current President is David Lockwood OBE, Chief Executive Officer at Babcock International Group. Previous Presidents include Julian Whitehead, Executive Vice-President Global Business and Strategic Programmes of Airbus Defence & Space, Tony Wood (British businessman), Chief Executive of Meggitt PLC and former Rolls-Royce senior executive Colin Smith.

== Membership ==
Membership is made up of more than 1,000 UK registered businesses. Companies include:

- Airbus UK
- Atkins
- BAE Systems
- Boeing UK
- Daher Aerospace
- Leonardo UK
- GE Aviation
- General Dynamics UK
- GKN
- Marshall Aerospace and Defence Group
- Messier-Dowty
- Meggitt PLC
- Qinetiq
- Raytheon Systems
- Rolls-Royce Holdings
- Serco
- Spirit AeroSystems
- Thales Air Defence

== Annual Dinner ==
Each year ADS hosts an Annual Dinner for member companies from across its four sectors, and invited guests from across industry, politics, the armed forces, government and the media.

The 8th ADS Annual Dinner in 2017 was addressed by ADS & Airbus President Paul Kahn - who spoke about the impact of Brexit on the ADS industries and about the Single Source Regulatory Office (SSRO) - and by former UK foreign secretary William Hague.

The 2018 Annual Dinner, the 9th edition of the event, was held on 15 January in London. It drew more than 900 attendees, with speeches from ADS President Colin P. Smith, and Airbus Chief Executive Tom Enders. A charity collection for SSAFA – the Armed Forces Charity, raised more than £13,000 in donations.

In 2019, speakers included Colin P. Smith, BAE Systems Chief Executive Charles Woodburn and former Home Secretary Alan Johnson.

The 2020 Annual Dinner was addressed by the newly appointed ADS President Tony Wood and Rolls-Royce Chief Executive Warren East, who both spoke about the importance of the aviation industry addressing the challenges posed by climate change and acting firmly to cut carbon emissions, as well as the value of industrial strategy partnership between industry and Government. The after-dinner speaker was Eliza Manningham-Buller the former Director-General of MI5, while the dinner was also addressed by speakers from Armed Forces charity SSAFA and Invictus UK.

There was no 2021 Annual Dinner due to the Covid pandemic. ADS instead held a virtual event, ADS Live, with speakers including Kwasi Kwarteng, Deborah Haynes and Interim Chief Executive Kevin Craven.

== See also ==
- Aerospace manufacturer
- Space industry
- Farnborough Airshow
- UK Space Agency
- Intellect (trade association)
- Arms industry
- UK Cyber Security Community
