= Dunlop (brands) =

British brand

- Product type: Tyres, sports equipment, adhesives
- Current owner: Sumitomo Rubber Industries (consumer tyres, sports equipment, and the trademark); Liberty Hall Capital Partners (aircraft tyres); Ardex (adhesives); Hevea B.V. (protective footwear); Alfagomma Group (hoses)
- Country: United Kingdom
- Introduced: 1888; 138 years ago
- Markets: Worldwide
- Previous owners: Dunlop Ltd (1888–1985)
- Website: www.dunlop.com

Dunlop is a brand of tyre originally produced by the Dunlop Pneumatic Tyre Company from the end of the 19th century, taking its name from John Boyd Dunlop. The brand is used for many other products made from rubber or with rubber components and some with a looser connection to rubber.

Ownership of the brand has become fragmented over the years. Three main events contributed to this fragmentation:

- in 1899, the Dunlop company sold its Australian branch. As a result, Dunlop Australia acquired the rights to the brand in Australia;
- in 1985, Dunlop Rubber sold the rights to the Dunlop brand of automobile tyre, following several bad business decisions, including a disastrous joint venture with Pirelli where Dunlop unwittingly took responsibility for significant debts;
- between 1996 and 1998, BTR plc (which acquired Dunlop Rubber in 1985) sold a number of companies which used the Dunlop brand for their products.

== Dunlop brands ==
Currently, the Dunlop brand and logo is largely reunified under the ownership of Sumitomo Rubber Industries. Various companies market products with the "flying D" logo or incorporate the word Dunlop in their trading name.

=== Automobile ===
- Dunlop Tyres:
  - operations in Australia, Europe, New Zealand, and North America were managed by Goodyear (the result of dissolvement of global joint venture with Sumitomo in 2015), now transferred to Sumitomo in May 2025;
  - owned by Sumitomo in the rest of Asia (the result of the acquisition from Dunlop Rubber in 1985); the operations in Malaysia, Singapore, and Brunei, originally managed by Continental AG, now transferred to Sumitomo in 2026;
  - owned by Sumitomo in Africa (the result of an acquisition in 2013 from Apollo Tyres of India, which had acquired the brand rights from BTR in 1998);
  - owned in India by the Ruia Group (the result of the sale of Dunlop India in 1984 to the Jumbo Group, which sold it on in 2005).
- Dunlop Garage Equipment, a subsidiary garage equipment manufacturer, owned by Nexion S.p.A., supplying vehicle servicing equipment for cars and commercial vehicles, based in Mytholmroyd, England.

=== Aerospace ===
- Dunlop Aircraft Tyres, a company in Birmingham, England (sold by BTR in 1996; 75% of stack was sold to AAC Capital Partners. AAC sold company to Liberty Hall Capital Partners for $135 Million).
- Dunlop Aerospace, including Dunlop Equipment and Dunlop Precision Rubber, owned by Meggitt plc (the result of a sale by BTR in 1998).

=== Construction materials ===
- Dunlop Adhesives, a brand of tile adhesive and grouting, owned by Ardex GmbH (the result of a sale by BTR in 1996).
- Dunlop Industries of Kenya, who produce PVC floor tiles (sold by BTR in 1996).
- Ardit Floor Leveler (cement based) for concrete or timber floors, to apply tiles, carpet or vinyl flooring.

=== Footwear ===
- Dunlop Protective Footwear, a brand of waterproof footwear and safety boots, owned by the Dutch company Hevea, which acquired the brand in 1996.

=== Furniture ===
- Dunlopillo, a brand of mattress and latex foam for furniture, owned in the UK by Steinhoff International, acquired in 2013 from Hilding Anders, which owns the brand in Scandinavia. Elsewhere, it was owned by Dunlop Latex Foam Ltd (sold by BTR in 1997) and now by several companies including the Pikolin group. They are also operating in Asian countries like Malaysia, China, Hong Kong, Singapore and Vietnam.

=== Industrial products ===
- Dunlop Conveyor Belting, part of Fenner Dunlop Conveyor Belting Worldwide, providing a range of conveyor belt systems. On March 19, 2018, Fenner PLC, the parent company of the 'Dunlop' and 'Fenner Dunlop' brands in the industrial and mining sector, was acquired by Michelin.
- Dunlop Extrusions, a brand of rubber extrusions owned by an independent company in Manchester, England.
- Dunlop Fabrications, a brand of flexible fuel and water tanks owned by Trelleborg AB of Sweden.
- Dunlop Hiflex
  - Type: Subsidiary
  - Industry: Manufacturing
  - Founded: 1969
  - Headquarters: Halmstad, Sweden
  - Area served: Scandinavia, Europe, North America
  - Products: Hydraulic hoses, industrial hoses, couplings, fluid-conveyance systems
  - Parent: Alfagomma Group
  - Website: www.dunlophiflex.com

Dunlop Hiflex is a Scandinavian manufacturer and supplier of hydraulic hoses, industrial hoses, couplings, and fluid-conveyance systems. The company is headquartered in Halmstad, Sweden, with operations across Sweden, Norway, Denmark, and Finland, and exports to several other European markets and the United States. Dunlop Hiflex is part of the Alfagomma Group, an Italian-based global manufacturer of industrial and hydraulic hose systems.

== History ==
The company's origins date back to 1969, when BTR AB was established in Sweden with a focus on industrial and hydraulic hose systems. The company later operated under the name Hiflex Sweden AB, supplying hydraulic and industrial hoses throughout Scandinavia.

In 2003, the company changed its name to Dunlop Hiflex AB to align with the Dunlop brand and reflect its broader product offering.

In 2005, Dunlop Hiflex became part of the Alfagomma Group, an Italian manufacturer of hydraulic and industrial hoses. The acquisition expanded Dunlop Hiflex's production capacity, logistics network, and research capabilities while integrating it into Alfagomma's global operations.

== Corporate structure ==
- Headquarters: Halmstad, Sweden
- Founded: 1969 (as BTR AB)
- Renamed: Dunlop Hiflex AB in 2003
- Parent company: Alfagomma Group (since 2005)
- Regions served: Scandinavia, Europe, North America

== See also ==
- John Boyd Dunlop
