= Dunlop Rubber =

British multinational company manufacturing natural rubber goods (1889-1985)

Dunlop Ltd.
- Formerly: List: Pneumatic Tyre and Booth's Cycle Agency Co. Ltd (1889–95); Dunlop Pneumatic Tyre (1895–1901); Dunlop Rubber Co. (1901–67); Dunlop Ltd. (1967–85)
- Industry: Automotive, sports equipment
- Founded: 18 November 1889; 137 years ago
- Founders: Harvey du Cros; John Boyd Dunlop
- Defunct: 1985; 41 years ago
- Fate: Acquired by BTR plc in 1985, becoming a brand, then operated by different companies worldwide after BTR folded, mainly by Sumitomo Rubber Industries
- Successor: BTR plc
- Headquarters: Fort Dunlop, Erdington, Birmingham, England
- Key people: Eric Geddes (Director, 1922–24)
- Products: List: Tyres; Tennis equipment (balls, rackets); Swimming equipment (swimfins, drysuits, wetsuits, weight-belt, snorkel, diving masks)
- Brands: Dunlopillo; Aquafort
- Number of employees: 102,000 (1970)
- Divisions: Dunlop Tyres; Dunlop Sport
- Subsidiaries: Slazenger (1959–85); George Angus Ltd. (1968–85)

Dunlop Ltd, formerly Dunlop Rubber, was a British multinational company, involved in the manufacture of various natural rubber goods.

The business was founded in 1889 by Harvey du Cros, and he involved John Boyd Dunlop, who had re-invented and developed the first practical pneumatic tyre for his child's tricycle. The business and original factory was founded in Upper Stephen Street, Dublin; a plaque marks the site, which is now part of the head office of the Irish multinational departments store brand, Dunnes Stores. The company was one of the first multinationals and, under du Cros and, after him, under Eric Geddes, it grew to be one of the largest British industrial companies, although J. B. Dunlop had dropped any ties to it well before his name was used for any part of the business. In 1893, its manufacturing base was relocated from Belfast and Dublin to Coventry, the centre of the British cycle industry. The company was negatively impacted by a wider economic downturn shortly after the end of the First World War, which led to a restructuring and senior management changes.

During the interwar period, the company undertook various efforts to diversify. In the late 1920s, Dunlop controlled manufacturing subsidiaries in the US, Canada, France, Germany, South Africa, Australia, India and Japan. By 1946, Dunlop had 70,000 employees, and sales outlets in nearly every country in the world. In the early 1950s, by which point the company held almost half of the UK tyre market, Dunlop developed Maxaret, the first anti-lock braking system. In 1958, Dunlop acquired domestic competitor John Bull Rubber. At its height, the company not only manufactured a wide variety of tyres but also a variety of other products, often rubber-based, including footwear, clothing, belting, sports goods and latex foam products.

Despite having recognised by the mid-1960s the potential drop in demand as the more durable radial tyres swept the market, Dunlop Rubber failed to adapt to evolving market conditions in the 1970s. In 1971, Dunlop merged with the Italian tyre manufacturer Pirelli, forming the third-largest tyre company in the world,. but this arrangement underperformed and was ultimately dissolved in 1981. In September 1983, its European tyre business was sold to its former subsidiary, Sumitomo Rubber Industries Ltd of Japan. After taking on excessive debt, Dunlop was acquired in 1985 by the industrial conglomerate BTR. Since then, ownership of the various Dunlop assets and trademarks has become fragmented, although Sumitomo Rubber Industries primarily owns the Dunlop trademark today.

== History to 1921 ==
=== Beginning ===
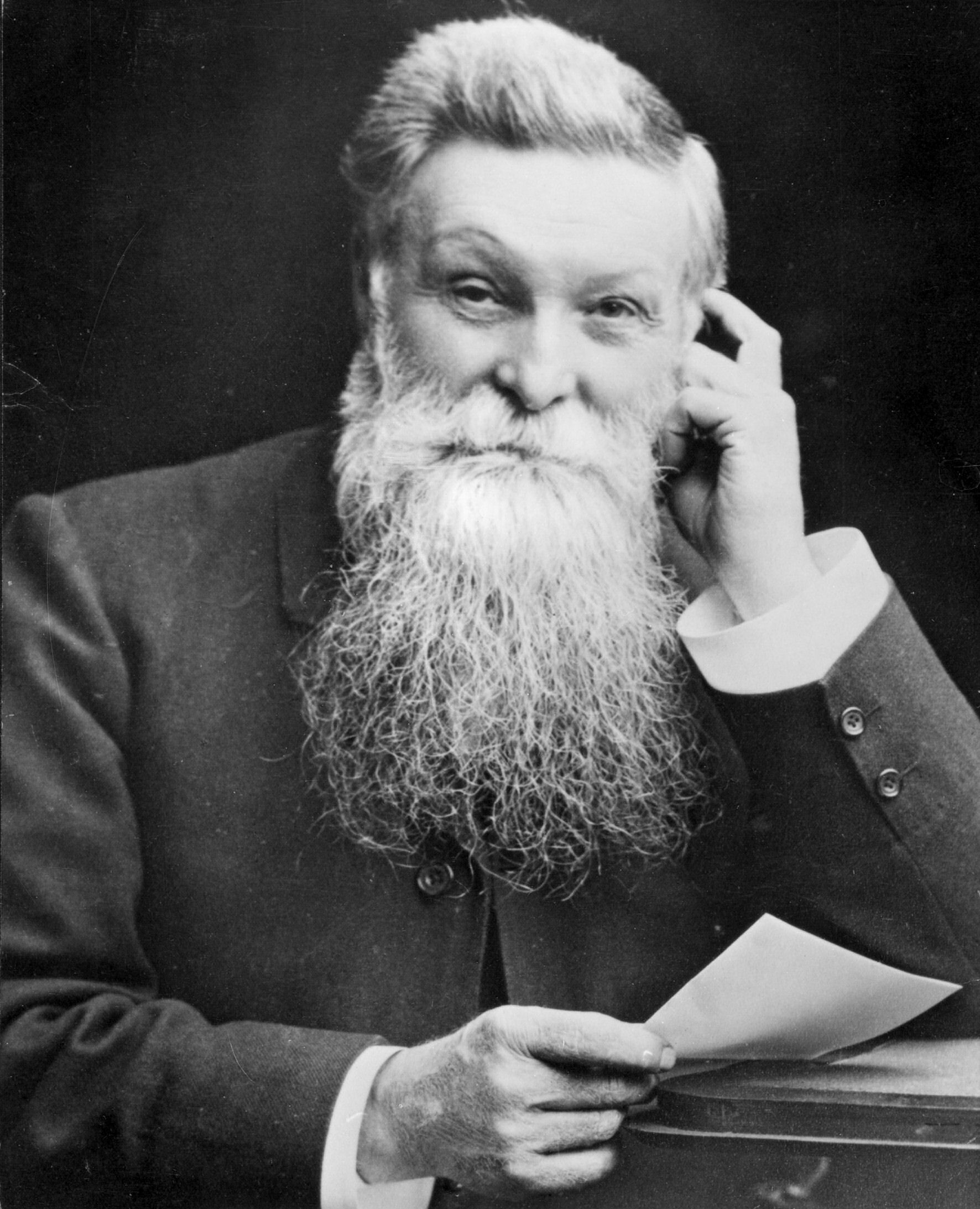
John Boyd Dunlop

In 1888, John Boyd Dunlop, a Scottish veterinary surgeon living in Ireland, discovered the pneumatic tyre principle. Willie Hume created publicity for J. B. Dunlop's discovery by winning seven out of eight cycle races with Dunlop's pneumatic tyres. To own the rights and exploit the discovery, the "Pneumatic Tyre and Booth's Cycle Agency Co. Ltd" was incorporated in 1889 and floated by Harvey du Cros, who was, amongst other things, president of the Irish Cyclists' Association. The invitation to du Cros to participate was made by William Bowden, a Dublin cycle agent. J. B. Dunlop, who could see no prosperous future in his discovery, had informally transferred his rights to Bowden. Initially J. B. Dunlop held a 20 per cent stake in the venture. The company's first headquarters was at Oriel House, Westland Row.

=== Pneumatic Tyre ===
The late 1880s was a period of great demand for John Kemp Starley's new safety bicycles. Pneumatic Tyre began cycle tyre production in Belfast in late 1890, and quickly expanded to fill consumer demand. However, in 1890, J. B. Dunlop's patent was withdrawn. It had been discovered that Robert William Thomson had first patented the pneumatic tyre in 1845. J. B. Dunlop and Harvey du Cros together worked through the ensuing considerable difficulties. They employed inventor Charles Kingston Welch and also acquired other rights and patents which allowed them to protect their business's position to some extent.

In the early 1890s, Pneumatic Tyre established divisions in Europe and North America, sending there four of du Cros's six sons. Factories were established overseas, because foreign patents rights would only be maintained if the company was engaged in active manufacture where its tyres were sold. Pneumatic Tyre partnered with local cycle firms such as Clement Cycles in France and Adler in Germany in order to limit the necessary capital expenditure. An American business was established in the US in 1893 with the first US Dunlop America Factory built in Buffalo, New York between 1920-1923, after Harvey du Cros junior was old enough (21) to sign the necessary deeds.

In 1893, its manufacturing base was relocated from Belfast and Dublin to Coventry, the centre of the British cycle industry. The Dublin Corporation had launched a case against Pneumatic Tyre, claiming nuisance from the smell of rubber and naphtha. Pneumatic Tyre soon spread developing interests in Birmingham. The following year a major interest was taken in their component supplier Byrne Bros India Rubber of Lichfield Road, Aston, Birmingham. The same year du Cros started Cycle Components Manufacturing in Selly Oak to supply inner tubes.

=== Dunlop Pneumatic Tyre ===
J. B. Dunlop resigned in 1895, and sold most of his interest in Pneumatic Tyre. In 1896, Harvey Du Cros persuaded his board to sell Pneumatic Tyre to financier Ernest Terah Hooley for £3 million. Hooley drummed up support by offering financial journalists cheap shares and appointing aristocrats to the board, and quickly sold the business again, this time as the Dunlop Pneumatic Tyre Company, for £5 million, providing a gross profit to Hooley's syndicate including du Cros of £1.7 million.

Associate and supplier Byrne Bros India Rubber, at their Manor Rubber Mills, Aston Cross, had moved from making tyre and tube components to complete inner tubes and covers. In June 1896, du Cros formed a new company, Rubber Tyre Manufacturing, to acquire Byrne Bros. E. J. Byrne was contracted to be managing director for five years.

=== Dunlop Rubber ===
From the late 1890s, Dunlop Pneumatic Tyre began to acquire its own rubber mills to process rubber, whereas previously it had assembled tyres using components from other manufacturers. In 1901, Dunlop Pneumatic Tyre used its majority holding to rename "Rubber Tyre Manufacturing" to "Dunlop Rubber". Arthur Du Cros replaced E. J. Byrne.

From 1900, Dunlop began to diversify from cycle tyres. The company manufactured its first motor car tyre in 1900. In 1906, a car wheel manufacturing plant was built. In 1910, Dunlop developed its first aeroplane tyre and golf ball.

Between 1904 and 1909, the French Dunlop subsidiary lost a total of £200,000, as European rivals such as Michelin of France and Continental of Germany overtook it in the motor tyre market. In 1909, Dunlop of France, and in 1910, Dunlop of Germany were wholly acquired by the British parent in order to enforce stronger quality control.

=== Amalgamation of Dunlop Pneumatic Tyre and Dunlop Rubber ===
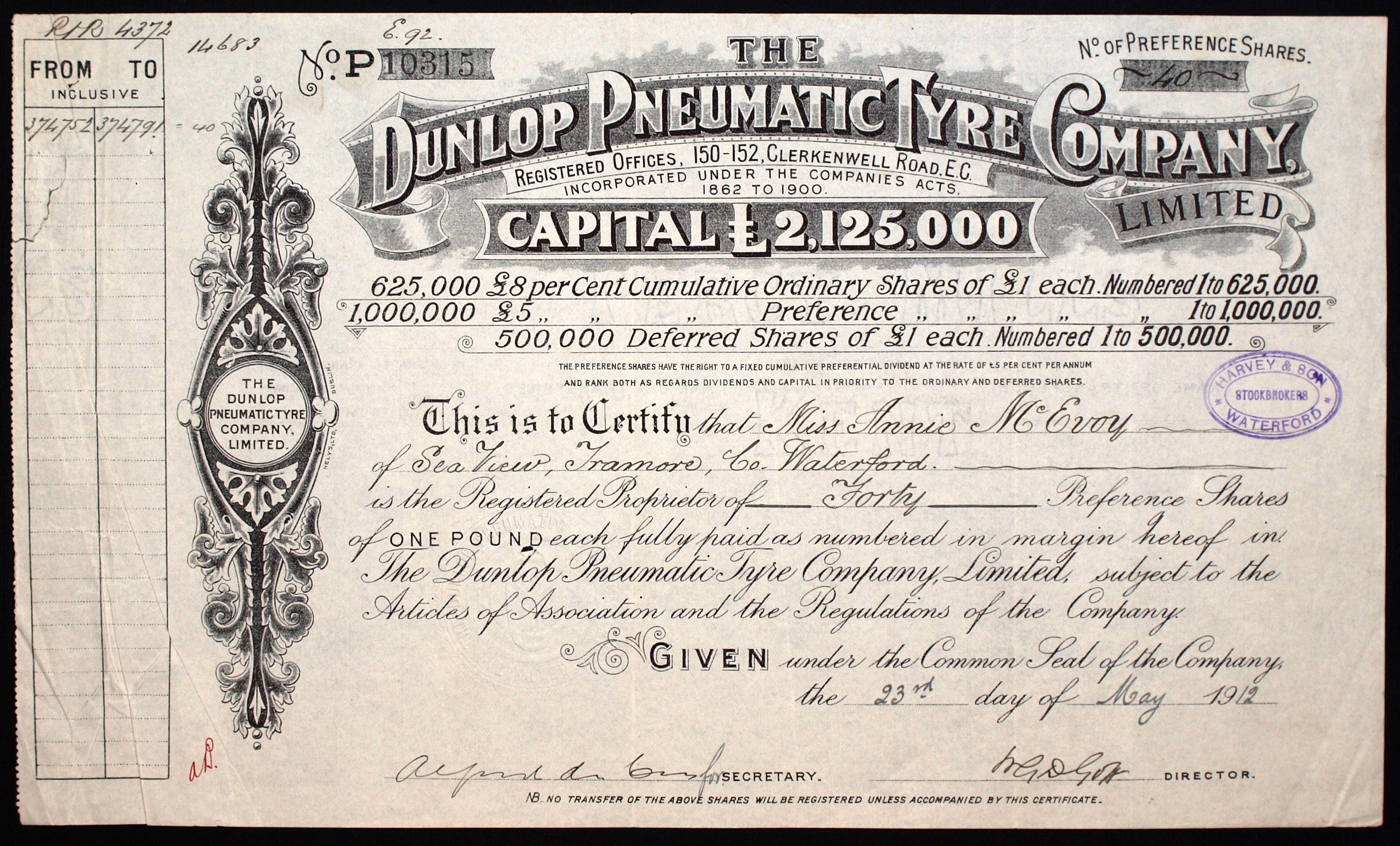
Share of the Dunlop Pneumatic Tyre Company Ltd., issued 23 May 1912

In August 1912, Dunlop Pneumatic Tyre went out of business though retaining certain financial commitments. It passed its activities to Dunlop Rubber in exchange for shares, and changed its name to The Parent Tyre Company Limited. Dunlop Rubber purchased certain of its assets including goodwill and trading rights and, in exchange, the tyre company shareholders owned three-quarters of Dunlop Rubber. The amalgamation was intended to bring about a substantial reduction in overheads and clarify what had been seen as a confusing relationship between the two enterprises when they shared most shareholders.

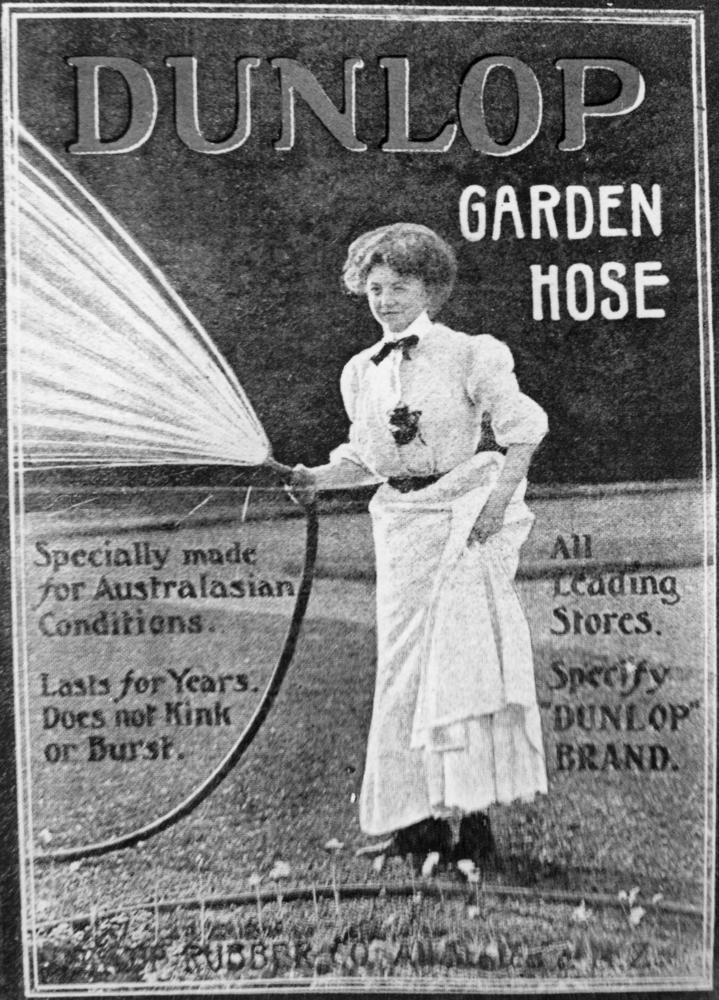
A 1914 Dunlop print advertisement for garden hoses

Arthur du Cros was made managing director and deputy chairman in 1912 and retained that position after his father's death in 1918, after which A. L. Ormrod became chairman through until 1921. For supply, Du Cros selected estates in Ceylon and Malaya for purchase and, by 1917, the company owned about 60,000 acres (24,000 hectares) acres of rubber plantations. Considerable expansion occurred during the First World War. In 1916, construction of the Fort Dunlop site began, across 400 acres (160 hectares). By 1918, Dunlop was the fourteenth-largest manufacturing company in Britain, and the only large-scale tyre manufacturer.

Arthur Du Cros had become personally close to the financier James White, and appointed him as Dunlop's financial advisor in 1913. By 1919, White had acquired control of the company. White speculated on the rubber futures market, with disastrous results, because the price of rubber collapsed. Meanwhile, there were also quality control issues affecting tyres and a wider collapse in trade shortly after the end of the First World War. That came to a head in August 1921 when the company announced a loss of £8 million on the year's trading. It was saved by the intervention of Frederick Szarvasy of the British Foreign and Colonial Corporation. White's board member nominees were removed, and Sir Eric Geddes was appointed as chairman.

== Geddes era diversification ==
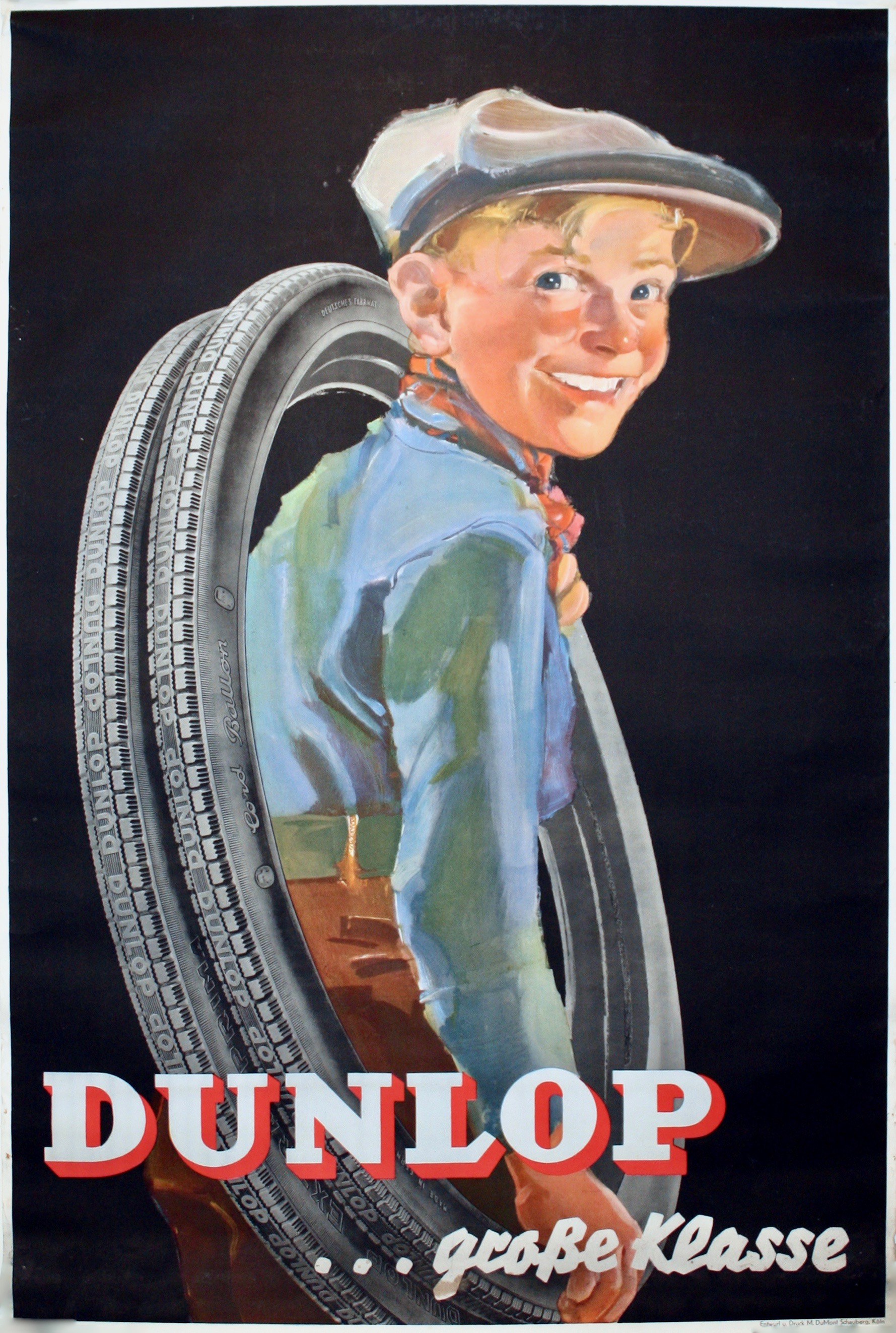
Dunlop Advertising from M. DuMont Schauberg (1925)

From 1924, Sir Eric Geddes began to diversify Dunlop. In 1924, the company began to manufacture tennis balls. In 1925, F. A. Davis was acquired, which had tennis racket manufacturing expertise. In 1926, the company acquired Charles Macintosh of Manchester for £2.5 million, and the Dunlop name was applied to footwear and clothing. Dunlop opened acquisition discussions with Slazenger in 1927, but without success. By 1928, only 72 per cent of turnover was in tyres, compared to 90 per cent in 1920.

An advertising campaign in 1928 heralded "the Dunlop way". In the late 1920s, Dunlop had manufacturing subsidiaries in the US, Canada, France, Germany, South Africa, Australia, India and Japan. By 1930, Dunlop secured an equal market share with its archrival Michelin in France.

In 1929, Dunlopillo latex foam was patented. In 1933, the commercial production of Dunlopillo products began. In 1930, Dunlop was the eighth largest public company in Britain by market value.

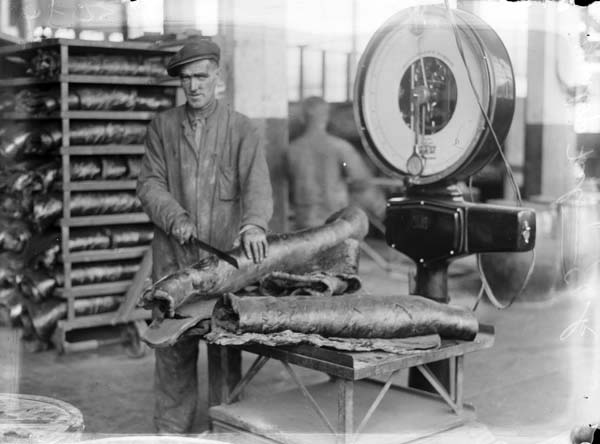
A worker at the recently opened Dunlop Factory in Cork slicing rubber for tyres (1935)

The interwar period saw considerable international expansion for Dunlop. The German subsidiary was reacquired after the First World War, and by 1929, Dunlop of Germany operated the second largest tyre factory in the country. Dunlop built manufacturing facilities in Ireland, South Africa and India during the 1930s. In 1932, the Dunlop bridge was built over the Circuit De La Sarthe, home to the Le Mans 24-hour race.

It was during the interwar period that Dunlop became firmly established as a household name. By 1939, Dunlop was one of the largest British multinational companies.

During the 1930s, Dunlop designed and licensed the production of joysticks and joystick components on British and other allied aircraft – most notably the joystick grip and head on the early Merlin engine Supermarine Spitfires that saw service during the early stages of the Second World War II. The outbreak of the war led to the company's expansion plans being paused; extensive efforts were directed into mitigating the temporary loss of natural rubber supplies and manufacturing sites that fell into Axis hands. Throughout the conflict, Dunlop was a key supplier of both tyres and rubber goods to the Allied forces.

== Post war ==
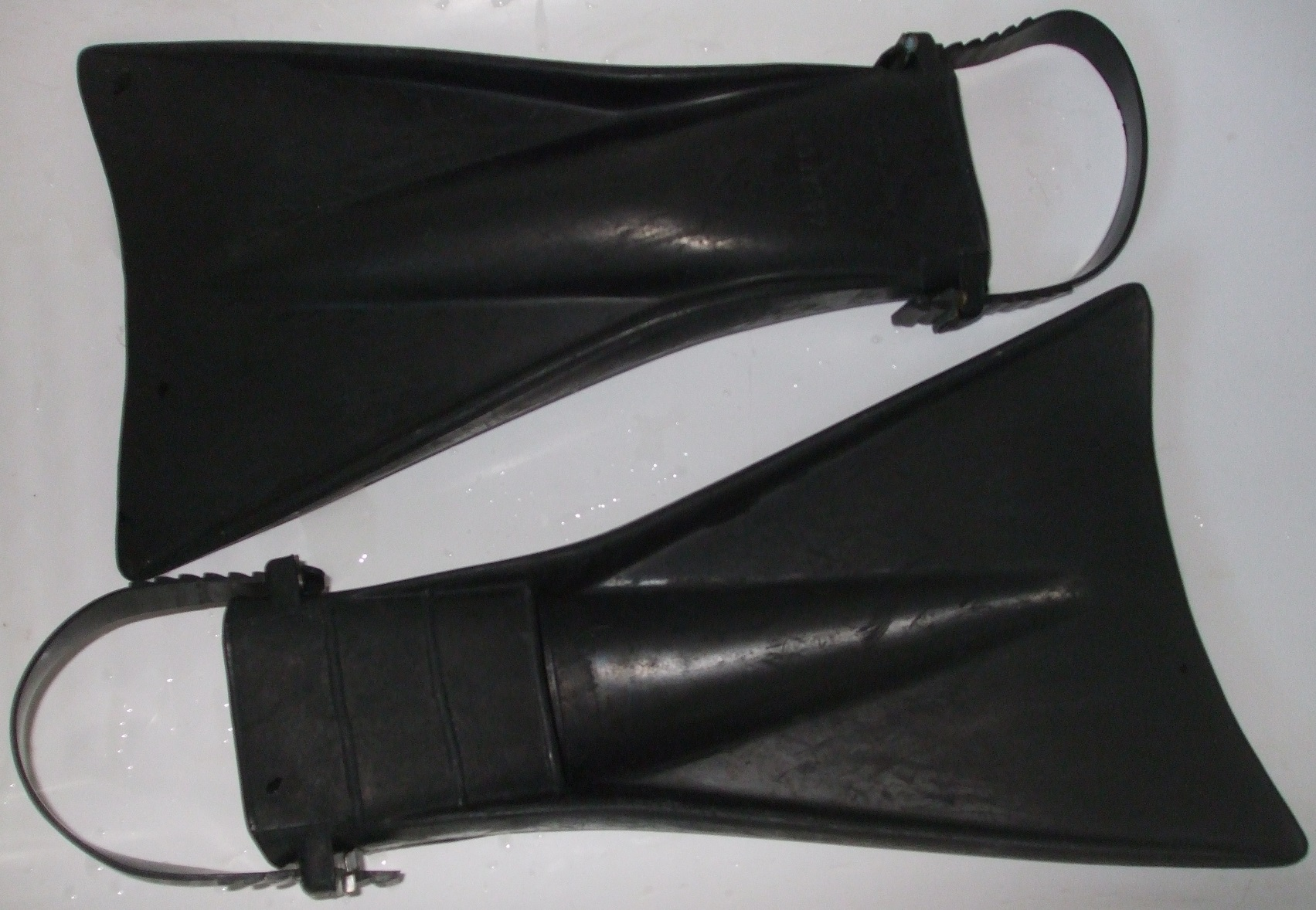
Dunlop Aquafort swim fins made from mid-1950s to early 1960s

By 1946, Dunlop had 70,000 employees, and sales outlets in nearly every country in the world. The firm resumed its expansion immediately after the end of the war, increasing production across its existing plants in the UK, Canada, and the US. In 1948, Dunlop invented the self-sealing tyre, which reduced the risk from blowouts. In the early 1950s, Dunlop developed Maxaret, the first anti-lock braking system. By 1955, Dunlop had almost half of the UK tyre market.

In 1955, a report produced by the Monopolies and Restrictive Practices Commission found that Dunlop and the four other main sellers in the UK market (Goodyear, Avon, Firestone and Michelin) companies had arrangements which resulted in fixed prices. These arrangements were forced to change, and Dunlop's market share decreased. In July 1956, the Monopolies and Restrictive Practices Commission published a further document with implications for Dunlop products entitled Report on the Supply of Certain Rubber Footwear, which covered not only rubber boots of all kinds including wellingtons and overboots but also rubber-soled sports shoes with canvas uppers.

In 1952, a group of British military veterans raided Dunlop's annual shareholder meeting to protest against British colonialism and the Malayan Emergency. This protest, which took place in the aftermath of the British Malayan headhunting scandal, saw the soldiers throwing leaflets across the room containing both anti-colonial messages and photographs of British troops posing with the severed heads of suspected communist and anti-colonial guerrillas.

In 1958, Dunlop acquired British rival John Bull Rubber, which also included Metalastic. Throughout the 1950s, Dunlop had manufacturing plants in Brazil and New Zealand.

The Dunlop Aquafort range of underwater swimming equipment, including one- and two-piece dry suits, wetsuits, weight-belt, snorkel, diving mask and swimming fins was manufactured between 1956 and 1962 or so by Dunlop Special Products Limited at Fort Dunlop in Birmingham and distributed by Dunlop Sports Company Limited at Allington House, 136–142 Victoria Street, London.

A further factor in Dunlop's decline was the decision during the early 1960s to develop cheaper textile radial tyres rather than the more durable steel-belted radial tyres. Dunlop lost market share to manufacturers marketing steel-belted tyres, such as Michelin. Meanwhile, UK productivity and quality was poor. Salesmen preferred products from the company's continental factories.

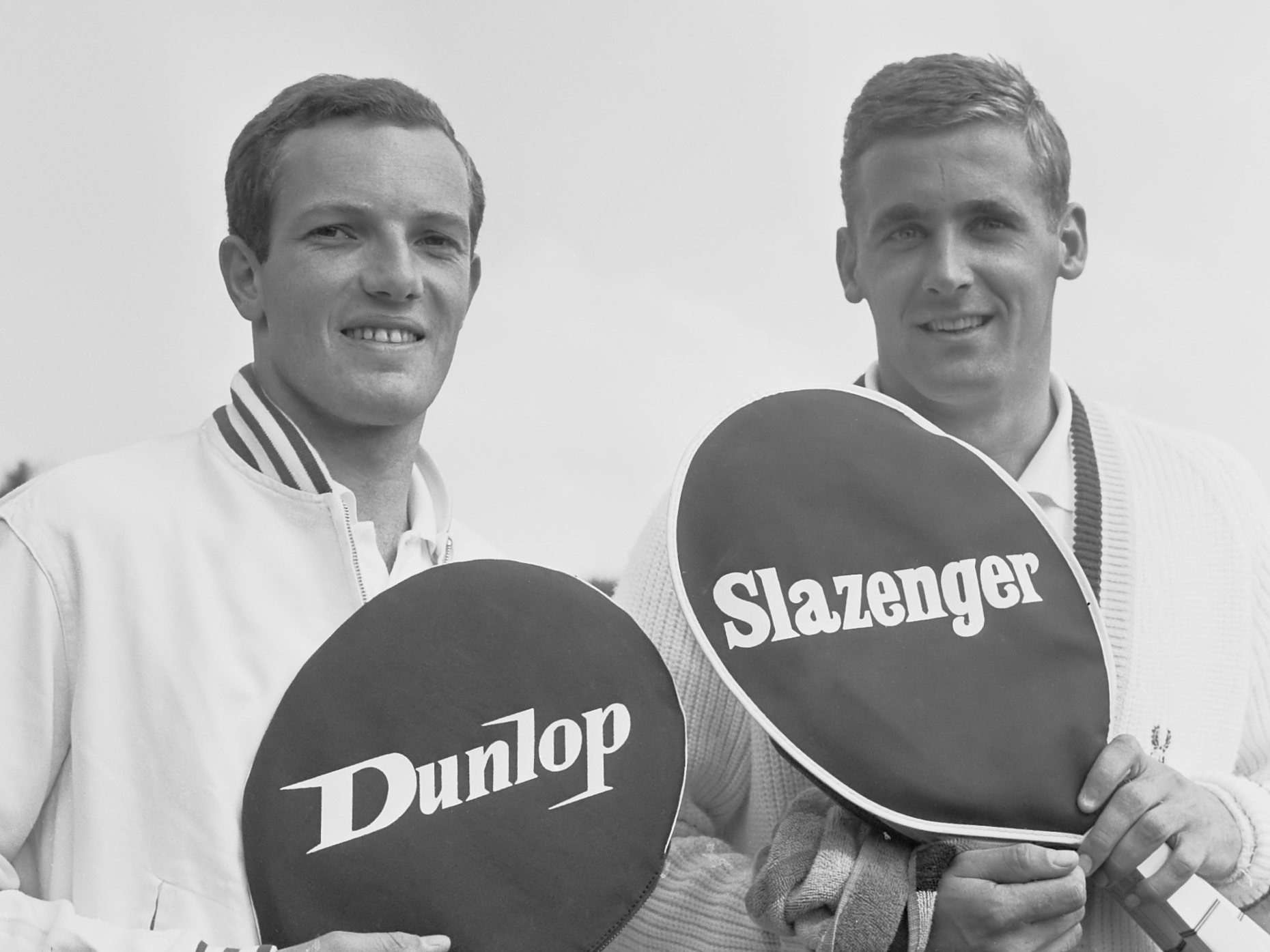
Dutch tennis players Tom Okker and Jan Hajer pose with Dunlop and Slazenger rackets in 1964

In 1967, the company changed its name from the "Dunlop Rubber Company Ltd" to "Dunlop Ltd" to reflect its diversification from rubber. At this time, around 60 per cent of sales came from overseas, and tyres represented 60 per cent of company turnover.

Sir Reay Geddes, the son of Sir Eric Geddes, became chairman of Dunlop in 1968.

In 1968, Dunlop acquired George Angus Ltd of Newcastle upon Tyne, a world leader in the supply of fire hoses and fire fighting equipment. That year Dunlop recorded operating profits of £31.8 million along with net profits of £11.2 million. By the late 1960s, Dunlop was the 35th largest company in the world outside the United States. In 1970, Dunlop had 102,000 employees.

In 1971, Dunlop merged with the Italian tyre manufacturer Pirelli to form the world's third-largest tyre company after Goodyear and Firestone. The merger was a joint venture arrangement where each company took minority interests in the other's subsidiaries, rather than a takeover. The merger was not successful, and the joint venture was dissolved in 1981. Pirelli was not profitable throughout the entire duration of the merger.

The decline of the British car manufacturing industry from 1972 onwards also impacted the core Dunlop business. Matters were further compounded by the 1973 oil crisis.

== Takeover and breakup ==
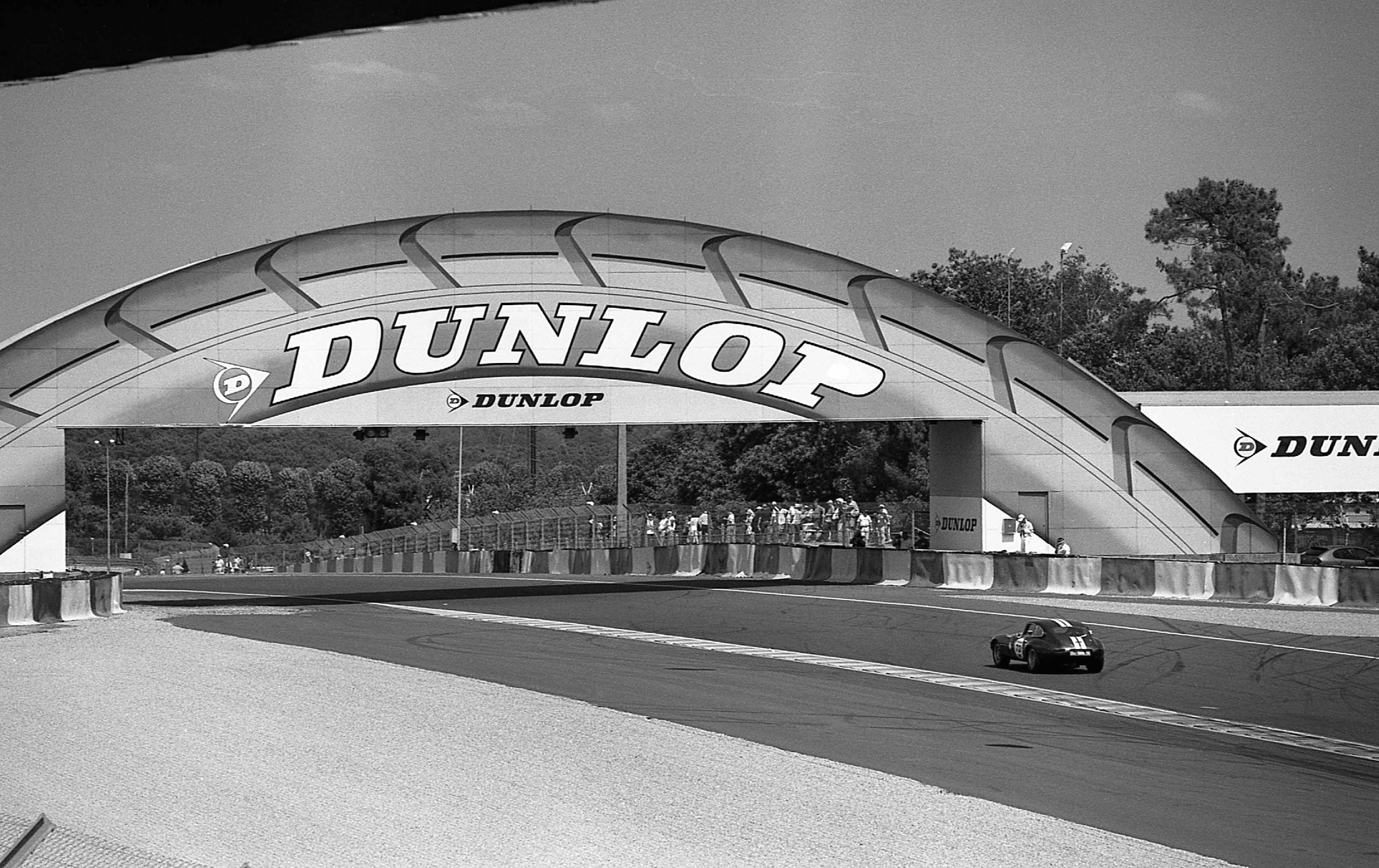
A classic historic racing Jaguar E-Type hustles over the top of the Dunlop Curve towards the Dunlop Bridge at Circuit de la Sarthe, Le Mans. Originally built in 1932 as an advertising footbridge at the entry to the curve, the iconic bridge was moved in 1965 to its present location at the top of the Dunlop Curve, and the entry to the short straight to the Dunlop Chicane.

As a result of increasing competition in the tyre industry, and the disastrous results of the Pirelli tie-up, Dunlop had amassed massive debts. Sir Reay Geddes stepped down as chairman in 1978 and Sir Campbell Fraser took over. Between 1978 and 1981, Dunlop spent US$102 million on modernising its European tyre business. The British workforce was cut from 13,000 to 7,000. Angus and the company rubber plantations were sold. By July 1983, the Malaysian businessman Ghafar Baba had built a 26.1 per cent stake in the company.

In September 1983, the European tyre business was sold to its former subsidiary, Sumitomo Rubber Industries Ltd of Japan, for £82 million. In 1984, the remaining tyre factories in New Zealand and India were sold for £200 million. In 1985, the company was acquired by BTR plc for £100 million; BTR immediately sold the US tyre business to its management for £142 million.

BTR began to divest itself of the Dunlop businesses from 1996 in order to transform itself from a conglomerate into a streamlined engineering company. In 1996, it sold Dunlop Slazenger to its management, backed by private equity group CINVen for £372 million; in 2004, they sold the business to Sports Direct International for £40 million.

In 1996, Dunlop Aircraft Tyres Ltd of Birmingham was sold to a group of investors backed by 3i for £10 million.

In 1998, BTR sold BTR Aerospace Group, which included Dunlop Aviation and Dunlop Precision Rubber, to Doughty Hanson & Co for £510 million to form Dunlop Standard. In 2004, Dunlop Standard was sold to Meggitt in exchange for £800 million. Meggitt has inherited the original English company, now named Dunlop Holdings Ltd, incorporated in 1896.

In 1998, BTR sold its share of the South African subsidiary, Dunlop Africa Ltd, which was itself divided in 2001. The industrial products division was sold to become Dunlop Industrial Products and Dunlop Rubber Mouldings. The tyre business, Dunlop Tyres International, was bought by Apollo Tyres of India in 2006. Apollo Tyres were never comfortable with, nor fully committed to the Dunlop Brand and sold most of the company, including all of the Dunlop Tyre trademark rights in Africa, to Sumitomo Rubber Industries in 2013. Dunlop Tyres International had owned the rights to various Dunlop brands in a number of countries outside South Africa, and these rights were sold to Sports Direct in 2006.

== Dunlop Tyres since 1985 ==
Sumitomo Rubber Industries sold tyres for road vehicles with the Dunlop brand from 1985 to 1999. In 1999, Sumitomo RI and Goodyear Tire and Rubber Company of the US formed a joint venture. Goodyear obtained the Dunlop tyre assets in Europe and the US, and Sumitomo RI continued to sell Dunlop tyres in other countries. In 2015, Goodyear took full ownership of Goodyear Dunlop Europe by acquiring Sumitomo's 25 percent stake in the company. In 2025, Sumitomo purchased the rights to the Dunlop brand in both North America and Europe from Goodyear.

In January 2007, the Dunlop Tyres company in South Africa was acquired by the Indian company Apollo Tyres in exchange for $62 million. In December 2013, Apollo Tyres sold most of its South African operations to Sumitomo RI for $60 million (Rs 3.33 billion), including the Ladysmith passenger car tyre plant. Apollo Tyres retained its Durban plant, which manufactured truck & bus radial (TBR) tyres and off-highway tyres used in the mining and construction industries (The Durban plant however closed in 2014 after management failed to maintain profitability). Sumitomo RI had also previously acquired ownership rights for the Dunlop brand in 32 African markets. In 2018, Sumitomo RI started manufacturing truck & bus radial (TBR) tyres at the Ladysmith plant. Much of this TBR equipment was acquired from the closed Apollo Tyres Durban plant. Sumitomo RI invested heavily in the Ladysmith plant; by 2018, the plant was almost double the size since they acquired the company in 2013.

== See also ==
- Dunlop (brands)
