= A1 registration plate =

Historic UK vehicle registration plate

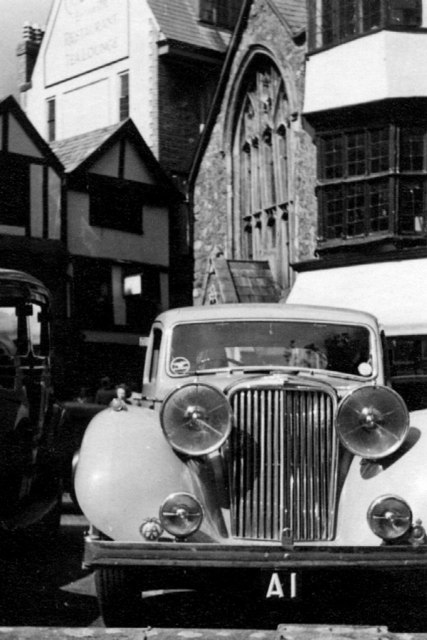
A Jaguar Mark IV car, registered under A 1, parked in Cathedral Close, Exeter in front of St Martin's Church, May 1948

A 1 is a United Kingdom vehicle registration plate first issued in London in 1903. Although often incorrectly believed to be the first number plate issued in the UK, it was in fact only the first issued in London. The plate has had several owners over the years and has been transferred between numerous vehicles.

== History ==
In 1903, the Motor Car Act, which mandated the registration of motor vehicles, became law. It took effect on 1 January 1904, though the first number plates were issued in late 1903. The A 1 registration plate was issued by London County Council in December 1903. From surviving records, the first number known to have been issued is DY 1, issued in Hastings on 23 November 1903.

The plate was issued to the second Earl Russell for his Napier car. There are different accounts of how Russell obtained the plate, with many stating he queued all night for it, or he made his butler queue all night. However Russell served in the London County Council as an Alderman from 1895 to 1904, and was at one time chairman of the council highways committee. All the first London registrations with single-digit numbers went to politicians connected with the London County Council or their relatives. (Note: Registration A 2 was obtained by David Waterlow (London county councillor); A 3 went to Joseph Allen Baker, chair of the LCC highways committee. A 4 was allocated to Mark Mayhew (London county councillor); A 5 - Sir William Bell (alderman of LCC); A 6 - John Dickson-Poynder (London county councillor);A 7 - Willoughby Dickinson (chairman of LCC). A 8 and A 9 were given to George Baker and Philip Barton Baker, brothers of Joseph Allen Baker.)

In 1906, Russell's car, with the registration, was sold to the Chairman of the London County Council. In 1907, it was bought by George Pettyt for £30. He was the head of the Maudes Group, a car dealership. (Note: In 1923, Pettyt established the Maudes Trophy, a motorcycle endurance competition that is still held.) Pettyt successively transferred the registration to each of his personal cars over the following years.

Pettyt died in 1950. His Sunbeam Talbot 90, which then bore the plate, was bequeathed to Trevor Laker, a former editor of Motorcycle and Cycle Trader, and a company director of John Bull Rubber. In 1951, Talbot transferred the registration from the Sunbeam-Talbot to a new Austin A90 Atlantic, which became the 37th car to use the plate. A condition of Prettyt's bequest was that Laker would use the plate for his lifetime, then it was to be sold and the proceeds given to a dogs' charity. In 1959, Laker sold the plate for £2,500 and donated the money to The Guide Dogs for the Blind Association, with Laker allowed to continue using it for his lifetime. In 1970 Laker died, and the buyer–Dunlop Rubber–took ownership and rights to the plate.

Dunlop put the registration onto a Daimler limousine that was used to transport VIPs to and from the Dunlop factories. The plate was used for a brief period on the Director of Engineering's car, a Mini. The tyre division later took ownership and it was used for promotional purposes, including the marketing of the Denovo "fail-safe" wheels. The Director of the Coventry-based Dunlop factory also used A 1 on his company car, which was an Austin Princess, which he and the car relocated to Head Office in London.

In 1985, BTR plc gained the A 1 plate after it acquired Dunlop. The company's headquarters in Birmingham placed it on a Ford Granada. In the 90s, the plate was bought by Jefri Bolkiah, after its sale by Insignia Registrations alongside the plate 1 A. The plates were placed on matching white Bentley Azures.

The plate was assigned to a black 2007 Mini Cooper S Auto from 17 May 2007, 3 days from when the car was first registered, until 25 September 2024.

As of January 2026, the registration plate is currently on retention.

== See also ==
- Vanity plate
- Vehicle registration plates of the United Kingdom
