= BTR Aerospace Group =

UK company

Logo of the Dunlop Aircraft Tyres division, acquired by BTR in 1985

BTR Aerospace Group was a group of four companies formed in 1985 by BTR plc after the acquisition of the Dunlop Aviation Division from Dunlop Rubber. It comprised Dunlop Aviation Division, Aero Engine Equipment, Dunlop Precision Rubber, and Standard Aero (Canada).

In 1996, Dunlop Aircraft Tyres Limited was sold by BTR plc to form an independent company. It is based at Fort Dunlop, Birmingham, England.

In July 1998, Doughty Hanson & Co purchased BTR Aerospace Group and renamed it Dunlop Standard Aerospace Group.
