= Stephen Young (businessman) =

British businessman (born 1955)

- Born: Stephen Gareth Young; May 1955 (age 70)
- Occupation: businessman
- Title: CEO, Meggitt
- Term: May 2013-January 2018
- Predecessor: Terry Twigger
- Successor: Tony Wood

Stephen Gareth Young (born May 1955) is a British businessman. He was the chief executive (CEO) of Meggitt plc, a British engineering business specialising in aerospace equipment, from May 2013 to January 2018.

== Early life ==
Young is a chartered management accountant.

== Career ==
Young was finance director of Meggitt from 2004 to 2013, and became CEO in May 2013. In January 2018, he retired and was succeeded by Tony Wood.

Young is a non-executive director of Derwent London.
