= Marco Caribotti =

Professional motocross rider

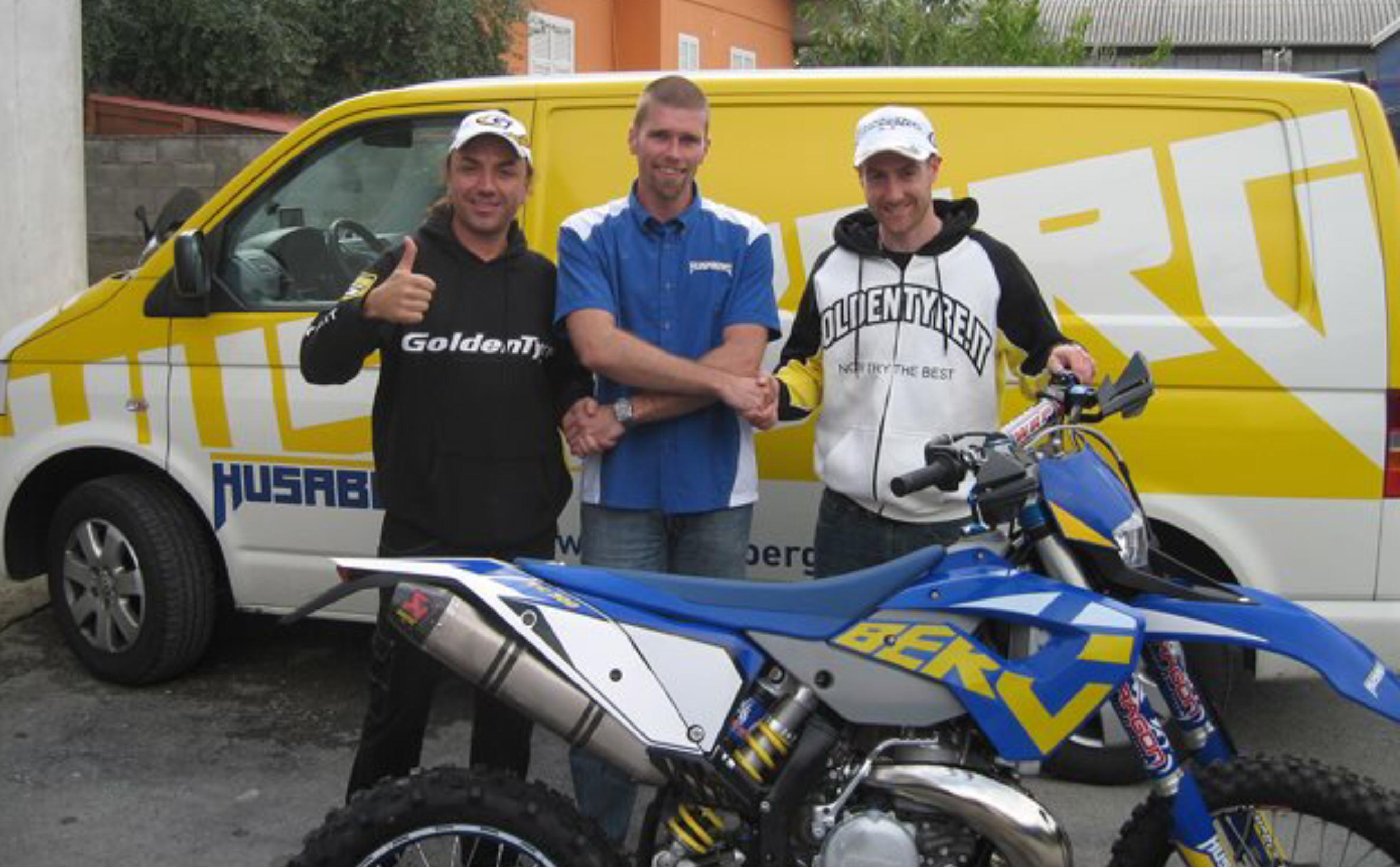
- Born: Marco Abdul Kareem Caribotti; 22 August 1969 (age 57); Massa, Tuscany, Italy
- Nationality: Italian/German
- Bike number: 969
Statistics
Motocross Championships
Active years	1988 - 1998
Enduro Championships
Active years	1998 - 2014
Last win	2014 KRKA Rally Croatia
Supermoto Championships
Active years	2001 - 2003

Marco Abdul Kareem Caribotti (born August 22, 1969), known as Karibo, is an Italian professional motocross rider. He has a career spanning over three decades. He won the International Krka Rally in Croatia in 2014.

Caribotti is known for competing in Enduro World Championship, World MX Championship and the Enduro World Championship. Notably, he rode for renowned teams such as Kawasaki Italy, Kawasaki Racing, Praga Moto, Husaberg Factory, and Sherco Motorcycle.

== Career ==
Caribotti's served as a test rider for Dunlop Tires, Praga Motorcycle, Husaberg Motorcycle, Sherco Motorcycle, SACHS Suspensions, and Goldentyre tires.

Following his competitive riding career, his notable expeditions included traversing Ras Al Khaimah desert on a BMW GS 1250 and scaling Jebel Jais on a Honda Africa Twin.

In 2006, Caribotti founded Team Flite, his own motorcycle racing team. Through this venture, he discovered Graham Jarvis, who went on to achieve success as an Enduro Extreme Rider and world champion.

In 2015, Caribotti took a leap into entrepreneurship by purchasing Goldentyre, a tires manufacturing company.
