= Twigger =

Twigger is a surname. Notable people with the surname include:

- Robert Twigger (born 1962), British author
- Steve Twigger, English musician
- Terry Twigger (born 1949), British businessman
