= Aircraft tire =

Tires manufactured for use in aircraft

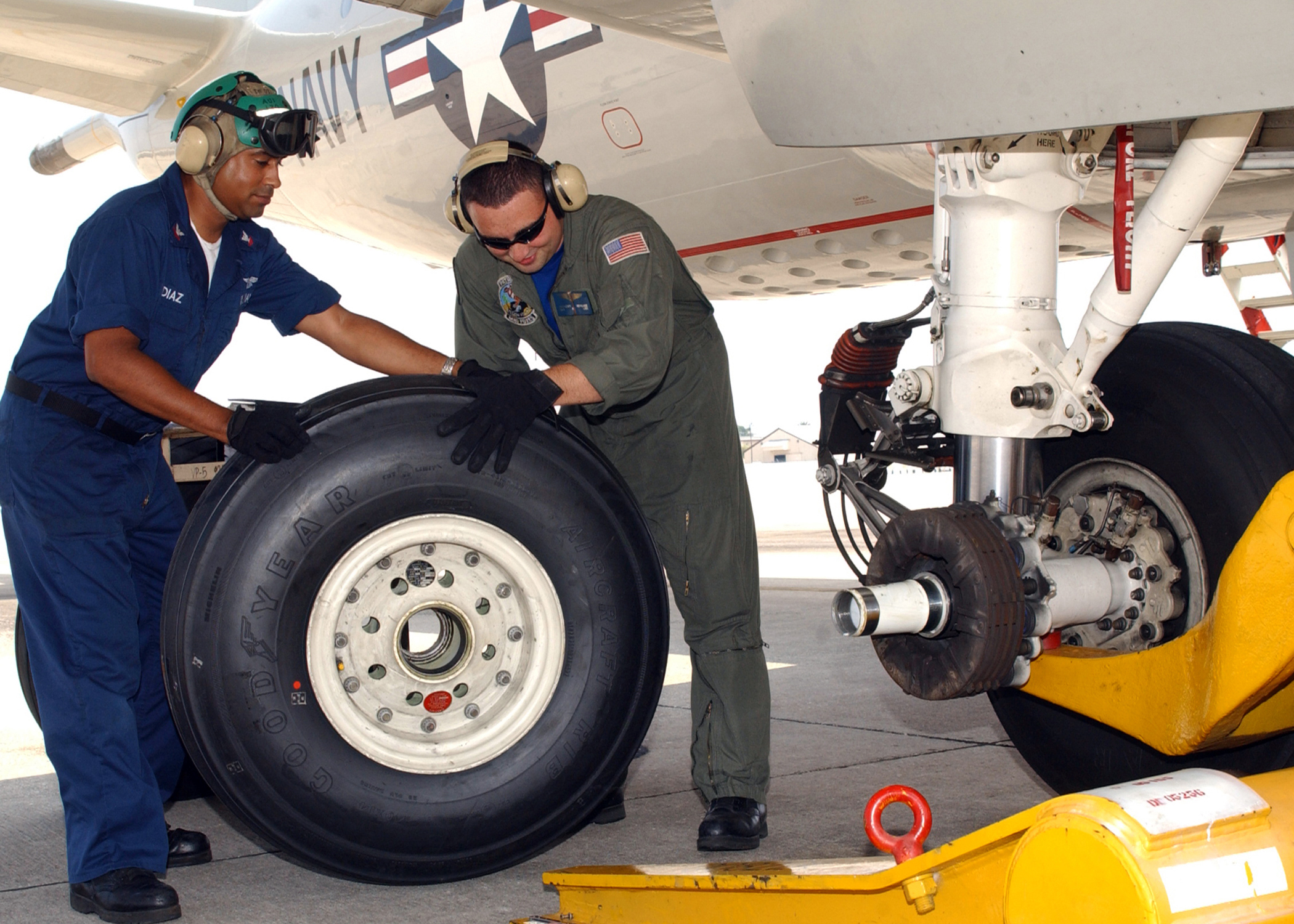
Changing a wheel on a Lockheed P-3 Orion aircraft

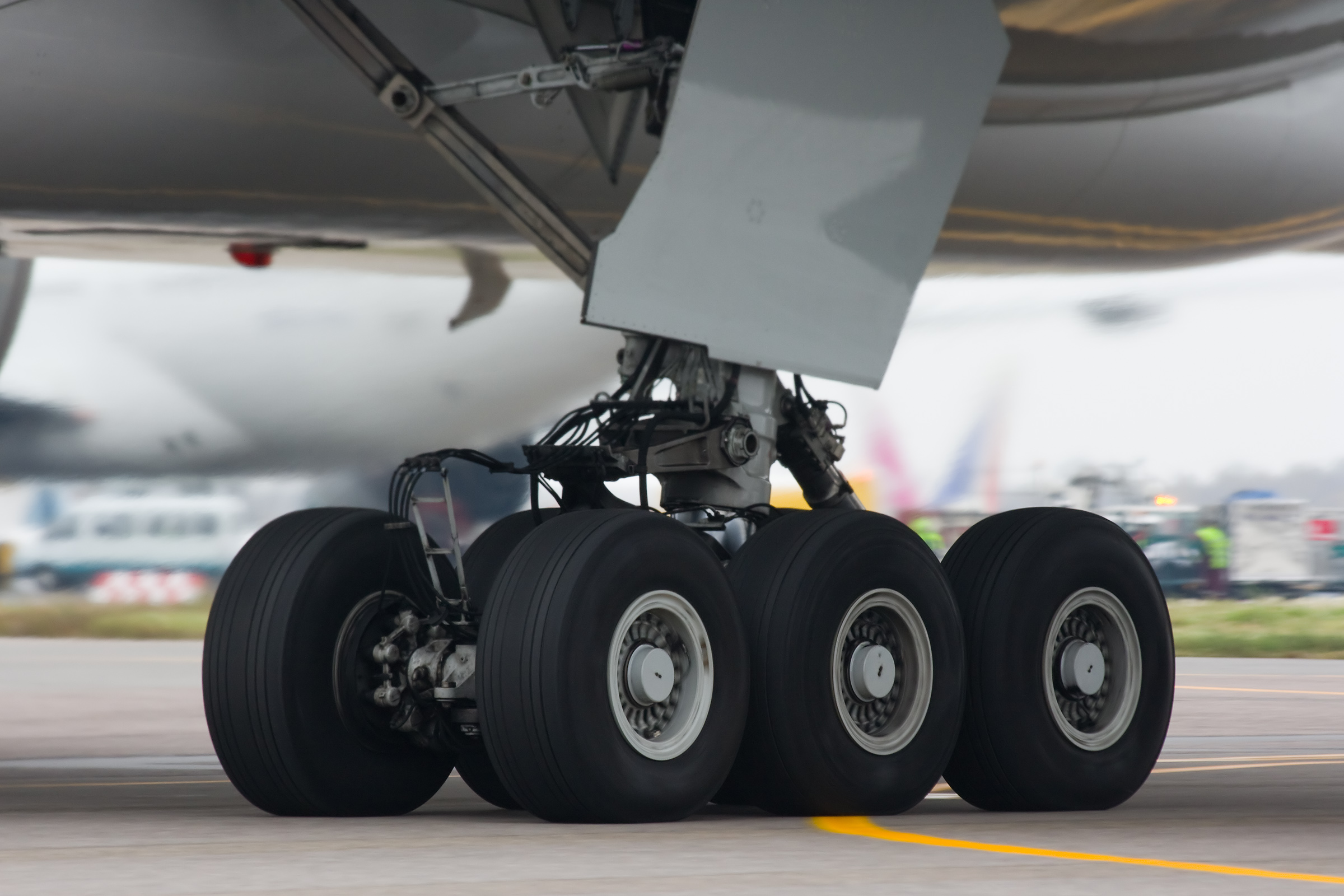
Tires on the wheels of a bogie on a Boeing 777

An aircraft tire or tyre is designed to withstand extremely heavy loads for short durations. The number of tires required for aircraft increases with the weight of the aircraft, as the weight of the airplane needs to be distributed more evenly. Aircraft tire tread patterns are designed to facilitate stability in high crosswind conditions, to channel water away to prevent hydroplaning, and for braking effect.

Aircraft tires also include fusible plugs (which are assembled on the inside of the wheels), designed to melt at a certain temperature. Tires often overheat if maximum braking is applied during an aborted takeoff or an emergency landing. The fuses provide a safer failure mode that prevents tire explosions by deflating in a controlled manner, thus minimizing damage to aircraft and objects in the surrounding environment.

== Inflation ==
Aircraft tires generally operate at high pressures, up to 200 psi (14 bar; 1,400 kPa) for airliners, and even higher for business jets. The main landing gear on the Concorde was typically inflated to 232 psi (16.0 bar), whilst its tail bumper gear tires were as high as 294 psi (20.3 bar). The high pressure and weight load on the Concorde tyres were a significant factor in the loss of Air France Flight 4590.

Tests of airliner aircraft tires have shown that they are able to sustain pressures of maximum 800 psi (55 bar; 5,500 kPa) before bursting. During the tests the tires have to be filled with water, to prevent the test room being blown apart by the energy that would be released by a gas when the tire bursts.

Aircraft tires are usually inflated with dry nitrogen to minimize expansion and contraction from extreme changes in ambient temperature and pressure experienced during flight. Dry nitrogen expands at the same rate as other dry atmospheric gases (normal air is about 80% nitrogen), but common compressed air sources may contain moisture, which increases the expansion rate with temperature.

The requirement that an inert gas, such as nitrogen, be used instead of air for inflation of tires on certain transport category airplanes was prompted by at least three cases in which the oxygen in air-filled tires had combined with volatile gases given off by a severely overheated tire and exploded upon reaching autoignition temperature. The use of an inert gas for tire inflation eliminates the possibility of tire explosion.

== Manufacturers ==
The aircraft tire manufacturing industry is dominated by a four firm oligopoly that controls approximately 85% of global market share.

The four major manufacturers in aircraft tire manufacturing are the following according to a report by Pelmar Engineering in 2013:

- Goodyear (United States)
- Michelin (France)
- Dunlop Aircraft Tyres (United Kingdom)
- Bridgestone (Japan)

As of the mid-2020s, this quartet continues to dominate the global OEM (original equipment manufacturer) aircraft tire segment, with combined market share remaining in the range of 80–85%. Michelin has emerged as the market leader due to exclusive contracts and advanced radial tire technology, while Goodyear and Bridgestone continue to maintain major supply roles.

Dunlop (DATL) remains the smallest among the four but has pursued regional by establishing a facility in China in partnership with Swire. DATL fully acquired the China subsidiary in 2023 by buying the 37% stake from its joint venture partner.

Kumho Tire also produces aircraft tyres for Asiana Airlines as well as other major airline manufacturers and is the only South Korean manufacturer to do so. There are several other smaller industry players, particularly in China. Among these producers are Guilin-based Guilin Lanyu Aircraft Tire Development Co., a subsidiary of ChemChina that was founded in 1980; a Yinchuan, Ningxia located aircraft tire plant owned by Singapore-based Giti Tire; and Qingdao, Shandong-based Sentury Tire, which manufactures tires for the Boeing 737.

== See also ==
- Tundra tire
