= Dunlop Aircraft Tyres =

British aircraft tyre manufacturer

Dunlop Aircraft Tyres Limited
- Company type: Private
- Industry: Manufacturing
- Founded: 1910
- Founder: John Boyd Dunlop
- Headquarters: Birmingham, England, United Kingdom
- Key people: Mick Wallwork (CEO)
- Products: Aircraft tyres
- Services: Retread
- Owner: Liberty Hall Capital Partners
- Number of employees: 400
- Website: www.dunlopaircrafttyres.co.uk

Dunlop Aircraft Tyres Limited is a company based in Birmingham, England, that designs, manufactures and retreads aircraft tyres.

== History ==
Dunlop Aircraft Tyres was established in 1910 as part of Dunlop Ltd. (formally Dunlop Rubber), which itself had been founded by pneumatic tyre pioneer John Boyd Dunlop in Belfast, Ireland, in 1888.

It was Dunlop Ltd., the original company, who designed the brakes for Concorde and had also invented Maxaret, the world's first anti-lock braking system (ABS), in the early 1950s which improved stopping distances for aircraft.

In 1996, following the breakup of Dunlop Ltd., it became an independent company.

In July 2011 DATL was awarded a The Queen's Award for Enterprise: International Trade (Export), for six years of export growth.

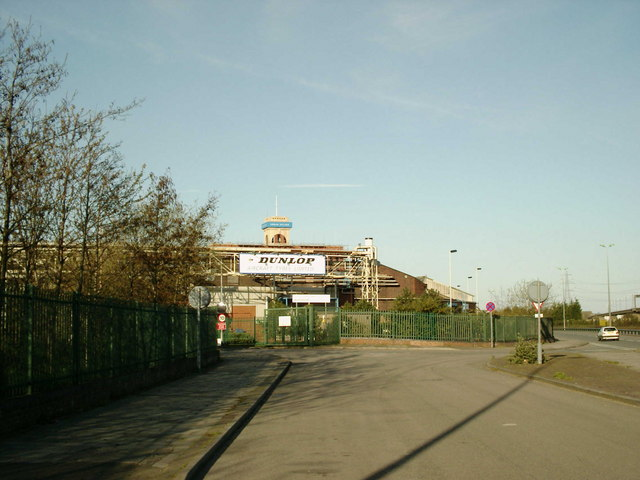
Entrance to the site

== Structure ==
Dunlop Aircraft Tyres is headquartered in the Erdington district of Birmingham, UK on what used to be part of the original Dunlop factory established in 1917. It is situated next to the Fort Dunlop building, between the M6 and A38.

The company also has after-market service and retreading facilities in Jinjian, China and in North Carolina, US.

== Products ==
It can supply tyres for over 300 different types of aircraft in the civil and military markets. 80% of its products are exported.

== See also ==
- Aerospace industry in the United Kingdom
- Dunlop (brands)
- List of aircraft tire companies
