= Sentury Tire =

Chinese tire manufacturer

Qingdao Sentury Tire Co., Ltd.
- Traded as: Shenzhen Stock Exchange
- ISIN: 002984
- Founded: 1992; 34 years ago
- Headquarters: No.5 Tian Shan San Road, Jimo, Qingdao, Shandong, China
- Products: Car and aviation tires
- Website: senturytireusa.com

Sentury Tire (formerly the Sentaida Group) is a Chinese manufacturer of tires for cars and aviation, listed on the Shenzhen Stock Exchange. In 2015, it was ranked the 50th largest tire maker in the world by sales according to the trade publication "Tire Business". The company markets tires under the Landsail and Delinte brands.

== Manufacturing ==
The company's original main manufacturing site is located in its hometown of Qingdao near the Qingdao Liuting International Airport. The company claims the factory opened in 2009 and that it is one of the most automated tire factories in the world. Its other manufacturing facility is in Thailand where it opened a factory in 2015, with a capacity to produce 12 million units per year.

In 2016 Sentury Tire announced plans to open a facility in LaGrange, GA initially adding 1,000 jobs. It planned to establish its American headquarters, research and development, distribution and manufacturing center with a capacity of 10 million tires per year. In September 2016 it was announced that they had found a location for the factory and had hired Rami Helminen, an executive formerly with Nokian Tyres to oversee the project.

In July 2019, it was announced that the project was on "indefinite hold" due to "the uncertainty with the trade relations between the U.S. and China" resulting in difficulties in their initial public offering. At that time, they closed their LaGrange offices, and Rami Helminen left the company.

== Products ==
Sentury mainly produces passenger car tires. In 2013 it became a new entrant in aviation tires, a specialized industry dominated by an oligopoly. Its product line in aviation includes the main landing gear tire for the Boeing 737-700/800/900 aircraft certified under Federal Aviation Administration technical standard TSOC62e-2006.
