= Frederick Szarvasy =

Frederick Alexander Szarvasy (20 February 1875 – 3 July 1948) was a Hungarian-born British financier. He became one of the leading financiers and industrialists in Britain.

== Life ==
Frederick Szarvasy was born in Hungary, then a part of the Austro-Hungarian Empire. He was the son of Alexander Szarvasy, a banker. After spending some time in South America, he arrived in London around 1901 and worked for Montagu Oppenheimer.

Szarvasy quickly rose to prominence and gained a reputation for salvaging companies that were undermined by excessive debt. When Dunlop Rubber faced bankruptcy in 1921, Szarvasy was appointed as chairman and managing director.

Szarvasy was described by an American trade magazine as "the most daring and successful financier in London" in 1923.

Szarvasy played a leading role in the foundation of Imperial Airways in 1924.

Szarvasy acquired United Anthracite Collieries from Lord Melchett in 1928. As such, he gained control of 80 percent of the South Wales anthracite supply.

Szarvasy died suddenly at his London home on 3 July 1948.
