= Tony Wood (British businessman) =

- Born: Antony Wood; April 1966 (age 60)
- Education: Open University; INSEAD
- Title: CEO, Meggitt PLC
- Term: January 2018-
- Predecessor: Stephen Young

Antony Wood FRAeS (born April 1966) is a British businessman, and the CEO of Meggitt PLC since January 2018, when he succeeded Stephen Young, having previously been chief operating officer (COO).

== Early life ==
Wood earned a bachelor's degree in engineering from the Open University, and an MBA from INSEAD.

== Career ==
Wood spent 16 years working for the French company Messier-Dowty, now part of the Safran Group.

From May 2013 to January 2016, Wood was president of the aerospace division of Rolls-Royce Holdings. According to the Evening Standard, Wood's departure from Rolls-Royce following a restructuring "seemed an abrupt end to a high-flying career", but with his appointment as COO of Meggitt PLC, "it appears he was only biding his time".

From 2016, Wood was COO of Meggitt, and succeeded Stephen Young as CEO in January 2018.

Wood is a Fellow of the Royal Aeronautical Society, and a Fellow of the Association of Project Management.
