= Dunlop Tyres =

International tire brand

Dunlop

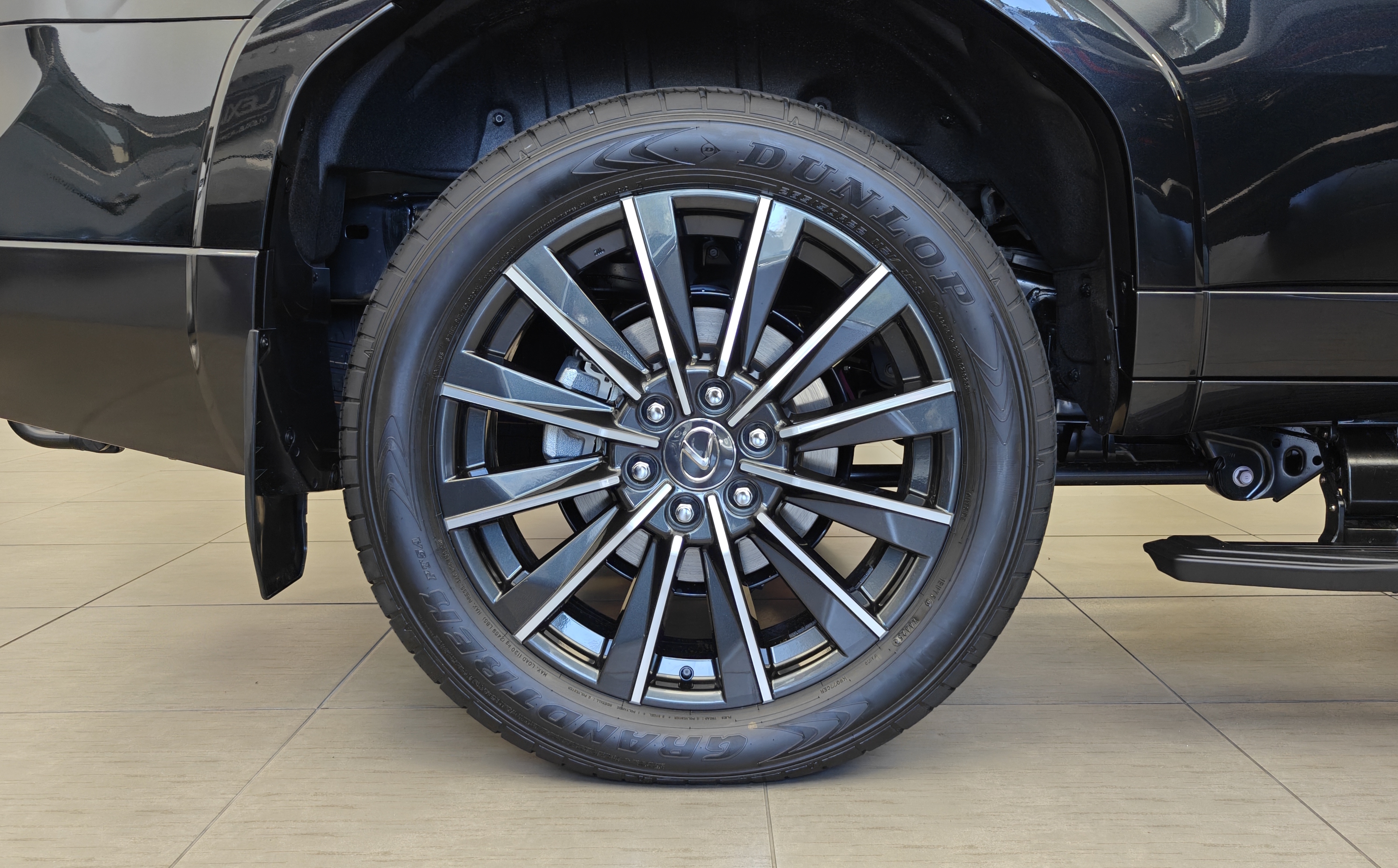
- Dunlop Grandtrek All-Terrain tyre on a new Lexus GX, in Cape Town, 2026
- Product type: Tyres
- Current owner: Sumitomo Rubber Industries (since 2025)
- Produced by: Sumitomo Rubber Industries
- Introduced: 18 November 1888; 137 years ago
- Related brands: Falken
- Markets: Worldwide (17 countries)
- Previous owners: Dunlop Ltd. (1888–1985)
- Tagline: Taking you beyond
- Website: www.dunlop.com

Dunlop is a brand of tyres, currently owned and produced by the Japanese company Sumitomo Rubber Industries. It was founded by pneumatic tyre pioneer John Boyd Dunlop in Belfast, UK, in 1888 , and the commercial company (Dunlop Pneumatic Tyre Co. Ltd.) was founded in 1889 As of 2026, Dunlop has operations in 17 countries.

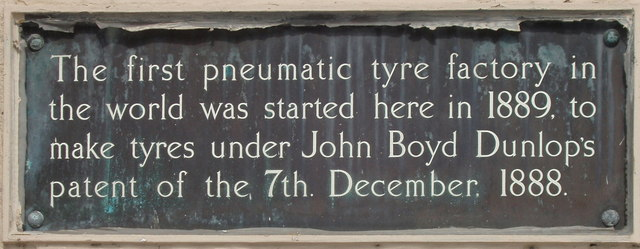
Plaque on the site of the first pneumatic tyre factory on Stephen Street, Dublin

It is one of several largely unrelated companies that use the Dunlop brand under licence, most of which historically evolved from Dunlop Rubber in some way. The brand was formerly operated by Goodyear in North America (for passenger car and light truck tires), Europe, Australia, and New Zealand.

In several countries, including Japan, China, South Africa, Indonesia, Thailand, Vietnam, and much of Latin America, Dunlop Tires is operated directly by Sumitomo, through the company's various subsidiaries. In other markets, certain regional and product-specific rights remain with third parties, as of mid-2026.

== History ==
In 1985, the Dunlop Rubber Company was acquired by now-defunct BTR plc, and Sumitomo acquired the rights to manufacture and market Dunlop branded road tyres. Sumitomo did not acquire any Dunlop company. In 1997 Sumitomo gained agreement to use the Dunlop name in its corporate name, and changed the name of its UK subsidiary to "Dunlop Tyres Ltd."

In 1999, Sumitomo and Goodyear began a joint venture by which Sumitomo continued to manufacture all Japanese-made tyres under the Dunlop name, while Goodyear Tire and Rubber Company bought 75% of the European and North American tyre businesses of Sumitomo.

With the closure of the Washington plant in 2006, Goodyear Dunlop ceased mainstream car and lorry tyre production in the UK.

In 2012, the Dunlop Tyre brand was managed by Continental AG, which manufactures Dunlop branded tyres for sale in Malaysia, Singapore and Brunei.

In January 2013, Dunlop India Ltd entered liquidation proceedings. The local operating entity was established in India in 1926, and was owned by the Ruia Group. The liquidation process was finalized in May 2017.

In October 2015, Sumitomo Rubber Industries acquired the Dunlop motorcycle tyre brand in North America from Goodyear after dissolving its 16-year global joint venture. On 7 January 2025, Goodyear announced the sale of the rest of its Dunlop brand activities (with the exception of motorcycle business in Europe) to SRI, which completed on 7 May 2025.

Until May 2014, Goodyear Dunlop occupied a compact part of the Fort Dunlop site in Birmingham as its UK office. In the UK, the company operates as a sales organisation, importing tyres from manufacturing plants around the world, including Germany, Slovenia and Poland.

In 2016, it was announced that Sumitomo would commence the second phase of its US$131 million investment for the upgrade and expansion of its Dunlop tyre manufacturing plant in Ladysmith, South Africa.

On 3 December 2025, Sumitomo acquired the exclusive rights to use the Dunlop brand from Continental in these countries (excluding the aircraft and winter tyres), effective January 2026.

In August 2026, Dunlop Tyres South Africa completed a 3-year, R1.7 billion investment program at its uMnambithi, KwaZulu-Natal manufacturing facility. The investment introduced new manufacturing technology and expanded production capabilities, to position the facility as a strategic hub for automotive growth across Africa. Dunlop said the plant's upgrades made it among the most technologically advanced tire manufacturing operations on the continent.

== Operations ==
Dunlop has extensive manufacturing operations throughout the world. Countries of operation include:

Country	Local operating entity/subsidiary	Year of establishment of local entity	City of HQ	Type of operations	Ref.
Australia	Dunlop Tyre Australia Pty. Ltd.	2014; 12 years ago	Sydney	Sales and distribution of tyres	
Brazil	Sumitomo Rubber do Brasil Ltda.	2011; 15 years ago	Fazenda Rio Grande	Manufacture and sale of tyres	
Chile	Dunlop Latin America Ltda.	2008; 18 years ago	Santiago	Regional sales and distribution of tyres	
China	Sumitomo Rubber (China) Co., Ltd.; Sumitomo Rubber (Changshu) Co., Ltd.; Dunlop Tire Sales Co., Ltd.	2002; 24 years ago	Shanghai	Manufacture, sale and supervision of tyre business	
Germany	Dunlop Tyre Europe GmbH	2008; 18 years ago	Offenbach am Main	European sales, marketing and distribution	
India	Ralson India	1974; 52 years ago	Ludhiana	Manufacture and marketing of Dunlop-branded two- and three-wheeler tyres	
Indonesia	PT Sumi Rubber Indonesia	1995; 31 years ago	Jakarta	Manufacture and sale of tyres	
Japan	DUNLOP TYRE JAPAN, LTD.	2024; 2 years ago	Tokyo	Domestic replacement tyre sales	
Malaysia	Sumitomo Rubber Industries, Ltd.	2026; 0 years ago	Kobe	Sales of Dunlop tyres, tubes and flaps	
Mexico	TBC de México, S.A. de C.V.	1994; 32 years ago	San Luis Potosí	Distribution of Dunlop tyres	
Singapore	Sumitomo Rubber Asia (Tyre) Pte. Ltd.; Sumitomo Rubber Singapore Pte. Ltd.	2001; 25 years ago	Singapore	Regional sales and procurement; Dunlop tyre sales	
South Africa	Sumitomo Rubber South Africa (Pty) Ltd	2013; 13 years ago	Durban	Manufacture, sale and marketing of tyres; African Dunlop rights	
Taiwan	Dunlop Taiwan Co., Ltd.	1980; 46 years ago	Taipei	Sales of tyres and sporting goods	
Thailand	Dunlop Tire (Thailand) Co., Ltd.; Sumitomo Rubber (Thailand) Co., Ltd.	2006; 20 years ago	Bangkok	Tyre sales; manufacture and sale of tyres	
Turkey	Sumitomo Rubber AKO Lastik Sanayi ve Ticaret A.Ş.	2013; 13 years ago	Çankırı	Manufacture and sale of tyres	
United Arab Emirates	Dunlop Tyre Middle East FZE	2008; 18 years ago	Dubai	Regional sales, marketing and technical support for the Middle East and North Africa	
United States	Dunlop Tires North America, Inc.	2026; 0 years ago	Rancho Cucamonga	Sales and distribution of tyres; North American Dunlop business	
Total	17 countries	—	—	—	—

== Motorsport ==
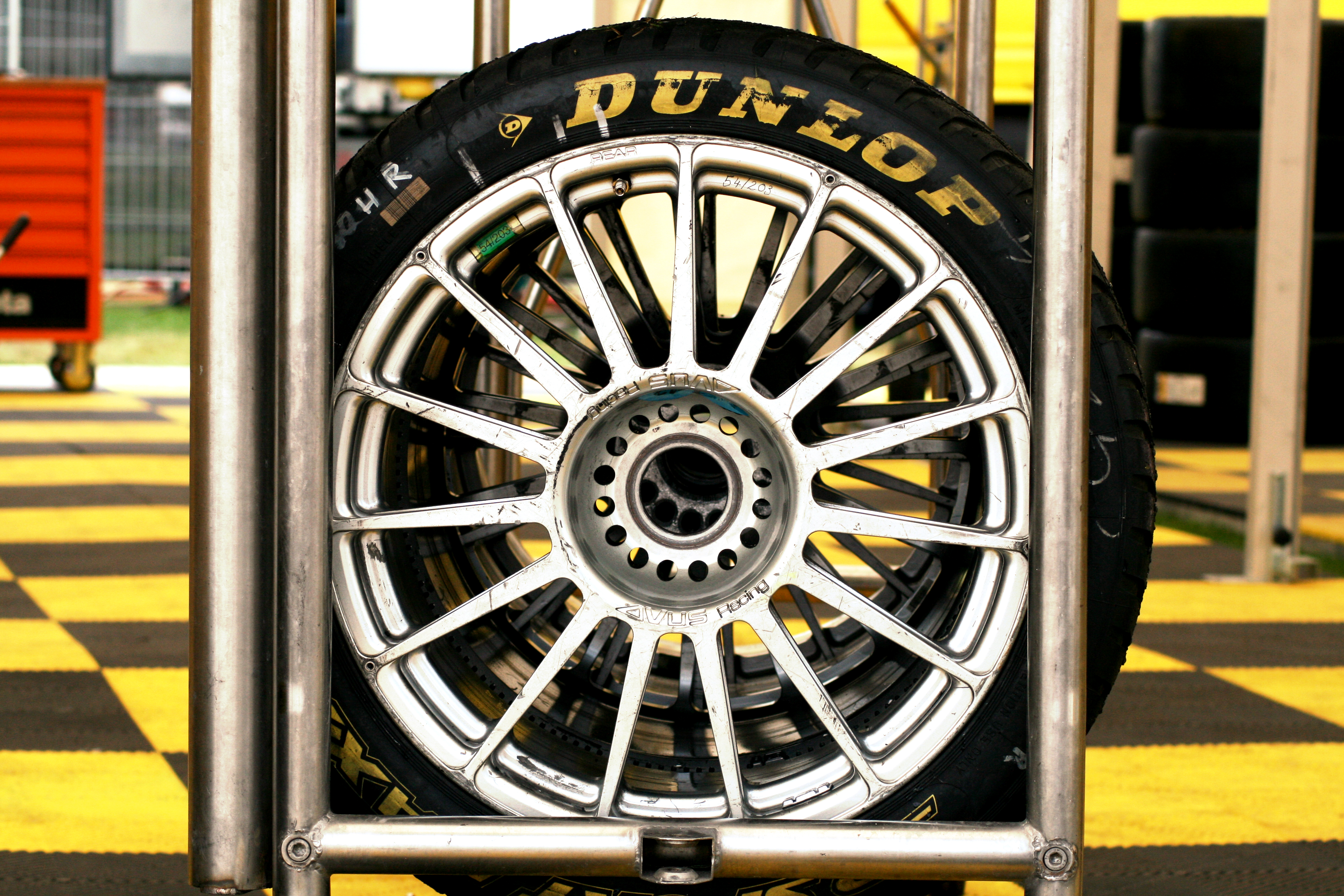
Dunlop high-performance tire

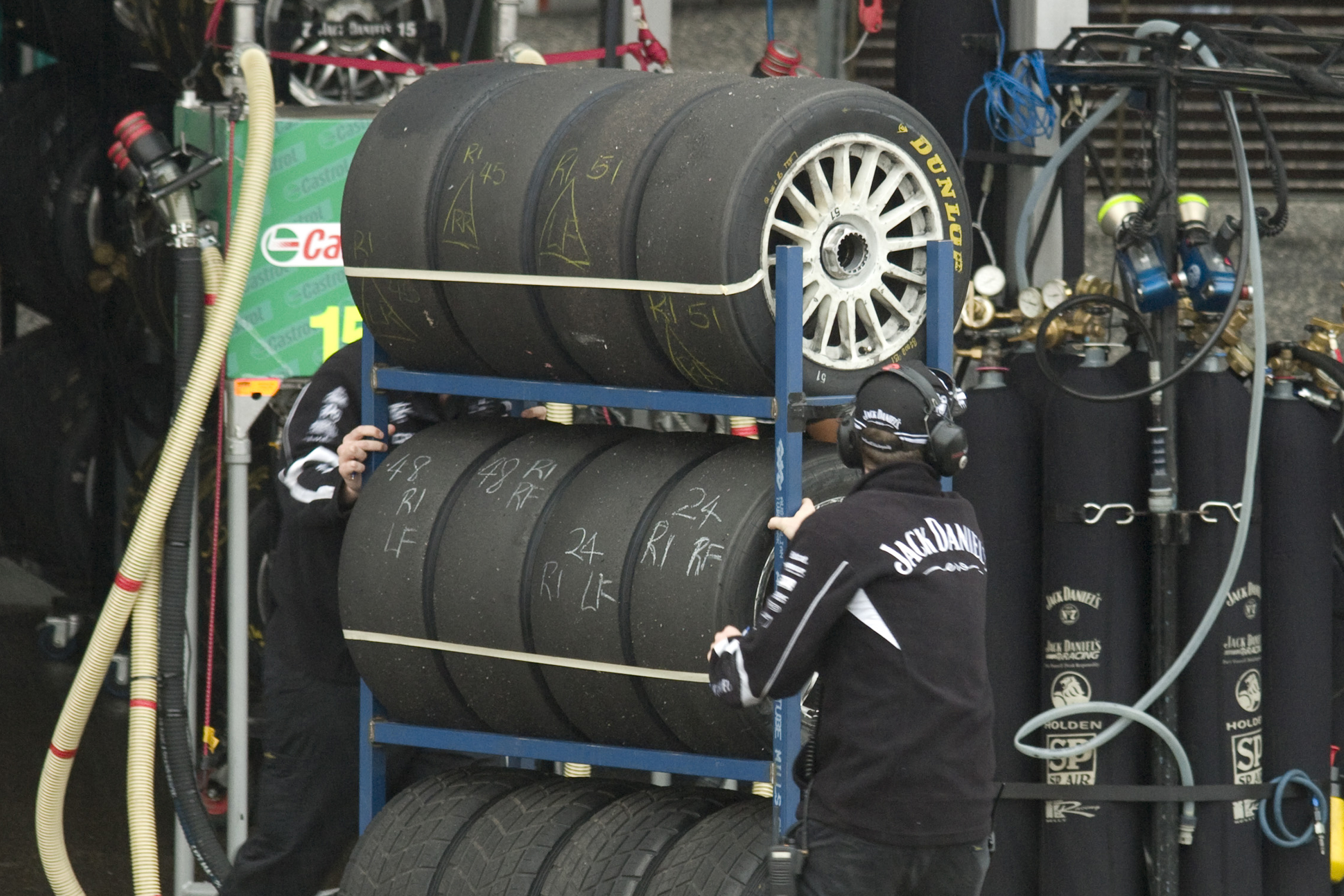
Dunlop Tyres is the official tyre supplier of the Supercars Championship.

Dunlop Tyres currently supply tyres to the Supercars Championship and Super2 Series, the latter of which Dunlop also serves as the series title sponsor. The company also supplies tyres to select racing teams in the Super GT series in both GT500 and GT300 classes. Dunlop Tyres is also involved in major endurance races, including the Nürburgring 24 Hours, supplying as many as 4,000 tyres to participating racing teams.

Dunlop Tyres was also a major tyre supplier in the Group C sports prototype and early Group GT1 eras, and have previously won the 24 Hours of Le Mans overall and in class with Dunlop-shod sports cars.

The company is one of three tyre suppliers of the FIM Endurance World Championship.

On 20 September 2025, Dunlop Tyres entered the sim racing scene for the first time, as they became the official tyre partner for Gran Turismo 7 and its respective esports tournament, the Gran Turismo World Series.

=== Fort Dunlop ===
Fort Dunlop was a motorsport manufacturing operation located in a corner of the original Dunlop factory in Erdington, Birmingham, established in 1891 until May 2014. This factory produced specialised vintage, motorcycle and touring car tyres, and produced about 300,000 specialised racing tyres per year. On 30 May 2014, the Birmingham factory ceased tyre production, ending Dunlop motorsport tyre production in the UK.

== See also ==
- Dunlop Bridge
