= Colin Smith (engineer) =

Colin Smith CBE FRS FREng FRAeS FIMechE
- Born: Colin P. Smith; 1955 or 1956 (age 70–71)
- Education: University of Southampton (BSc)
- Known for: Executive Director of Rolls-Royce; Rolls-Royce Trent 500; Rolls-Royce Trent 700
- Awards: FRS (2014); CBE (2012); FRAeS; FIMechE; FREng; DSc (Oxon)
- Scientific career
- Workplaces: Rolls-Royce Holdings plc
- Website: www.rolls-royce.com/about/whoweare/board/smith

Colin P. Smith (born 1955 or 1956 (age 70–71)) was director of engineering and technology at Rolls-Royce plc.

== Career ==
Smith was employed in numerous roles during his 40 years at Rolls-Royce since 1974. He was chief design engineer for the Rolls-Royce Trent 500, which powers the Airbus A340. He was also the chief engineer for the Rolls-Royce Trent 700 engine used on the Airbus A330 and chief engineer for the Rolls-Royce Turbomeca RTM322 helicopter engine. He was appointed to the board of directors at Rolls-Royce in July 2005.

== Education ==
Smith was educated at the University of Southampton where he was awarded a Bachelor of Science degree in mechanical engineering.

== Awards and honours ==
Smith was elected a Fellow of the Royal Society (FRS) in 2014. His nomination reads:

Colin Smith is an extremely able engineer with exceptional technical and personal skills blending a combination of theory and pragmatism to lead around 16,000 professional engineers for one of the UK’s premier engineering companies. He has progressed through Rolls-Royce plc, being appointed to the Main Board in 2005. As an executive director of the company, Colin’s main responsibility is to direct and lead the total engineering activity from envisioning future technology, investment in research, delivering development programmes and trouble-free service of its products. Colin’s ability to integrate advanced technologies has enabled Rolls-Royce to make a sustained contribution to the UK.

In 2017, Smith was elected a member of the National Academy of Engineering for leadership in design, technologies, and manufacturing processes that enhance airworthiness, safety, and environmental sustainability of large aeroengines.

Smith was awarded Commander of the Most Excellent Order of the British Empire (CBE), in the 2012 Birthday Honours. He is also an Honorary Fellow of the Royal Aeronautical Society (HonFRAeS), the Institution of Mechanical Engineers (FIMechE) and a member of the Council for Science and Technology. Smith was awarded an honorary Doctor of Science degree from the University of Oxford.
