= Dunlop Bridge =

Landmark advertising footbridge

The Dunlop Bridge is a landmark advertising footbridge sponsored by Dunlop, located at several racing circuits around the world. The oldest surviving example of this bridge is at the Circuit de la Sarthe, the home of the 24 Hours of Le Mans.

The bridge is regarded as one of the most recognisable features at a motorsport venue, particularly the Circuit de la Sarthe and Donington Park, although the latter was removed during renovations for the failed attempt to stage the 2010 British Grand Prix, and due to new racing safety regulations, cannot be restored.

In December 2025, the Automobile Club de l'Ouest and Goodyear announced that the historic Dunlop Bridge at the Circuit de la Sarthe would be replaced with a Goodyear-branded bridge as part of a strategic enhancement of the 24 Hours of Le Mans experience. The new bridge will be built on the structure of the existing Dunlop Bridge and reflects a strengthened partnership between the ACO and Goodyear, which includes upgrades to several circuit facilities such as the Goodyear Racing Club and the Goodyear Grandstand. To honour the legacy of the original structure, a collection of Dunlop Bridge memorabilia will be donated to the 24 Hours of Le Mans Museum. These changes form part of broader efforts to enrich spectator amenities and brand presence at the event.

Radio and television personality Chris Evans bought the Donington Park bridge while visiting a racing memorabilia auction in September 2012.

== List of race circuits featuring a Dunlop Bridge ==
Italics indicate that the bridge is no longer within the circuit.

Photo	Venue	Section	Locale	Installed	Dismantled	Source	Notes
	Circuit de la Sarthe	Dunlop Curve	Le Mans, Sarthe, France	1932	2026		(Note: Relocated to its present location at the between 1986 and 1987 to allow for the insertion of a chicane.)
	Suzuka Circuit	Turn 7	Suzuka, Mie, Japan	1960s	1987		
	Surfers Paradise Raceway	Turn 1	Surfers Paradise, Queensland, Australia	1966	1987		
	Donington Park	Starkey's Straight	Leicestershire, England	1977	2009		(Note: Originally dismantled to allow a proposed 200mph straight to be created, since work fell through due to financial reasons, the bridge is currently in a dismantled state after it was not restorable due to racing regulations.)
	Mount Panorama Circuit	Exit of The Chase	Bathurst, New South Wales, Australia	1982			Renamed the Century Batteries Bridge in 2022
	Sandown Raceway	Turn 9	Melbourne, Victoria, Australia	1989			(Note: Sandown Raceway originally had a Dunlop Bridge from 1964-1984 located at the Turn 9 causeway. The base of the old bridge was not protected by barriers and was the site of many high speed crashes and was removed on safety grounds during circuit re-configuration in mid-1984. Sandown's current bridge was originally the Dunlop Bridge which stood at the Surfers Paradise Raceway from 1966 until the circuit closed in 1987, has been since been modified and renamed the Jim Beam Bridge.)
	Tsukuba Circuit	Midfield	Shimotsuma, Ibaraki Japan				
	WeatherTech Raceway Laguna Seca	Turn 3	Monterey, California, United States				(Note: Various other tire brands also advertised on Laguna Seca's Dunlop Bridge.)
	Mantorp Park		Mantorp, Östergötland, Sweden				
	Circuit Paul Armagnac	Turn 11	Nogaro, Midi-Pyrénées, France				
	Sportsland SUGO	Home straight	Murata, Miyagi, Japan				
	Circuit d'Albi		Le Séquestre, Midi-Pyrénées, France				
	Circuit Carole	Home straight	Tremblay-en-France, Île-de-France, France				
	Autodrome de Linas-Montlhéry	Home straight	Linas, Île-de-France, France				

Although not on a racing circuit, a Dunlop Bridge was erected in 1985 over the Sturt Highway in Yamba, South Australia to coincide with the 1985 Australian Grand Prix.

A Dunlop Bridge also exists in the Apricot Hill Raceway, a fictional racetrack in the Gran Turismo series, although the branding was removed in Gran Turismo 6.

== See also ==
- Red Bull, who also have a distinctive footbridge at race events.
