= Dunlop Standard Aerospace Group =

Company

Dunlop Standard Aerospace Group Ltd
- Predecessor: BTR Aerospace Group
- Founded: 1998
- Defunct: 2004
- Successors: Standard Aero; Meggitt

Dunlop Standard Aerospace Group Ltd. was formed in 1998 from the assets of British BTR Aerospace Group when they were purchased by Doughty Hanson & Co.

In 2004 the company was sold and split into two. The Carlyle Group, a U.S. private equity firm, acquired the Standard Aero division, now known as StandardAero. StandardAero is an aviation maintenance, repair and overhaul company headquartered in Tempe, Arizona.

British Meggitt plc acquired the Dunlop Aerospace Design and Manufacturing division.

== See also ==
- Aerospace industry in the United Kingdom
