= John Bull Rubber =

British tyre manufacturer

- Formerly: Leicester Rubber Company
- Industry: Tyre manufacturing
- Founded: 1906; 119 years ago in Leicester, UK
- Founders: John Cecil and Hubert Henry Burton
- Defunct: 1958
- Fate: Acquired by Dunlop Rubber
- Products: Bicycle tyres

John Bull Rubber Co. Ltd. was a British tyre manufacturer based in Leicester. It was established 1906 and was originally named Leicester Rubber Company. It was renamed John Bull Rubber in 1934 after its popular product of the same name.

== History ==
The Leicester Rubber Company was set up in 1906 by two brothers, John Cecil Burton and Hubert Henry Burton, who imported and sold bicycle tyres.

In 1915, a new factory was built in Evington Valley Road, where the company started manufacturing its own cycle and pram tyres.

In 1937, the company formed an offshoot called Metalastic, which specialised in rubber to metal components. The two companies merged in 1955.

In 1958, the company was acquired by Dunlop Rubber.

== Gallery ==
John Bull Rubber Co. Ltd.

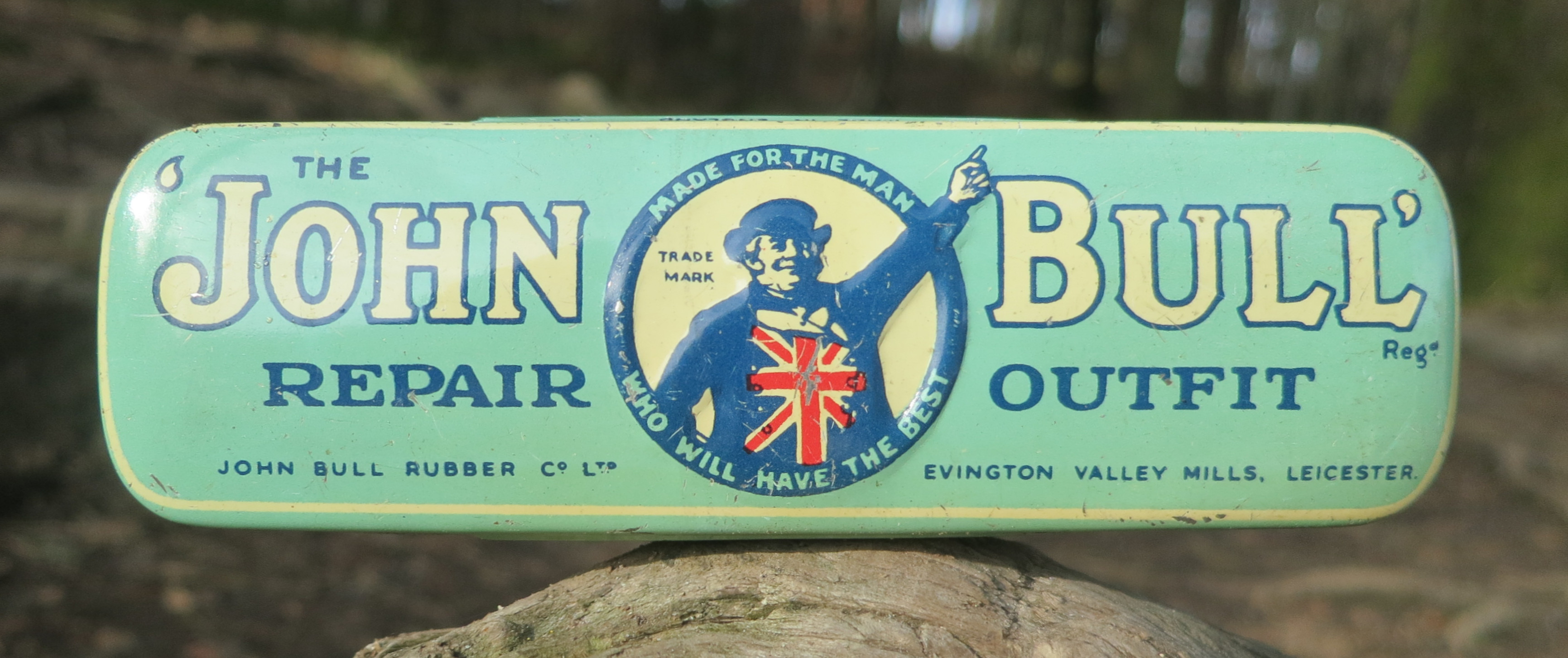
1950s "The John Bull repair outfit" tyre repair kit by John Bull Rubber Co. Ltd.

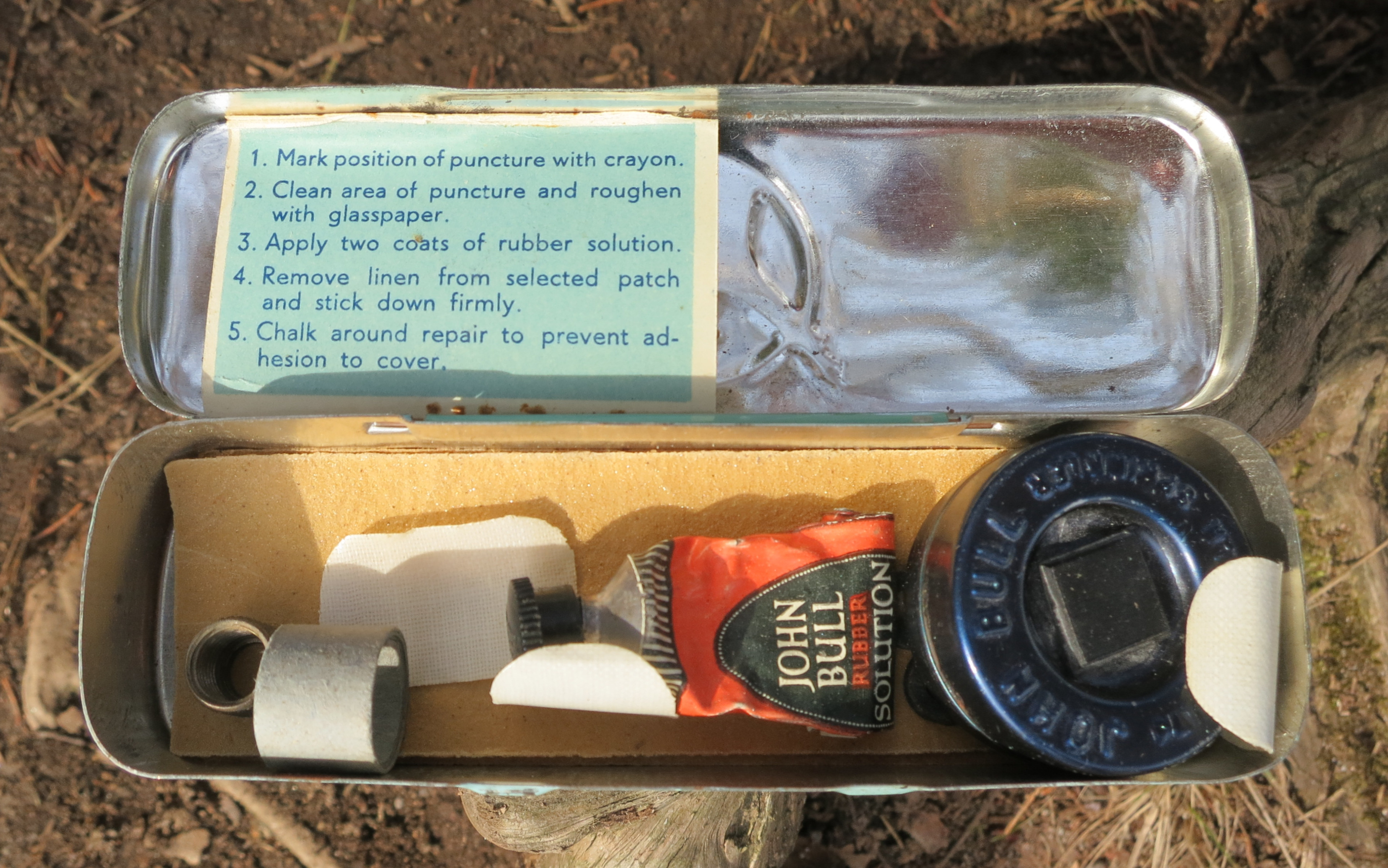
Contents (incomplete) of the 1950s "The John Bull repair outfit".
