= Terry Twigger =

British businessman (born 1949)

- Born: Terence Twigger; 21 November 1949 (age 76)
- Education: Bristol University
- Occupations: Chairman, Auctus Industries
- Years active: 1970–present
- Title: CEO, Meggitt
- Term: 2001 – May 2013
- Predecessor: Mike Stacey
- Successor: Stephen Young

Terence Twigger FCA (born 21 November 1949) is a British businessman. He was the chief executive (CEO) of Meggitt plc, a British engineering business specialising in aerospace equipment, from 2001 to May 2013.

== Early life ==
He has a bachelor's degree in Economics and Accountancy from Bristol University. After leaving university he worked for Deloitte & Touche for five years, during which time he qualified as a chartered accountant.

== Career ==
He was CEO of Meggitt from January 2001 to May 2013, having joined the company in 1993, and was finance director since 1995. Before that, he spent 15 years with Lucas Aerospace, rising to finance director.

Since 2013, Twigger has been the chairman of Auctus Industries, which he co-founded with Valerio Massimo di Roccasecca and Edward Spencer Churchill.

He is a non-executive director of Filtrona plc and senior non-executive director of XP Power plc.

He is a fellow of the Institute of Chartered Accountants in England and Wales and a member of the Society of British Aerospace Companies and the Royal Aeronautical Society.
