= Ardex GmbH =

German building materials company

ARDEX GmbH
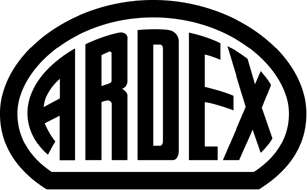
- Type: GmbH
- Industry: Chemical industry
- Founded: 1949; 77 years ago
- Headquarters: Witten, Germany
- Key people: Mark Eslamlooy (chair); Dr. Ulrich Dahlhoff; Dr. Hubert Motzet; Uwe Stockhausen; Dr. Markus Stolper
- Products: Chemical building products, building adhesives
- Revenue: approx. €850m (2018)
- Number of employees: approx. 3,300 (2019)
- Website: www.ardex.com

ARDEX GmbH is a manufacturer of special materials for the building trade with its global headquarters based in Witten, Germany. The company is operated as an independent family-owned business by Mark Eslamlooy, CEO ARDEX Group and CEO of ARDEX Germany. In 2018, the ARDEX Group, represented by 18 brands, made a turnover of €850 million with 3,300 staff.

The company belongs to the market leaders in the field of chemistry-based construction materials, and is represented in more than 100 countries through 55 subsidiaries and 44 production facilities. Founded in 1949, under the name Norwag-Werke GmbH Chemische Fabrik, Witten, the company initially manufactured metal-working oils, window putty and waxes. At the beginning of the 1950, the company was renamed Ardex Chemie GmbH.

The company managed to reduce the drying periods of sub-floor smoothing compounds. This invention enabled the company to manufacture "quick-setting" screeds, which become fully usable after 24 hours, i.e. installation of the finish top cover is possible after 24 hours. For conventional screeds, the drying period required is about 28 days even today. Using the "quick-setting smoothing compounds", top floor cover can be laid as soon as after one hour.

In the course of the years, the product range was extended and today comprises all relevant ranges of chemistry-based construction products: building products for concrete finishing and repair, bitumen-based products for waterproofing of building structures, quick-setting cements, screeds, sub-floor preparation agents, sub-floor smoothing compounds, epoxy-based industrial floor coverings for floor areas in private and industrial premises, sealing compounds to be applied beneath tiles, adhesives for tiles, natural stones and insulating materials, joint mortar for tiles and marble, sealing compounds for the building trade, wall smoothing compounds for smoothing wall surfaces, floor covering and parquetry adhesives for carpets and parquetry etc.
