= Fort Dunlop =

Office building in Birmingham, England

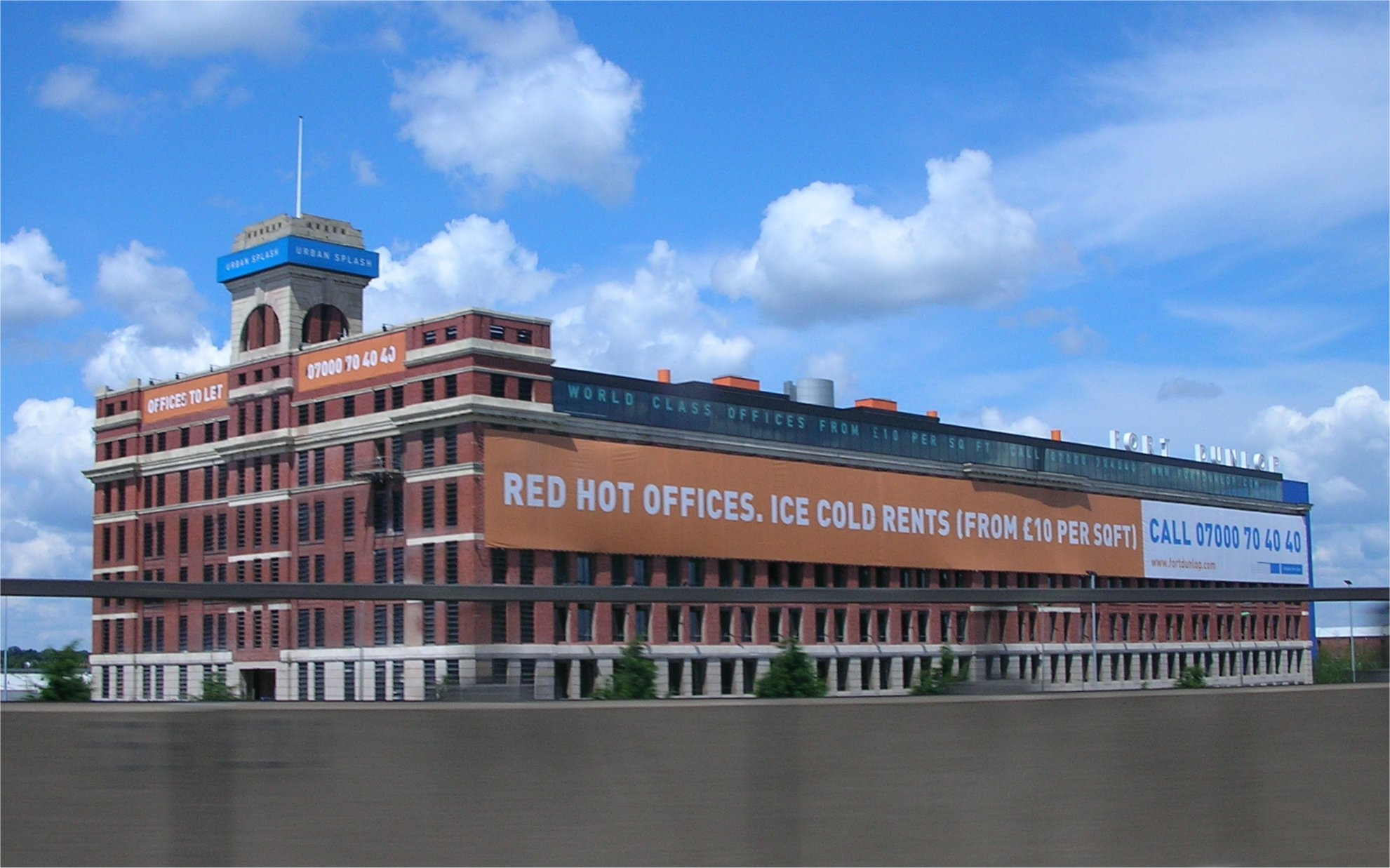
- Fort Dunlop from the M6 motorway, 2007
- Interactive map of the Fort Dunlop area

General information
- Type: Office, retail Birmingham, England
- Coordinates: 52.5097°N 1.8120°W
- Construction started: 1916
- Completed: 1920s (2006 in current form)

Height
- Height: 24 metres (79 ft)

Technical details
- Floor count: 7

Design and construction
- Architects: 1920s: Sidney Stott and W.W. Gibbings; 2007: Hazel Rounding of shedkm
- Main contractor: Urban Splash Ltd
- Awards and prizes: Grade A locally listed

Fort Dunlop (grid reference SP129902), is the common name of the original tyre factory and main office of Dunlop Rubber in the Erdington district of Birmingham, England. It was established in 1917, and by 1954 the entire factory area employed 10,000 workers. At one time it was the world's largest factory, when it employed 3,200 workers.

Fort Dunlop, the main building of the former factory area, is next to the M6 motorway, near to junction 5. It is a Grade A locally listed building. It was designed by Sidney Stott and W. W. Gibbings in the 1920s. The building's use was the storage of tyres and was called Base stores. An almost identical building housing administrative and general offices was located on Wood Lane. Dunlop Tyres now occupies a small part of the building.

== History ==
The Dunlop Rubber Co. Ltd was set up in Birmingham in 1901 to manufacture Dunlop tyres, initially for bicycles and later for motor vehicles. The First World War initiated a huge expansion in the demand for solid tyres for lorries, and the Fort Dunlop factory was built in 1916 on a 120-hectare site on the east side of Birmingham. Post-war, the motor industry grew and Dunlop was well placed to supply the demand for tyres. In the 1970s it was still the largest tyre factory outside the United States. However, by this stage foreign cars were becoming increasingly popular, resulting in a decline in demand. The company was sold in the 1980s and large-scale tyre production ceased at Fort Dunlop after some 70 years. Dunlop Tyres continued to produce specialised vintage, motorcycle and motorsport tyres on the site. The factory finally closed in September 2014 after nearly 100 years, with production moving to Germany and France. This move also spelled the end of 123 years of British production by the company. Dunlop Aircraft Tyres continue to be manufactured in the only remaining part of the site at what is now called Fort Parkway. The company is independently owned has now been producing aircraft tyres on this site since its inception in 1916.

== Redevelopment ==
The company Urban Splash acquired the building and the 4.02 hectares (9.9 acres) of land from English Partnerships in 1999 and started work developing proposals in conjunction with Advantage West Midlands, the regional development agency who funded the reclamation of the land. Urban Splash possess the building by a 999-year lease from Advantage West Midlands.

The Fort Dunlop building, derelict for twenty years (with the exterior used as advertising space), has been redeveloped into an office and retail space with an adjoining Travelodge hotel. Work on the redevelopment commenced in December 2004. It now has 300,000 square feet (28,000 m^{2}) of office space within the main building as well as recreational leisure space. There are also 1,150 basement and surface car parking spaces. The developers were Urban Splash and the architects were Liverpool-based Hazel Rounding of shedkm. The landscape designer for the building's setting was Martha Schwartz Inc.

By March 2005, all windows and poor quality extensions were removed to reveal the shell. The steel structure which would house the 100-bed Travelodge hotel began construction and the largest advertisement hoarding in the world at that time was constructed on the front of the building. The steel structure was completed in June 2005 along with the roof structure. The concrete was added to the steel structure two months later. They were manufactured offsite and transported to the building where they were fitted into place. They contained the circular holes on one side to allow for the circular windows. By the end of 2005, the windows were being added to the inside of the building. The outside structure was left as it was and the glass structure was built behind it. The assembly work had been completed to the adjacent structure and work had begun to paint it dark blue with a sign saying "FORT DUNLOP" added to the top of the structure by March 2006. The sign is illuminated at night The skyline signage, with its programmable, RGB LED illumination resulted in three separate industry awards for ASG, the company that designed, manufactured and installed the structures.

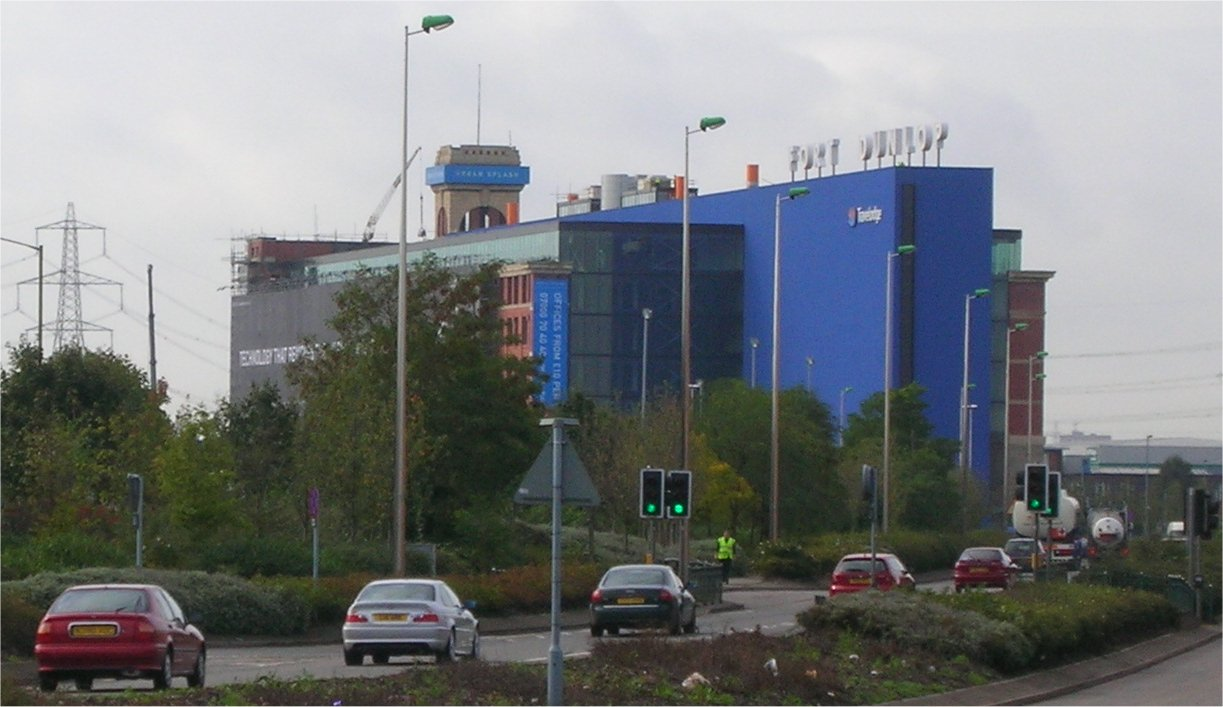
Fort Dunlop under redevelopment, 2006

By June 2006, the windows had been fitted to the Travelodge and the hotel opened to the public. Window work on the inside of the old building was being completed and the floor layouts were being defined.

Fort Dunlop opened by a ceremony on 1 December 2006. The roof was covered by soil and grass, the largest such grass roof in the United Kingdom; it provides natural insulation and a wildlife reserve.

In August 2006, Urban Splash announced that three retail companies were to move to Fort Dunlop; house accessory specialist Dwell, relocating from the Custard Factory, Snap Galleries and a Birmingham-based coffee outlet named The Daily Grind Coffee Company. Another company, Boxer, a design consultancy, was announced as the first tenant, relocating from their base in Coleshill.

In 2015, Fort Dunlop had over 30 businesses in its office space, including: Trinity Mirror Midlands; Whistle PR; Ford Retail; Skills First; Nicol Thomas; and Overbury.

In 2017, Trinity Mirror Midlands relocated back to Birmingham City Centre having occupied the entire 6th floor of the building – all 53,582 square feet (4,978 m^{2}). At over one acre in area, it was the largest open plan office space in the country outside of London.

During 2018, the 6th floor was refurbished offering the largest available floor plate in Birmingham at over 27,000 square feet (2,500 m^{2}).

== Architecture ==
The early structure is of concrete, clad to a steel frame. Upon redevelopment, it was found that the steel frame had moved no more than 2 mm (0.1 in), a reflection of the quality of construction. The building is 52 metres (171 ft) deep. The south side measures 24 metres (79 ft) in height and 130 metres (427 ft) in width. The extension housing the Travelodge hotel extends 170 metres (558 ft) from the building, and has a width of 8 metres (26 ft). The northern facade is of slightly different architecture from the remainder of the building as it was damaged during World War II by bombing raids by the Luftwaffe.

A circular light well was constructed from the roof to the atrium at the reception, allowing natural light to illuminate the middle of the building. At each floor, the light well is lined with steel to represent the industrial heritage of the building.
