= Meggitt =

British international aerospace company

Meggitt Ltd.
- Formerly: Meggitt plc
- Type: Subsidiary
- Industry: Aerospace; Defence; Energy
- Founded: 1947; 79 years ago
- Headquarters: Coventry, England, UK
- Key people: Sir Nigel Rudd (Chairman); Tony Wood (CEO)
- Revenue: ▼£1,489.2 million (2021)
- Operating income: ▲£63.4 million (2021)
- Net income: ▲£31.2 million (2021)
- Number of employees: 9,000 (2021)
- Parent: Parker Hannifin
- Website: www.meggitt.com

Parker Meggitt (legally Meggitt Ltd) is a British international company specialising in components and sub-systems for the aerospace, defence and selected energy markets. It was listed on the London Stock Exchange and was a constituent of the FTSE 100 Index until it was acquired by Parker Hannifin in September 2022.

== History ==
=== Origins ===
The company's history spans back to multiple preceding businesses that were originally founded in both the nineteenth and twentieth centuries. Meggitt's own official history claims that the company's roots can be traced through to 1850 via the scientific instrumentation business Negretti and Zambra, which had, amongst other innovations, invented the world's first altimeter for the hot air balloon.

During 1947, a new business was founded under the trading name Willson Lathes; it operated as a machine tool manufacturer based in Halifax, West Yorkshire. That same year, Willson Lathes became a quoted public company. During 1964, Meggitt, a Dorset-based light engineering business, was wholly acquired by Willson Lathes; subsequently, management decided to change the company's name to Meggitt Holdings.

=== 1980–1999 ===
During 1983, Nigel McCorkell and Ken Coates, together with 3i, took control of Meggitt via a management buyout. The new management team soon embarked on a series of acquisitions, aimed at increasing the business' geographical diversity to become an international engineering company; it focused on speciality sectors within fields such as aerospace, controls, electronics and energy. During 1985, Meggitt Holdings acquired London-based avionics specialist Negretti and Zambra. In 1986, the company bought the engineering interest Bestobell, which had historically focused on aviation air ducting and sealing solutions.

Following the appointment of Michael Stacey as the CEO of Meggitt Holdings in 1990, the company was reorganised to focus its efforts around three core markets: aerospace, defence systems and electronics. Further acquisitions were conducted during the 1990s. In 1992, Meggitt acquired sensor specialist firm Endevco, specialists in sensors for test and measurement applications. During 1998, engine diagnostics specialist Vibro-Meter was also acquired to improve the company's portfolio of condition monitoring capabilities. In the following year, Californian aviation aftermarket support firm Whittaker Corporation was also acquired by Meggitt for $380m.

During July 1997, Meggitt received their first contract from American commercial airline manufacturer Boeing to provide solid-state clocks for the Boeing 737; separately, it was contracted to provide the secondary flight display system for the Lockheed Martin F-35 Lightning II. That same year Spanish aviation company CASA appointed it to supply the air ducting system for its new C-295 utility transport aircraft. In 1998, Raytheon Aircraft awarded the company a contract to supply solid state altimeters and secondary flight display systems for numerous business aircraft, including the Beech King Air, Beech 1900D, Hawker 800XP and Hawker Horizon, in its lineup. Later that year, Boeing announced that Meggitt would be its sole supplier of solid-state electronic standby instrumentation for all of its airlines.

=== 2000–2009 ===
During 2001, a new CEO, Terry Twigger, took over at Meggitt. The company continued to expand through numerous acquisitions throughout the 2000s. In 2002, it arranged to acquire Lodge (Brothers), a British manufacturer of speed and temperature sensors for aero engines, from Smiths Aerospace. During the following year, Meggitt bought Western Design, which manufactured automated ammunition-handling apparatus and environmental control systems. In 2003, it acquired Caswell International, a provider of high-tech live fire training systems. During 2004, the company, in cooperation with The Carlyle Group, bought the Dunlop Standard Aerospace Group's design and manufacturing divisions; the deal included Dunlop Aerospace Braking Systems, Dunlop Ice Protection & Composites, Dunlop Precision Rubber; Dunlop Equipment, Serck Aviation, and Stewart Warner South Wind. This rapid acquisition rate led to Meggitt's high increases in annual revenue around this period.

During 2005, Meggitt acquired sensors and electronics specialist Sensorex; that same year, it also bought ECET, an airborne electronic equipment and ignition systems manufacturer, as well as refuelling equipment specialist Avery-Hardoll. In 2006, the company purchased both simulation provider Firearms Training Systems and compressor producer Airdynamics. By this point, the North American market comprised around 50 per cent of the firm's revenue stream. A year later, Meggitt acquired K&F Industries, the parent company of the Aircraft Braking Systems Corporation. During 2008, it bought Ferroperm Piezoceramics A/S, which manufactured high quality piezoceramic materials for sensors.

The company launched several products throughout the decade, such as the Meggitt Avionics new Generation Integrated Cockpit (MAGIC) for business aircraft, bleed air leak detection (BALD) system, and its Electro-Thermal-based Ice Protection (ETIP) system, often choosing to promote its latest entries at the biennial Farnborough Air Show. Meggitt has been a long time supplier of Brazilian aircraft manufacturer Embraer; in 2018, it was announced that the company had been selected to provide various systems, including the pneumatic bleed air system, brake control system, and carbon brake units, of the firm's Legacy 450/500 business jet. Meggitt's vibration monitoring system was also integrated into multiple platforms, including the CFM International CFM56, General Electric GEnx, Rolls-Royce Trent and PowerJet SaM146 turbofan engines, amongst others.

=== 2010–2020 ===
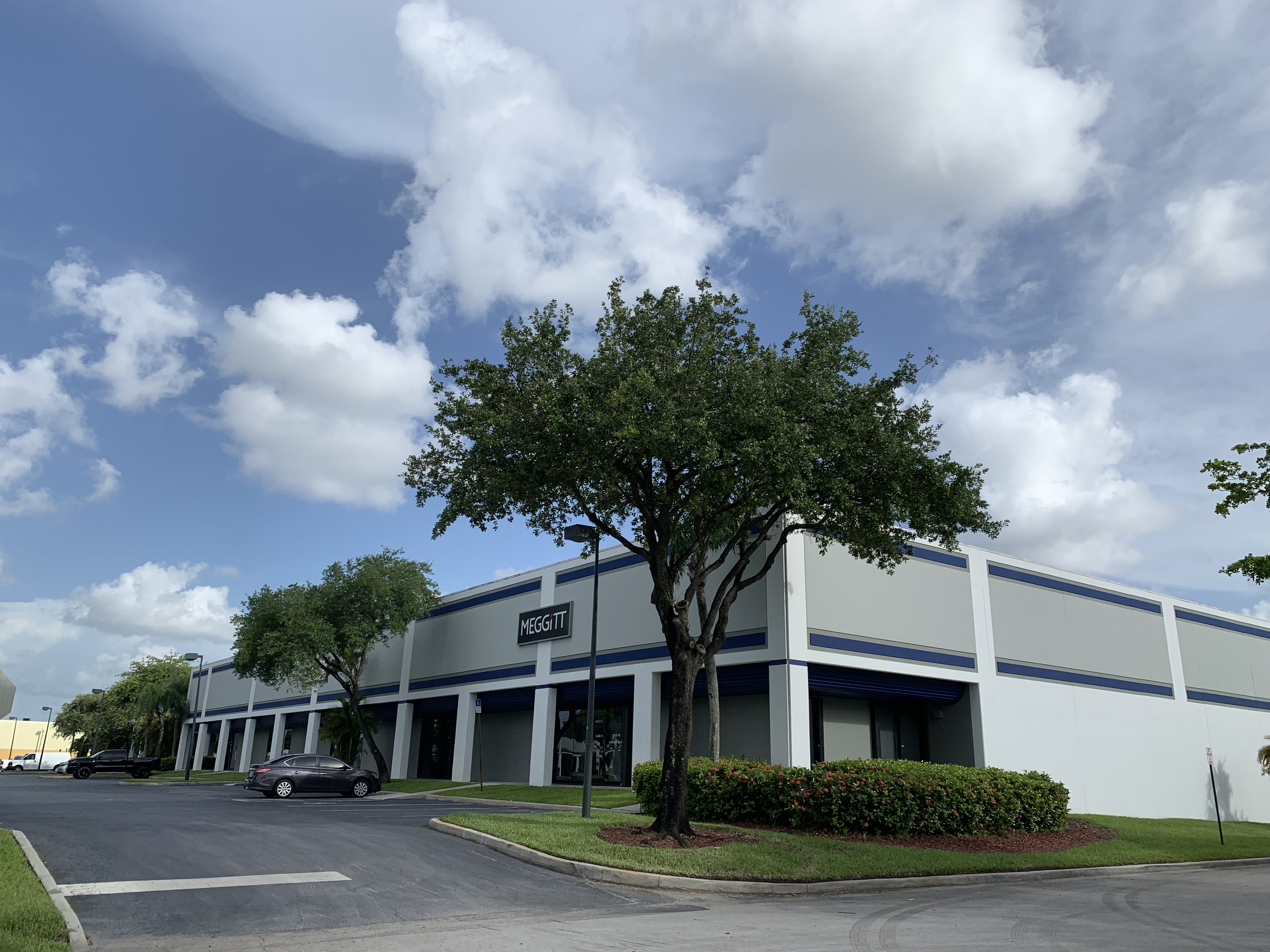
Meggitt facility at Miami, Florida, United States

In 2010, the company restructured itself into five new divisions; consequently, all business units of Meggitt have operated thereafter through divisional management.

In 2011, Meggitt acquired the Pacific Scientific Aerospace Group, a component supplier of both civilian and military aerospace sectors; this acquisition included Securaplane Technologies Inc., an aerospace camera and battery supplier involved in producing GS Yuasa's batteries for the Boeing 787 Dreamliner fleet, which was grounded in January 2013 due to multiple onboard battery fires. Subsequent investigation found that the charger was not at fault for the battery defects, clearing Meggitt products of culpability for the fires.

During 2013, Meggitt's finance director, Stephen Young, took over as its CEO following Terry Twigger's retirement. In 2016, Tony Wood joined Meggitt as its CEO, becoming Chief Executive during the following year after Stephen Young's retirement.

During 2015, the company began to build up its composites division via the acquisition of British manufacturer EDAC, as well as the advanced composites division of Cobham PLC.

In 2018, Meggitt announced plans to relocate its UK headquarters from Bournemouth Airport to a purpose-built facility in Ansty, Warwickshire.

In 2021, Parker Hannifin made an offer for the company, valuing it at £6.3 billion. The transaction was approved by the UK Court on 9 September 2022, and the acquisition completed on 13 September.

== Products ==
Products include a series of target drones, the Meggitt Banshee, sold to QinetiQ in 2016 for £57.5 million.

== See also ==
- Aerospace industry in the United Kingdom
