= List of golf equipment manufacturers =

The following is a list of notable golf equipment manufacturers.

== Current ==
- Acushnet Company
- Adams Golf
- Aldila (shafts)
- Ben Hogan Golf Company
- Ben Sayers
- Bettinardi Golf
- Bridgestone Golf
- Buggies Unlimited
- Callaway Golf Company
- Cleveland Golf
- Club Car
- Cobra Golf
- Dunlop Sport
- Element 21
- FootJoy, a brand of Acushnet, subsidiary of Fila
- Forgan of St Andrews
- John Letters
- Lamkin Grips
- MacGregor Golf
- Maxfli
- Mizuno
- Odyssey Golf, a Callaway Golf brand
- Penfold Golf
- PING
- Pinnacle Golf, a brand of Acushnet, a subsidiary of Fila
- Polara Golf
- PowaKaddy
- Precision Golf Forging
- Puma
- PXG
- Scotty Cameron, a brand of Acushnet, a subsidiary of Fila
- Slazenger
- Srixon
- STX
- TaylorMade
- Titleist, a brand of Acushnet, a subsidiary of Fila
- Vokey Design (Bob Vokey), a brand of Acushnet, a subsidiary of Fila
- Volvik
- Wilson Staff
- Yonex

== Former ==
- Preceptor Golf
- Nike Golf
- Spalding (former owner of the Top-Flite, Ben Hogan and Strata brands)

== Apparel manufacturers ==
- Alanic
- Antigua Apparel
- Cutter & Buck
- Galvin Green
- Glenmuir
- Loudmouth Golf
- Nike Golf
- Pringle of Scotland

== See also ==
- List of disc golf brands and manufacturers
