= Forgan =

Forgan may refer to:

== Places ==
- Forgan, Saskatchewan, a hamlet in Saskatchewan, Canada
- Forgan, Oklahoma, a town in Beaver County, Oklahoma, United States
- Forgan (Fife), a parish in Fife, Scotland

== Other uses ==
- Forgan (surname)
- Forgan of St. Andrews, a golf club factory
