= Srixon =

Sports equipment brand

- Product type: Sports equipment
- Current owner: Sumitomo Rubber Industries
- Country: Japan
- Markets: Golf, tennis
- Website: srixon.com

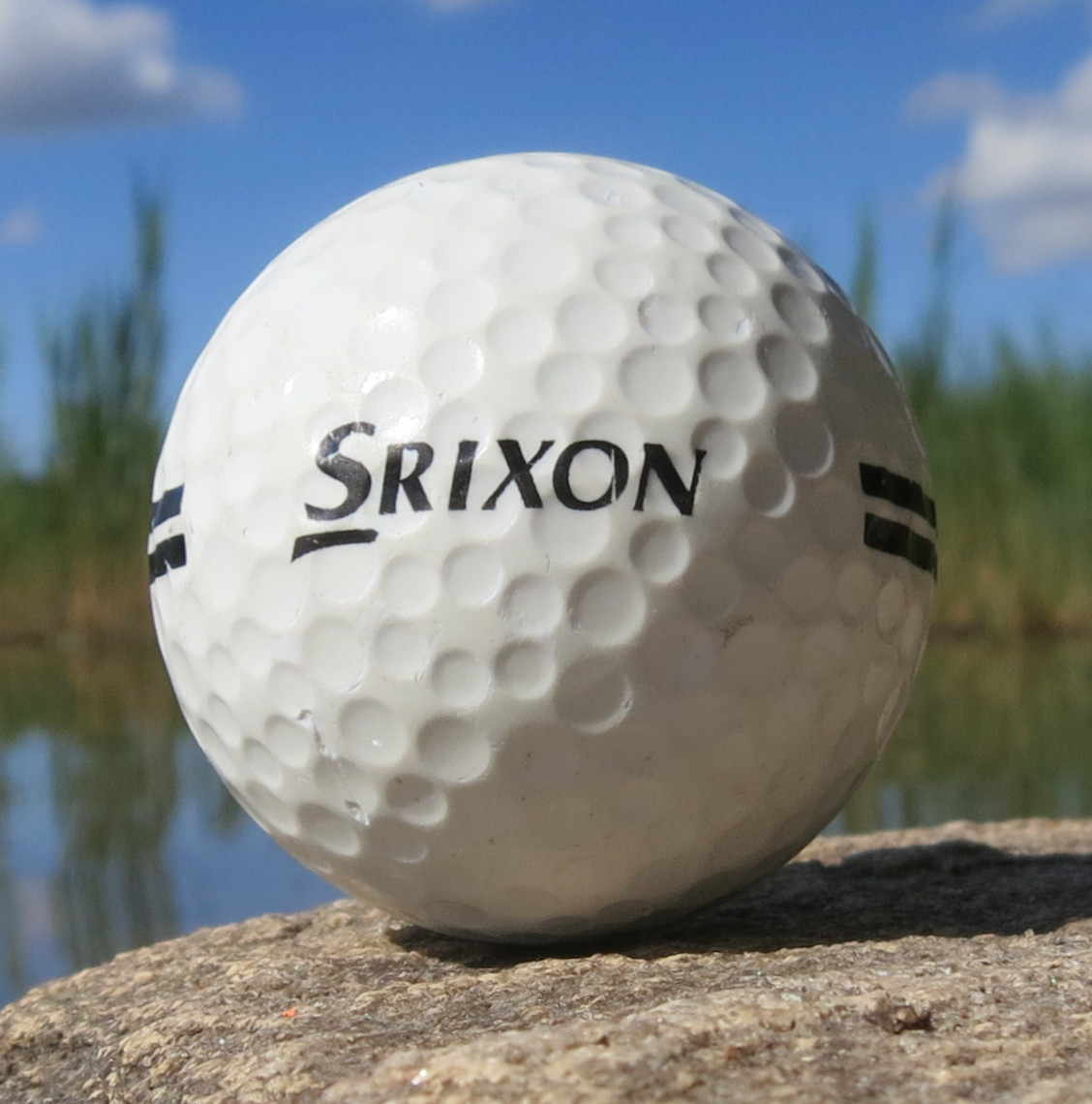
Golf ball by Srixon.

Srixon is a sports equipment brand owned by SRI Sports Limited, a subsidiary of Sumitomo Rubber Industries Ltd., also owner of Dunlop Sport. Srixon focuses on golf, with its balls holding the largest number of patents worldwide, and having previously supplied other leading manufacturers such as Dunlop Slazenger. They also produce a full range of golf clubs and accessories.

In October 2007, SRI Sports acquired Cleveland Golf. On June 27, 2008, SRI announced that operations of the two companies would be consolidated.

== Sponsorship deals ==
Srixon has maintained endorsement deals with many professional golfers on the leading tours, including major champions Keegan Bradley, Ernie Els, Hannah Green, Brooks Koepka, Minjee Lee, Shane Lowry, Hideki Matsuyama, Graeme McDowell, J. J. Spaun, and Inbee Park. They also sponsor Pittsburgh sports broadcaster Bob Pompeani of KDKA-TV.
