= Sumitomo Rubber Industries =

Japanese tire and rubber company

Sumitomo Rubber Industries, Ltd.

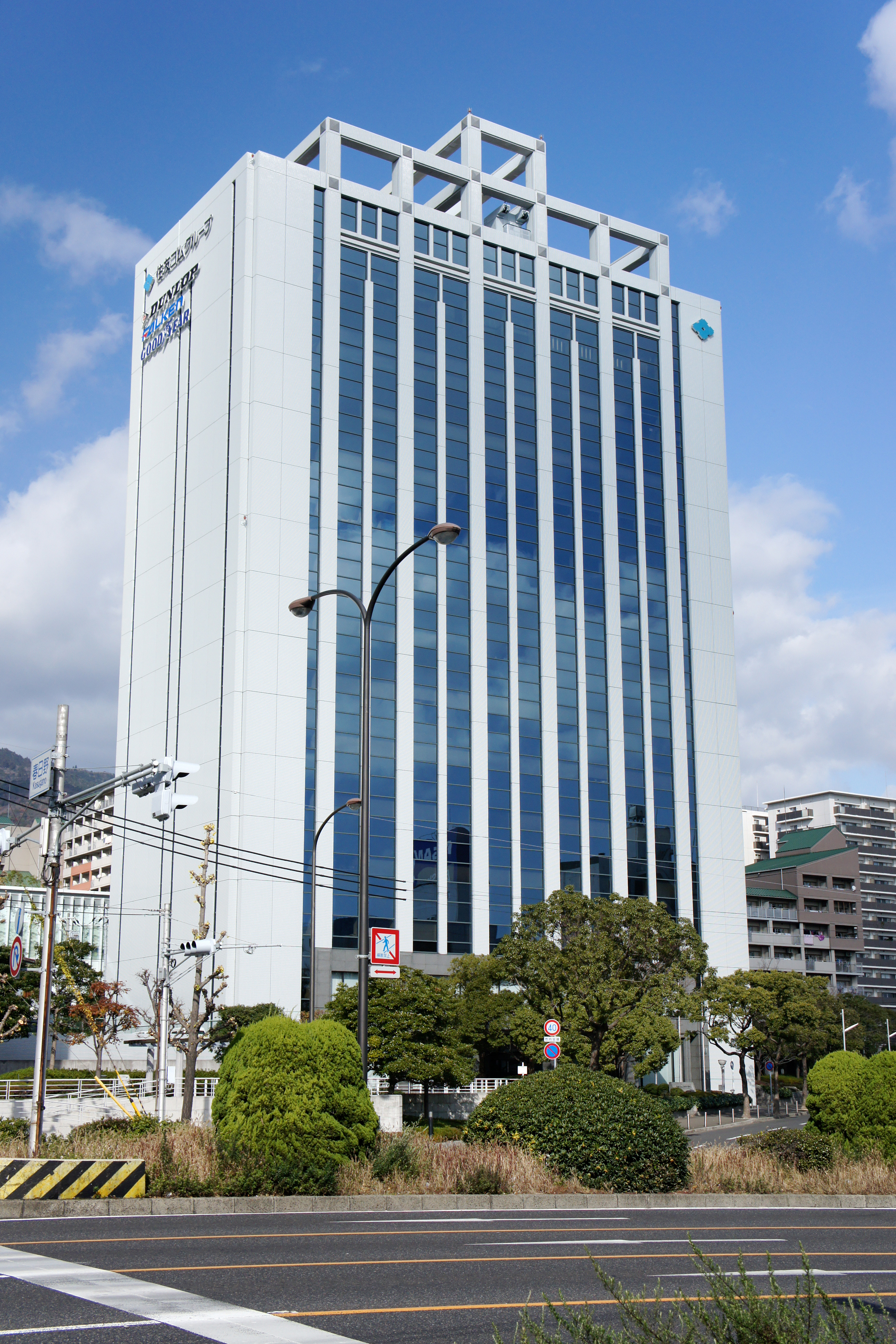
- Corporate headquarters in Kobe, Japan
- Native name: 住友ゴム工業株式会社
- Romanized name: Sumitomo Gomu Kōgyo Kabushiki-gaisha
- Type: Public
- Traded as: TYO: 5110
- Industry: Manufacturing
- Founded: 1909; 117 years ago
- Headquarters: 3-6-9 Wakinohama-cho, Chuo-ku, Kobe, Hyogo 651–0072, Japan
- Key people: Ikuji Ikeda (Chairman); Satoru Yamamoto (President and CEO)
- Products: Tires; Industrial rubber products; Sports equipment
- Brands: List: Tires: Dunlop; Falken; Sports equipment: Cleveland Golf; Dunlop Sport; Srixon; XXIO; Industrial: GRAST; MIRAIE; SeLatex
- Revenue: ▲JPY 877.8 billion (FY 2017) (US$ 7.8 billion) (FY 2017)
- Net income: ▲JPY 46.9 billion (FY 2017) (US$ 419 million) (FY 2017)
- Number of employees: 36,650 (as of March 31, 2018)
- Website: srigroup.co.jp

Sumitomo Rubber Industries, Ltd. (住友ゴム工業株式会社, Sumitomo Gomu Kōgyo Kabushiki-gaisha) is a global tire and rubber company based in Japan. It is part of the Sumitomo Group. The company makes a wide range of rubber based products, including automobile tires, golf balls, and tennis balls. Sumitomo tire brands include Dunlop and Falken. Sumitomo also manufactures and sells sport equipment under the Dunlop Sport, Srixon, and Cleveland Golf brands.

== History ==
Dunlop Far East was founded in 1909 in Kobe, Japan, by the British trading house H. & W. Greer, Ltd. — established in London in 1904 by brothers Harry Greer and William Greer, with a Japanese operation, H. & W. Greer Japan, founded in Kobe in 1906. Greer had already built a factory in Kobe for J. G. Ingram & Son in 1908 which was absorbed into Dunlop Far East from 1911. In 1916, George Millward negotiated to buy out H. & W. Greer's shareholding and took control of the company's management. It was reorganised in March 1917 as a Japanese company with a capital of 1.8 million yen, and in 1918 absorbed the assets of a dissolved Hong Kong–registered predecessor.

From 1958, Dunlop sought a Japanese partner to help fund an expansion of Dunlop Japan's production, and in 1960 gave Sumitomo Electric and Sumitomo Shōji a combined 28.6 per cent stake in the company. Ownership shifted further in 1961 to a 50-50 Anglo-Japanese split, and in October 1963, unable to fund further expansion without ceding majority control, Dunlop transferred management rights to Sumitomo Electric and renamed the company Sumitomo Rubber. Dunlop retained a 44 per cent stake and agreed a new twenty-year technical tie-up.

In 1985, when Dunlop Rubber was taken over by BTR plc, the company acquired the automobile tire assets of Dunlop, including the right to use the Dunlop brand on automobile tires. The acquisition did not include the US and Australian businesses, which were separately owned, but in 1986 Sumitomo also acquired the Dunlop Tire Corporation of the US from its management.

In 1997, Sumitomo formed a joint venture with Goodyear Tire and Rubber Company, by which Goodyear and Sumitomo agreed to manufacture tires for each other's markets, including Dunlop branded tires. As part of the agreement, Goodyear acquired 75% interests in Dunlop Tyres, the UK company which Sumitomo had formed, and in Dunlop Tire Corporation. Goodyear and Sumitomo also made investments in each other.

On 14 February 2014, Goodyear announced its intention to dissolve its partnership with Sumitomo due to alleged "anticompetitive conduct". On June 4, 2015, Goodyear announced the end of its joint venture with SRI, effective end of year 2015. The brand Dunlop will be shared between the 2 companies:

- in North America, Goodyear will control the Dunlop brand for replacement tires and for new cars made by non-Japanese auto makers. Sumitomo Rubber will hold rights to the Dunlop brand for new cars made by Japanese auto makers, as well as for motorcycles;
- in most parts of Europe (including Dunlop's home country Ireland), Goodyear will control the Dunlop brand; and
- in Japan, Sumitomo Rubber will retain rights to the Dunlop brand.

In December 2013 Sumitomo Rubber Industries acquired Apollo Tyres South Africa (Pty) Ltd from Apollo Tyres, which owned the Dunlop tyre brand in South Africa, as part of its strategic global development plans. It subsequently renamed the company Sumitomo Rubber South Africa (Pty) Ltd.

Sumitomo Rubber South Africa manufactures the Dunlop, Sumitomo and Falken passenger car tyre brands in Ladysmith, KwaZulu-Natal.

The Ladysmith plant began to produce Dunlop truck and bus radial tyres in July 2018, following the second of two large investments by Sumitomo Rubber Industries to upgrade and modernise the plant.

Dunlop truck and bus radial tyres produced in Ladysmith will be sold in the South African market and will also be exported to several African states from 2019.

== Falken Tire ==
The Falken Tire brand was launched by Sumitomo in Japan in 1983, and was introduced in North America two years later.

In January 2016, after the dissolution of the partnership with Goodyear, the Sumitomo Rubber USA factory in Tonawanda, New York began to produce Falken Tire-branded tires. The Falken brand is considered a low-price brand tire in the North American market, rated as a Tier 3 tire by those in the industry.

== SRI Sports Limited ==
XXIO Premium three-piece golf ball from circa 2016, a product of the Sumitomo Rubber Industries group.

SRI Sports Limited is the subsidiary of Sumitomo that specializes in sports equipment, with the main focus being tennis and golf. SRI Sports owns Srixon, XXIO, Cleveland Golf, its subsidiary, Never Compromise, as well as rights to the Dunlop name in most parts of the world.

Srixon produces tennis balls, golf balls, golf clubs, and a full range of golfing accessories. It holds several professional golfers under endorsement deals including Hideki Matsuyama, Shane Lowry, Graeme McDowell, Keegan Bradley and Brooks Koepka.

Cleveland Golf also makes a full range of golf equipment, and has endorsement deals with Vijay Singh and Boo Weekley among others.

Following the acquisition of Cleveland Golf, SRI Sports announced their intention to consolidate its operations, with Cleveland overseeing marketing and distribution across North America, with Srixon doing the same in Europe and Australia, and Dunlop taking over in Asia.

In 2018 Dunlop entered into a partnership with Tennis Australia and became the official ball of the Australian Open, in a multi-year deal.
