= International Heritage Inc. =

International Heritage Inc. (IHI) was an American pyramid scheme and MLM company.

The company was founded in 1995 by Stanley H. Van Etten, Larry G. Smith and Claude William Savage, and started with marketing and sales of luxury items, such as jewelry and golf equipment.

In 1996, the company claimed to have sold $47.7 million worth of products through its network of over 75,000 independent sales representatives.

In reality, the products were almost exclusively traded by the company's own distributors, and all income derived from a steady stream of new distributors. In November 1998, the company went bankrupt.

Following the bankruptcy, executives in the company were sentenced to imprisonment for a range of offenses associated with IHI. With more than 140,000 sales representatives, IHI has been described as one of the "hottest MLMs in the mid-90s".
