= Cleveland Golf =

American sporting goods company

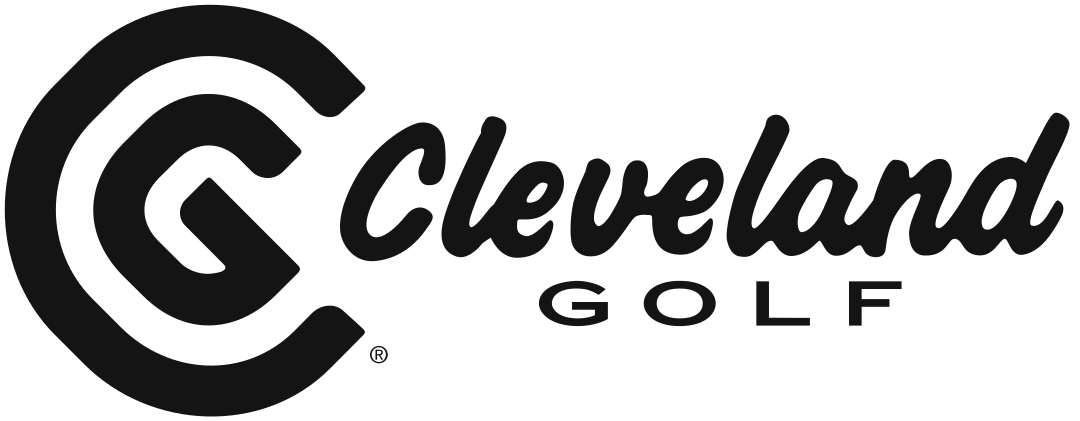
- Type: Subsidiary
- Industry: Sports equipment
- Genre: Golf
- Founded: 1979; 47 years ago
- Founder: Roger Cleveland
- Headquarters: Huntington Beach, California, U.S.
- Products: Golf clubs
- Number of employees: 350+
- Parent: Sumitomo Rubber Industries
- Website: clevelandgolf.com

Cleveland Golf is an American sporting goods manufacturer that specializes in golf equipment. It is owned since 2007 by SRI Sports Limited, a subsidiary of Sumitomo Rubber Industries. The company is headquartered in Huntington Beach, California, and has three international affiliates located in Japan, Europe, and Canada, as well as 26 worldwide distributors.

The company was founded by Roger Cleveland in 1979 as Cleveland Classics, producing replicas of classic golf clubs.

In 1990, ski equipment manufacturer Skis Rossignol purchased the company, and the name was changed to Cleveland Golf. It grew with the sales of clubs such as VAS woods and irons. Later in the decade, Tour Action irons and QuadPro woods were introduced with "more classic designs."

Quiksilver, Inc. purchased the assets of Rossignol in 2005 and operated Cleveland Golf until December 2007. At that point, Dunlop Sport purchased Cleveland Golf. Dunlop Sports Co. Ltd. owns and operates several brands in North America.

In 2026, Roger Cleveland returned to Cleveland Golf to design a line of wedge clubs based on the fifth generation wedges the company released in 1988.
