= Penfold Golf =

British manufacturer of golf equipment

- Industry: Sports equipment
- Founded: 1927; 99 years ago
- Founder: Albert Penfold
- Headquarters: UK
- Website: penfoldgolfusa.com

1990s golf ball manufactured in England by Penfold Golf.

Penfold Golf Ltd. is a British sporting goods manufacturer of golf equipment founded in 1929 by Albert Ernest Penfold (1884–1941). Golf equipment include balls, tees, gloves, apart from fashion accessories such as hats and wallets.

"Early recognition of Penfold's ability came when the solid guttie ball was standard. The gutta then used for balls was often dirty gray, full of foreign particles and none too easy to find on the imperfect fairways of that day. Then, when a leading authority made the statement in his presence that white gutta-percha would make a fortune for the inventor, Penfold spent an intensive period in the laboratory. A pure white gutta-percha was his initial contribution to golf."

The Royal and Ancient had a ball made which they believed would set a limit to the distance potentialities of all golf balls. Penfold and other ball manufacturers were called in and shown the specifications of the new ball which was supposed to be the perfect 'restrictor.' During the inspection Penfold startled the assembly making the quiet statement that he could build a ball to those very specifications that would out drive any ball then made.

"The first test of the Penfold production was held on a Sunday prior to a British Open Championship on a course near St. Andrews. When the selected Driver hit the first Penfold designed ball it carried far beyond the furthermost markers. Other Penfold balls gave identical results. Examination followed the demonstration, and the Penfold test ball was found to conform to the letter of the restricting specification."

A.E. Penfold began his career with the Silvertown company where he was involved in golf ball development. In 1919 he joined Dunlop and designed the famous “Maxfli” ball. Penfold left Dunlop in 1927 to form his own company, Golf Ball Developments Ltd, based at Bromford Lane, Ward End, Birmingham.

In the early 1930s, Penfold launched his "Latticed" ball which was an instant success at home and in export markets.

Penfold devised a winding technique which permitted extreme tension of the rubber thread and unerring accuracy. The trick in winding was to prevent too many loops of the rubber thread crossing at exactly the same point.

On 17 February 1941 A.E. Penfold was lost at sea aboard the Prince Line cargo ship Siamese Prince, which was torpedoed by the German submarine U-69 off the coast of Ireland.

The company continued manufacturing golf balls at Bromford Lane up until the late 1990s, and the brand was featured in Ian Fleming's James Bond story and film Goldfinger.

Nothing remains of the Bromford Lane factory which was sold for redevelopment. Penfold Golf Ltd, continues to market and distribute Penfold branded golf balls, gloves and clothing from its head office in Dudley.
