= Hwa Fong Industrial Park =

- Interactive map of the Hwa Fong Industrial Park area
- Former names: Dunlop America Factory

General information
- Status: Completed
- Type: Industrial
- Architectural style: Brick Factory
- Location: 10 Sheridan Drive Tonawanda, New York 14150, United States
- Coordinates: 42.9701°N 78.916779°W
- Construction started: 1920
- Completed: 1923
- Cost: 20 Million US$($3.21 billion in 2025 dollars)

Design and construction
- Architect: Foundation Company
- Developer: Foundation Company
- Main contractor: Mechanical Handling Systems, inc. (MHS)

The Hwa Fong Industrial Park is a manufacturing and industrial complex in Tonawanda, New York. The industrial park is located approximately one mile from the Buffalo city line. The facility is located adjacent to 3M Tonawanda and across the street from DuPont YERKES and GM Tonawanda Propulsion.

== History ==
The functional brick style Factory was built between 1920-1923 to serve as a manufacturing subsidiary in the U.S. for Dunlop Rubber which already had seven other tire and rubber plants manufacturing pneumatic tires in Europe and Asia at the time.

The factory has gone through several large expansions and renovations over the years. Notable expansion and new building additions took place in 1927, 1957, 1969, 1984, 1990, 1998, and 2020.

== Site and buildings ==
In 1920, ground was broken on a 214-acre plot for 23 total buildings, ten of which were to be dedicated manufacturing buildings. The site location was selected based on ample frontage on the Niagara River. This direct water access provided a means of convenient transportation and an endless supply of clean water chemically suitable for the rubber industry. The location was also in close proximity to large hydro-electric power producing plants of Niagara Falls. The factory was designed by the Foundation Company and built by Mechanical Handling Systems of Detroit, MI.

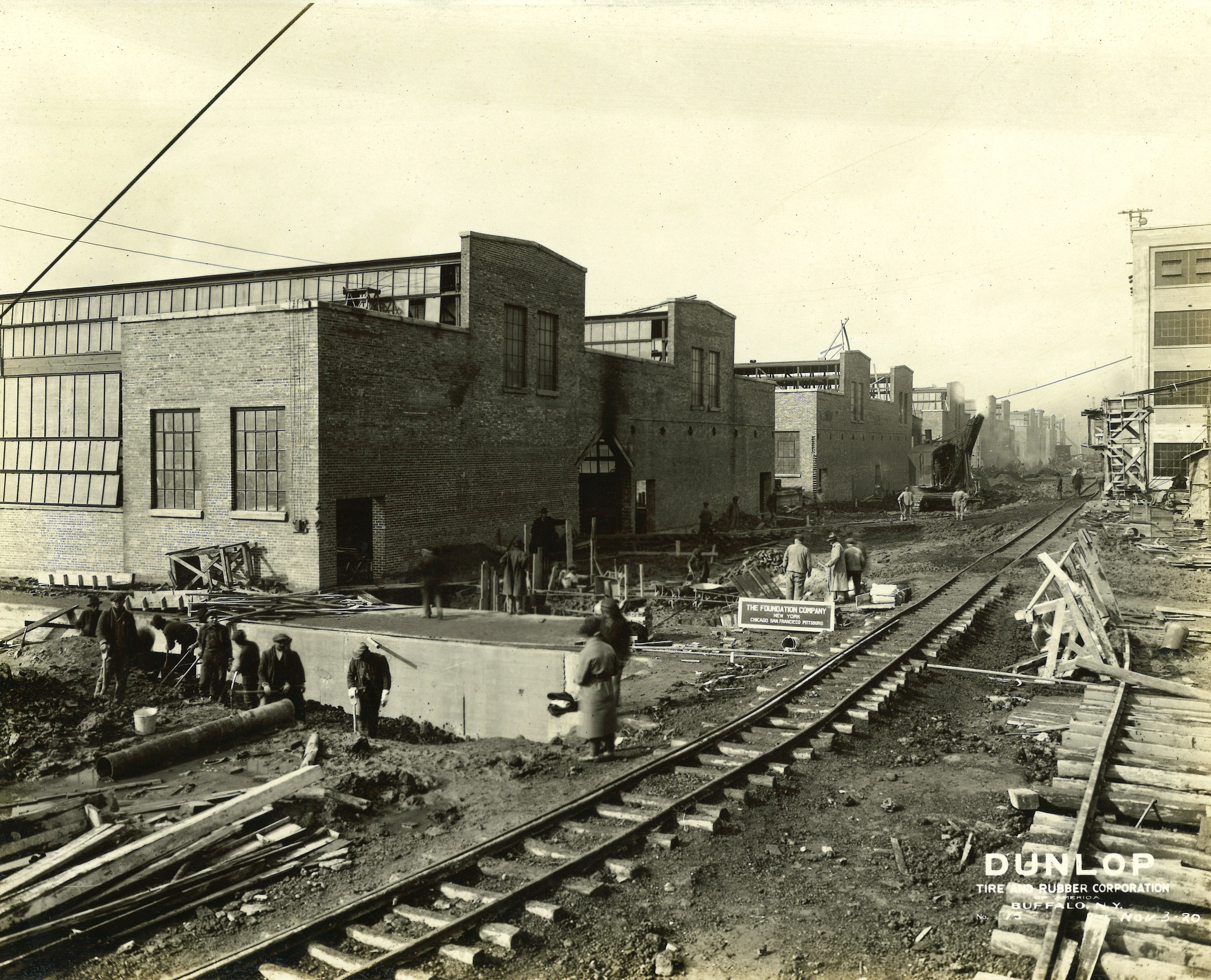
Construction, East Alleyway Nov.1920

== Timeline ==
1920
The Dunlop America Factory construction begins. The factory is designed to occupy 1,430,000 sqft of production space, spanning nearly 40 acres of built-on land and an initial property holding of 214 acres. The plant was built with a capacity of up to 13,000 tires per day when operating full.
1923
The factory begins operations with the first Dunlop brand U.S. made tire leaving the production line of the Tonawanda factory. Initial factory production focused on Solid tires, Pneumatic tires, Tubes, as well as an entire building devoted to Motorcycle tires (bld 13) and tires for Ford (bld 11).

To help serve the U.S. factory, Dunlop purchases and operates a fabric Spinning Mill factory in Utica, New York. The mill, which was originally constructed in the 1880s, had produced cotton knit underwear and was retooled for the production of cotton tire fabrics.

1928
Dunlop begins manufacturing golf balls in the factory dedicating 40,000 sqft of factory space. The golf balls retail for $0.75/ea for the "Dunlop Maxpar" and $0.50/ea for the "Dunlop Warwick". For comparison, the imported balls from England (Dunlop Maxflies) had previously retailed for $1/ea US$($19.00 in 2025 dollars)
1943
The factory produced tires, tubes, and boat rubber for the U.S. government war effort. United States Navy K-class blimp parts were also produced by the U.S. Dunlop factory under sub-contract by the Goodyear Company. The airship parts production lasted until 1945.
Post WWII
The factory is devoted to the manufacture of tires and tubes for trucks, busses, passenger cars, farm and tractor tires, Pillo-Foam cushioning (Dunlopillo), and Dunlop brand Golf and Tennis balls.
1954
A portion of south facing property is used by New York State for a new section of highway Interstate 190 (New York).
1969
Dunlop opens a second U.S.-based factory in Huntsville, AL.
Early 1970s
The Tonawanda Factory begins production of Motorcycle tires.
1981
Dunlop Motorcycle tires are awarded the OEM business of Harley-Davidson a partnership that would go on to last over 40 years.
1984
Dunlop Tire Corp is sold to BTR plc a group consisting of British and U.S. investors.
1985
Sumitomo Rubber Industries buys out the majority of Dunlop Tire Corporation (DTC) stock.
1986
Dunlop closes the fabric mill in Utica NY. The building is later acquired and reopened as Utica Converters, Inc.
1997
Goodyear Tire & Rubber obtained a seventy-five percent controlling interest in Dunlop.
1999
Sumitomo Rubber Industries acquires the rights to Dunlop tire brand in much of the world including North America, Europe, and Japan.
2003
Goodyear discontinues tire manufacturing operations at the Huntsville, AL plant (a previous Dunlop Factory). An office and test track (Proving Grounds) are retained.
2023
Dunlop Buffalo celebrates 100 years of tire manufacturing within the factory.
Nov.2024
Sumitomo Rubber USA discontinues tire manufacturing operations at the Tonawanda plant.
April.2026
Hwa Fong Rubber purchases the factory and converts the campus into an Industrial Park.

== Factory 0wners and operators ==
- Dunlop Rubber operates the factory from 1923 until the Mid-1980’s.
- Goodyear Tire and Rubber Company and Sumitomo Rubber Industries operate the factory under a joint venture in the 1980 through 1990s.
- Goodyear Tire & Rubber obtains a seventy-five percent controlling interest in Dunlop in 1997. The Factory would operate under the Goodyear name until 2015.
- From 1999-2015: Goodyear Tire and Rubber and Sumitomo Rubber operate the factory again under a joint venture.
- From 2015–2024: Sumitomo Rubber USA serves as the sole operator of the factory. Sumitomo Rubber continued to produce Motorcycle tires under the Dunlop brand as well as passenger car and truck and bus tires under the Falken brand.
- 2026-Current: A subsidiary of Hwa Fong operates the factory which was repurposed to an industrial park.

== Gallery ==
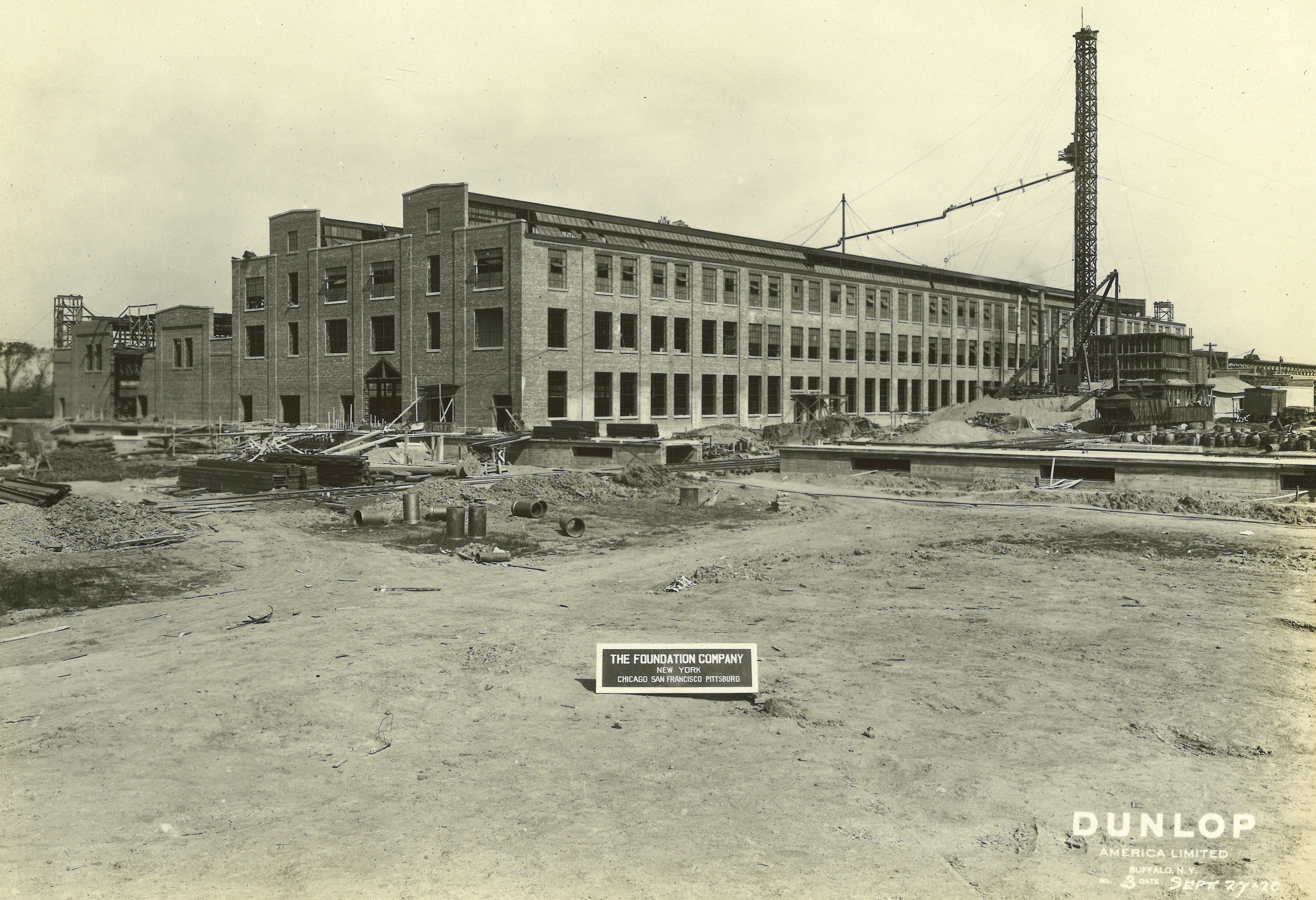
Building 1 Construction looking East Sept.1920

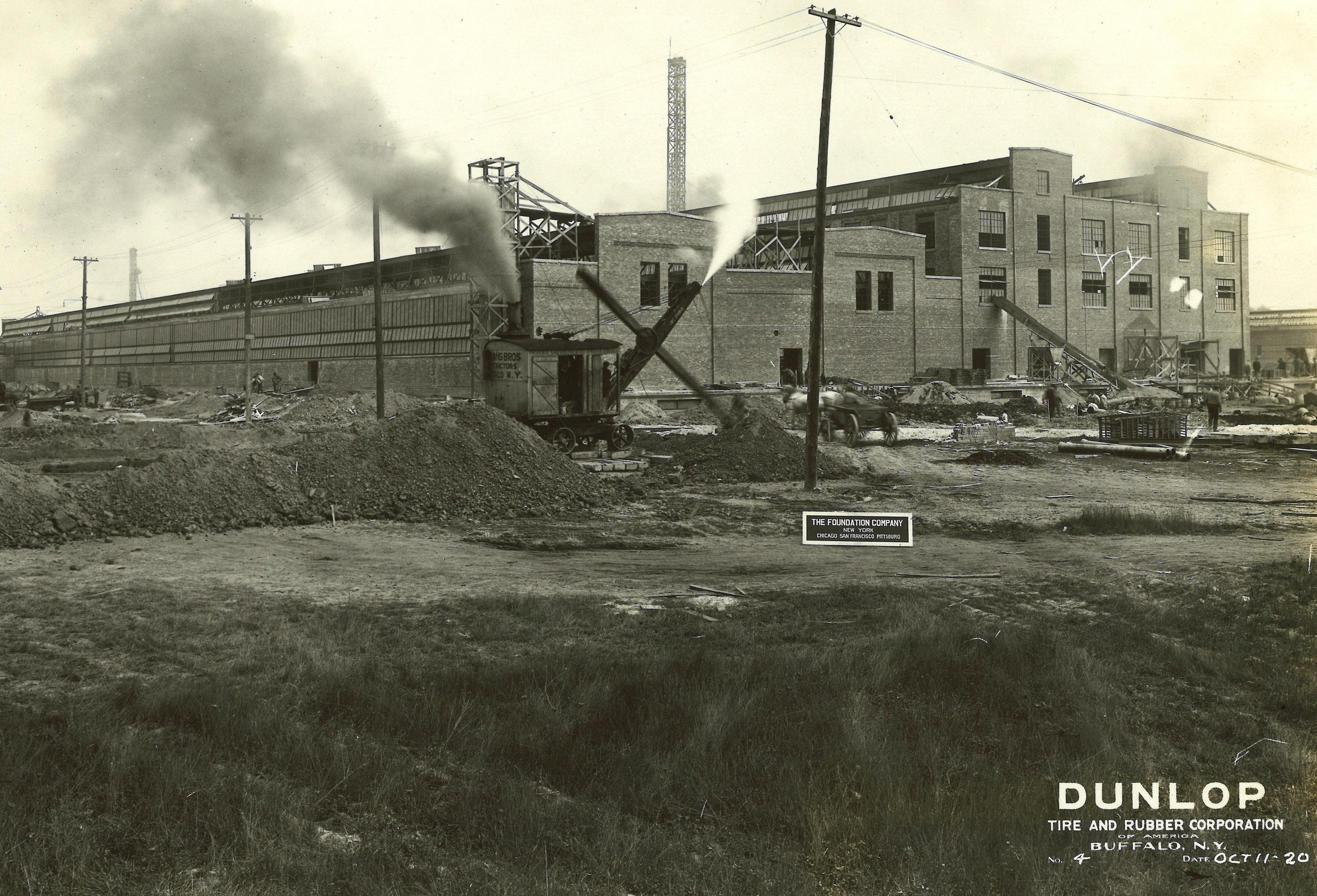
Building 1 Construction looking South East Oct.1920

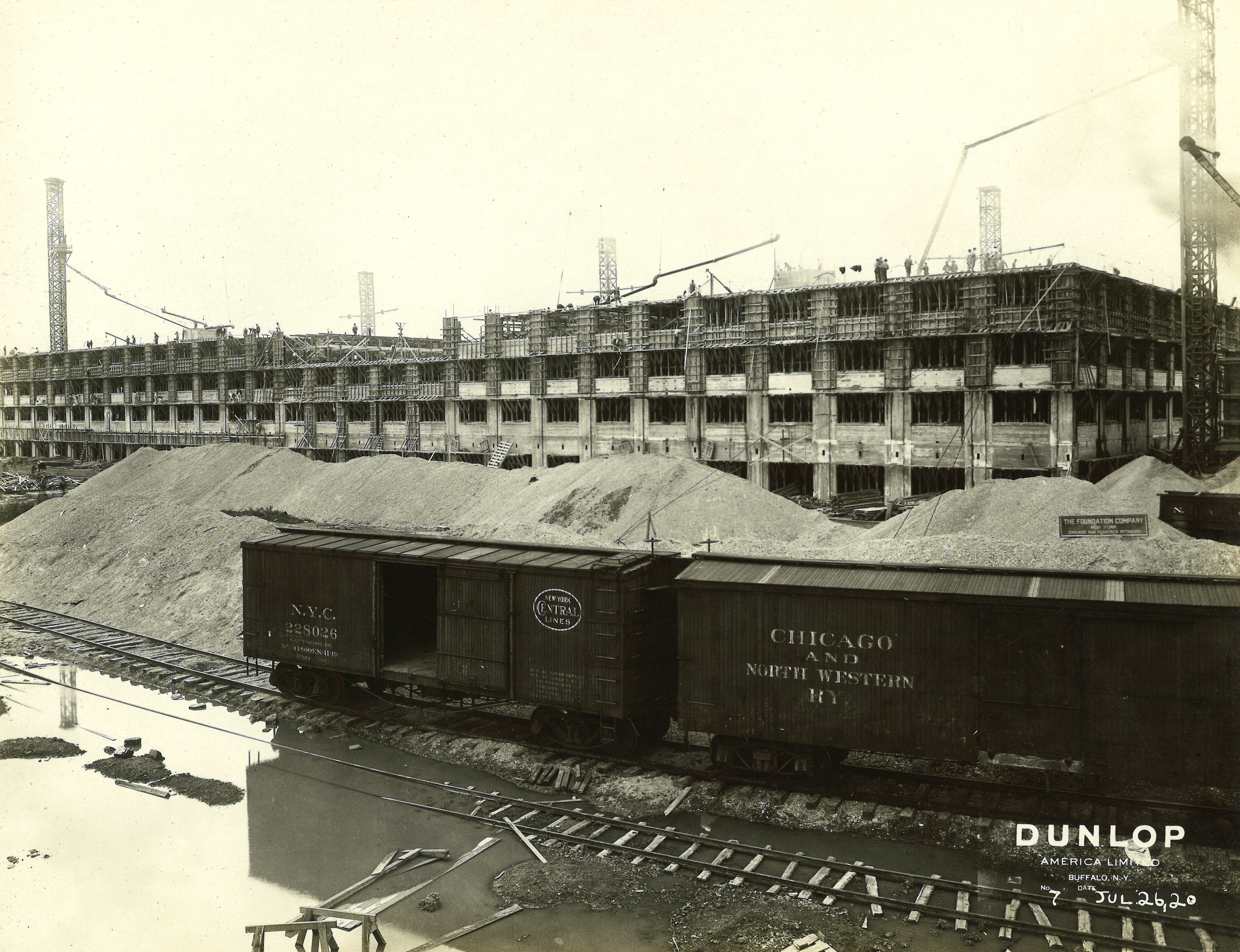
Building 16 Warehouse Construction July.1920

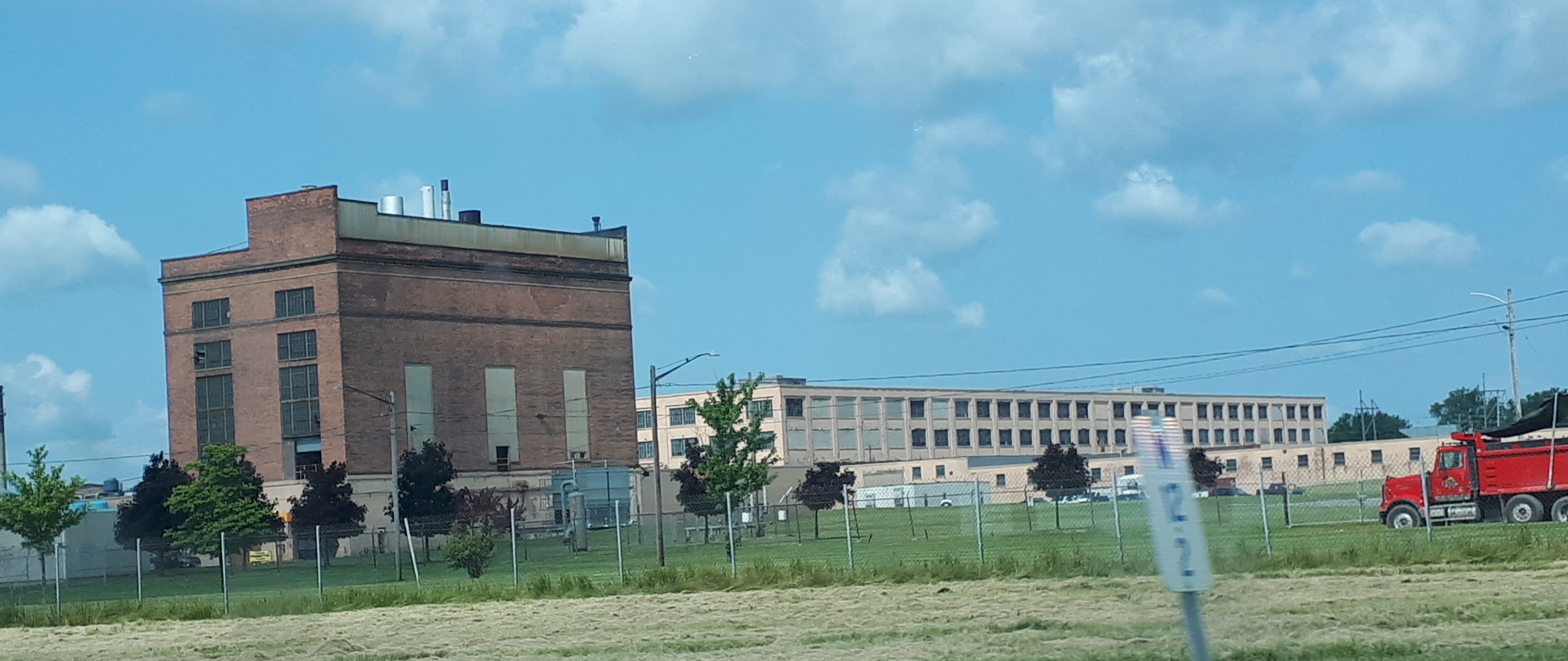
Building 22 Boilerhouse looking north
