= Precision Golf Forging =

Golf equipment brand

- Company type: Private
- Industry: Sports equipment
- Founded: 1932; 93 years ago
- Founder: East Brothers
- Headquarters: Australia
- Area served: Worldwide
- Products: Golf equipment
- Parent: Walkinshaw Sports
- Website: www.wsports.com.au/

Precision Golf Forging (PGF) is an Australian golf equipment brand. Notable players to have used PGF equipment include Peter Thomson, Kel Nagle and Greg Norman.

== History ==
East Brothers was founded in Sydney in 1932. During the 1950s, the company merged with Chesterfield to form Precision Golf Forging.

PGF incorporated Keith Knox (another Australian golf equipment brand) in 1976

PGF was owned by Colgate-Palmolive from 1974 until 1978, when it was purchased by Kerry Stokes. In 1984, he sold a 50% stake to Harrisons and Crosfield. The company was later sold to Haw Par. In 2001, Haw Par sold the PGF companies to Precision Golf Forging Limited. In 2011, rights to the brand were acquired by Walkinshaw Sports.
