= Forgan of St Andrews =

Scottish golf club manufacturing company

- Industry: Sports equipment
- Founded: 1860; 166 years ago
- Founder: Robert Forgan
- Key people: Hugh Philp (club maker)
- Products: Golf clubs. golf bags
- Website: forgan.co.uk

Forgan of St Andrews is a British manufacturing company of golf equipment, founded in St Andrews, Fife, Scotland. Having been established in 1860, Forgan is the oldest golf club manufacturing company in the world. Apart from golf clubs, Forgan commercialises bags and clothing, such as t-shirts, hats and jackets.

In past years, Forgan was a subsidiary of American corporation Spalding in the 1940s, and then of Sports PLC, a European online retailer.

== History ==
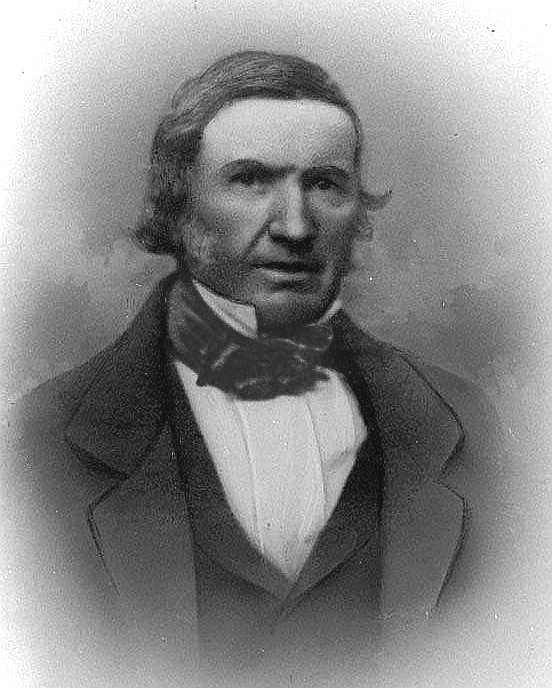
Hugh Philp hired his nephew, Robert Forgan, in 1852 as an assistant. Forgan took over the firm upon Philp's death in 1856.

The company owes its foundation to the Society of St Andrews Golfers, later The Royal and Ancient Golf Club of St Andrews, who hired local carpenter Hugh Philp to make golf clubs.

Philp used thorn, apple and pear woods as materials for its clubs, which were highly appreciated as craft items and gained him widespread recognition.

It was Hugh Philp who first departed from the primitive models of the stone age and began to make golf clubs that looked as though they were intended for some gentler work (...) Philp had an eye for graceful lines and curves, and his slim, elegant models remain today things of beauty (...) Philp was the only man who ever knew how to make a perfectly balanced wooden putter.

— Harper's Weekly, 2 Oct. 1897

This genius made such beautiful and perfect wooden putters that he has come to be regarded as the Amati or Stradivarius of Golf, and a genuine "Philp" today is worth untold gold. The long narrow faces of these clubs and their perfect balance are well known to connoisseurs

— Golf Illustrated magazine, 5 Oct. 1900

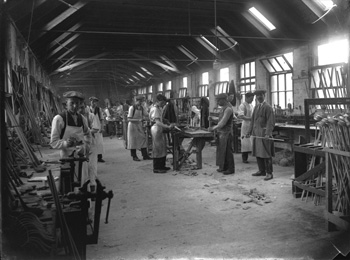
The Forgan Club Works, c. 1880. Pictured are Robert Forgan with son

After Philp's death in 1856, he was succeeded by his nephew Robert Forgan, who established "Forgan Golf" four years later. The increasing demand for products caused Forgan to hire caddie and golfer Jamie Anderson as his apprentice. Anderson went on to win the Open tournament three times, nevertheless, his work at the factory would not be interrupted. Forgan was later appointed official club maker to the Prince of Wales.

By those times, facilities had been relocated from Philp's original workshop to a fisherman's house, where the company set up during decades. Machinery brought saws an lathes to the production process enabling mass manufacturing. As Robert Forgan died in 1900, the company was passed to his son Thomas, who remained until his premature death in 1906, causing the company passed into the hands of his two sons, Lawrence and Robert. During their administration of the familiar business, Forgan hired agents to take orders from any country.

During the World War II, American clubs flooded the market in the UK, causing a strong decrease of sales, which led American company Spalding to take over Forgan. Production resumed briefly in 1945. Nevertheless, in 1963 Spalding concentrated its production in Belfast, and the fisherman's factory fell into disuse.

In 2008, Sports PLC, the European division for California-based "Confidence Sporting Goods, Inc.", acquired Forgan of St Andrews. Forgan Golf is now owned by Sports PLC.

== Sponsorships ==
Forgan Golf has endorsement deals with 1991 Masters champion Ian Woosnam, and European Seniors Tour player David J. Russell.
