= Buggies Unlimited =

American golf cart parts and accessories distributor

- Type: Private
- Industry: Golf cart parts and accessories distribution
- Founded: 1997
- Founder: Bart Mahan
- Headquarters: Jacksonville, Florida, United States
- Key people: Bart Mahan (CEO)
- Products: Golf cart parts and accessories
- Parent: Nivel Parts & Manufacturing Co. (acquired 2008)

Buggies Unlimited is a distributor of golf cart parts and accessories headquartered in Jacksonville, Florida. The company sells to its customers via its website and catalog mailings.

== History ==
Buggies Unlimited was founded in 1997. CEO Bart Mahan started the company as a golf cart dealership, opening a small showroom in Lexington, Kentucky and creating a basic informational website. Buggies Unlimited expanded in 1999 by adding another location in Beckley, West Virginia.

In 2000 and 2001, the company experienced tough times as the economy struggled through the dot-com crash and the September 11 attacks. In order to keep the business running, Mahan closed the West Virginia location and scaled back his employees from 16 to 5.

In 2002, the company switched focus from a traditional golf cart dealership to a supplier of golf cart parts and accessories. The shift to a niche market worked, and after launching a catalog and e-commerce website to sell its products, Buggies Unlimited grew and relocated to larger warehouses twice before settling on its current 108,000-square-foot (10,000 m^{2}) location in Richmond, Kentucky. Due to a rapid increase in demand in recent years, a retail showroom and golf cart service center was opened in 2007 in Winchester, Kentucky.

In 2008, the company was bought by Nivel Parts & Manufacturing Co.

== Buggy Bonanza ==
Buggies Unlimited sponsors the Buggy Bonanza, a golf cart show and rally held in Central Kentucky. The Bonanza brings golf cart enthusiasts from across the country together to participate in events such as the mud pit, hill climb, off-road race, and tug-of-war. In addition, many owners bring their customized carts to be judged on appearance, similar to a car show. Individual awards are given out at the end of the event.

In 2005 and 2006, the Bonanza was held in Richmond, Kentucky, the latter year bringing in 200 people and 70 golf carts from around the country to compete. The 2008, the event was scheduled to be held at the London Dragstrip in London, Kentucky, on July 25–26, 2008.

== Awards & Nominations ==
Buggies Unlimited has been recognized for accomplishments in the business world. In 2005, the company won Small Business of the Year from the Lexington Chamber of Commerce. In 2006, Buggies Unlimited was voted one of Kentucky's Best Places to Work and was a finalist for the US Chamber of Commerce's Small Business of the Year. In 2007 and 2008, the company catalog was chosen as a finalist at the Multichannel Merchant Awards.
