= Lamkin Grips =

Lamkin Golf Grips was founded in Chicago, Illinois by Elver B. Lamkin in 1925. Lamkin Golf Grips is currently run by the third generation of Lamkins, Robert J. Lamkin, who became the president and CEO in 2001. They also sponsor the Lamkin Grips San Diego Classic which has hosted by San Diego State each March since 2007. Lamkin has ambassadors in Keegan Bradley and Brendan Steele.

In 2004, Lamkin announced plans to raise $1m to help fund the battle against Prostate cancer, as a sponsor of the Prostate Cancer Foundation. As of 2008, they had raised more than $400,000 for this cause.

In 2024 Lamkin was acquired by SuperStroke.
