= PowaKaddy =

PowaKaddy International Limited
- Type: Limited company
- Industry: Golf equipment
- Founded: 1983
- Founder: Joe Catford
- Headquarters: Sittingbourne, Kent, UK
- Products: Electric golf trolleys, golf trolleys, golf bags
- Website: PowaKaddy.co.uk

PowaKaddy or PowaKaddy International Limited is a golf equipment manufacturing company based in Sittingbourne, Kent, United Kingdom, that specialises in electric golf trolleys.

PowaKaddy's main business is electric golf trolleys but it also produces a range of manual push or pull trolleys, golf bags and other accessories. The original PowaKaddy Classic, as it was called, was invented in 1983 by Joe Catford, who along with John Martin launched the product from a small factory in Sittingbourne.

== History ==
In 1983, Joe Catford, along with John Martin launched the PowaKaddy Classic from a small factory in Sittingbourne. The company has changed hands several times in its history. Catford sold the company to the now dissolved company, Sunleigh plc in 1989. Around ten years later, PowaKaddy changed hands following a management buyout by John DeGraft-Johnson, David Wells and Mike Snapes along with Close Brothers Private Equity. In 2004, Fergus O'Rafferty and Rossa McDermot, backed by Graphite Capital, bought PowaKaddy. After a difficult two and a half years caused by the failing P5 product, Powakaddy went into administration in November 2006, since when it has been run by Barclays Ventures after which, most sourcing was made from the Far East. Following the problems with P5 the group launched the Freeway II was launched. This new and innovative product had push button controls but was dogged with quality issues and was discontinued at the end of 2010 and replaced with the Freeway Sport.

In August 2012 former owner John DeGraft-Johnson and the son of the inventor Joe Catford, David Catford, bought PowaKaddy out of administration. Despite the issues in the field PowaKaddy still enjoys the number one brand leading position.

As of March 2020, the brand launched its new lines of Freeway (FX) & Compact (CT) to modernise the trolley line. These trolleys include features like GPS, remote control, EBS and LCD control displays.
