= Hugh Philp =

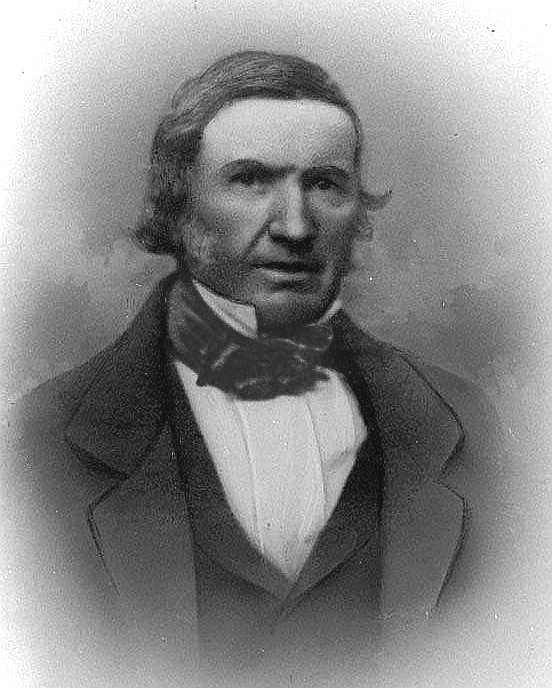
- Born: 1786; Cameron Bridge, Fife, Scotland
- Died: 1856 (aged 69–70); St Andrews, Fife, Scotland
- Occupation: Golf club maker

Hugh Philp (1786–1856) was a Scottish golf club maker, who is considered to be the greatest club maker of all time.

Born in Cameron Bridge in Fife he moved to nearby St Andrews to establish a carpentry, joinery and housepainting business. In 1812 he started to repair and then make golf clubs as a sideline. This sideline became a great success and he subsequently opened a shop and workshop adjacent to the St Andrews Links.

Philp used thorn, apple and pear woods as materials for its clubheads. He was recognized as the finest clubmaker of his time. So well regarded were his clubs that even while he lived, forgeries were made after a couple of his name stamps had been stolen. Even to this day, fake clubs bearing an H. PHILP name stamp confound collectors.

His clubs were in great demand by the leading players of the day and in 1819 Philp was appointed as club-maker to the Society of Golfers at St. Andrews (later to become The Royal and Ancient Golf Club of St Andrews).

Philp's first assistant was James Wilson, who worked with him for 23 years prior to his departure in 1852. By this time, Philp was chronically ill and did not see much shop time. He hired his son-in-law, Robert Forgan, in 1852 who he helped train as a clubmaker. When Philp died in 1856, Forgan took over the business. But Philp's widow had to sell the premises of the shop. So, shortly after Philp's death, Forgan purchased the buildings just to the east of Philp's shop and moved his clubmaking business there.

After the sale of the building, it was occupied by a ball and clubmaker from England named George Daniel Brown from 1861 to 1866. Extensive renovations were done adding another floor. In 1866, Old Tom Morris purchased the building and it has remained in the Morris family ever since.

Today, Philp’s clubs are highly sought after by collectors, with auction prices reaching several thousand pounds.

== Recognition ==
It was Hugh Philp who first departed from the primitive models of the stone age and began to make golf clubs that looked as though they were intended for some gentler work (...) Philp had an eye for graceful lines and curves, and his slim, elegant models remain today things of beauty (...) Philp was the only man who ever knew how to make a perfectly balanced wooden putter.

— Harper's Weekly, 2 Oct. 1897

This genius made such beautiful and perfect wooden putters that he has come to be regarded as the Amati or Stradivarius of Golf, and a genuine "Philp" today is worth untold gold. The long narrow faces of these clubs and their perfect balance are well known to connoisseurs

— Golf Illustrated magazine, 5 Oct. 1900
