= Forgan (surname) =

Forgan is a surname of Scottish origin. It comes from Forgan in Fife.

Notable people with the surname include:

- Chevonne Forgan (born 2000), American luger
- Liz Forgan (born 1944), English journalist and radio & TV executive
- Robert Forgan (1891–1976), British politician
- Tommy Forgan (1929–2019), English football goalkeeper
- William Forgan Smith (1887–1953), premier of Queensland, Australia
