= Dunlop Sport =

Sports equipment manufacturer

- Type: Subsidiary
- Industry: Sports equipment, textile, footwear
- Founded: 1910; 116 years ago
- Headquarters: Leatherhead, England
- Area served: Worldwide
- Products: Rackets, strings, balls, shuttlecock, sportswear, sneakers, accessories
- Revenue: approx. $650 million
- Parent: SRI Sports
- Website: dunlopsports.com

Dunlop Sport is a British sports equipment manufacturing company established in 1910 that focuses on racquets and water sports, more specifically tennis, swimming, squash, padel and badminton. Dunlop Sport products include racquets, strings, balls, shuttlecocks, and bags. Sportswear and clothing line includes t-shirts, shorts, skirts, jackets, pants, socks, caps, sneakers, and wristbands.

Dunlop Sport is operated by SRI Sports, a subsidiary of Japanese conglomerate Sumitomo Rubber Industries, which acquired the Dunlop brand in 2017.

In the past, Dunlop also manufactured golf equipment.

== History ==
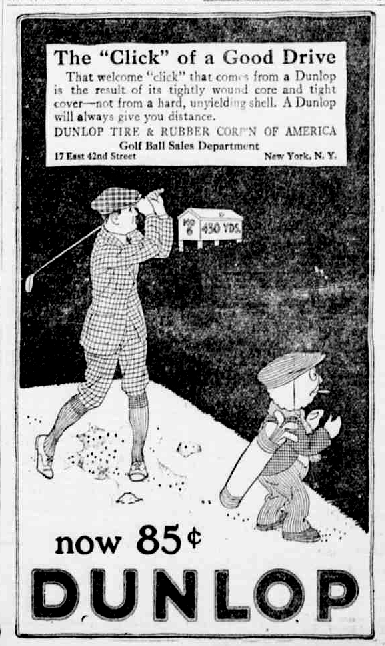
Dunlop advertisement for its golf balls, 1922

Dunlop was established as a company manufacturing goods from rubber in 1889. The company entered the sporting goods market in 1910, when it began to manufacture rubber golf balls at its base in Birmingham. The company introduced the Maxfli golf ball in 1922.

Dunlop extended into tennis ball manufacture in 1924. In 1925, F A Davis was acquired, which had tennis racket manufacturing expertise. Dunlop opened acquisition discussions with Slazenger in 1927, but without success. In 1928, the sports division became a subsidiary of Dunlop Rubber named Dunlop Sports. Headquarters were relocated from Birmingham to Waltham Abbey in Essex.

The Dunlop Masters golf tournament was established in 1946. It was sponsored by Dunlop until 1982, and is now known as the British Masters.

In 1957, Dunlop acquired the golf club manufacturer John Letters of Scotland. In 1959 the Slazenger Group was acquired. The Dunlop "flying D" logo was introduced in 1960.

In the 1970s and 1980s, Dunlop was slow to adapt to the new materials that tennis rackets were increasingly being made from, believing that wood would remain the dominant material.

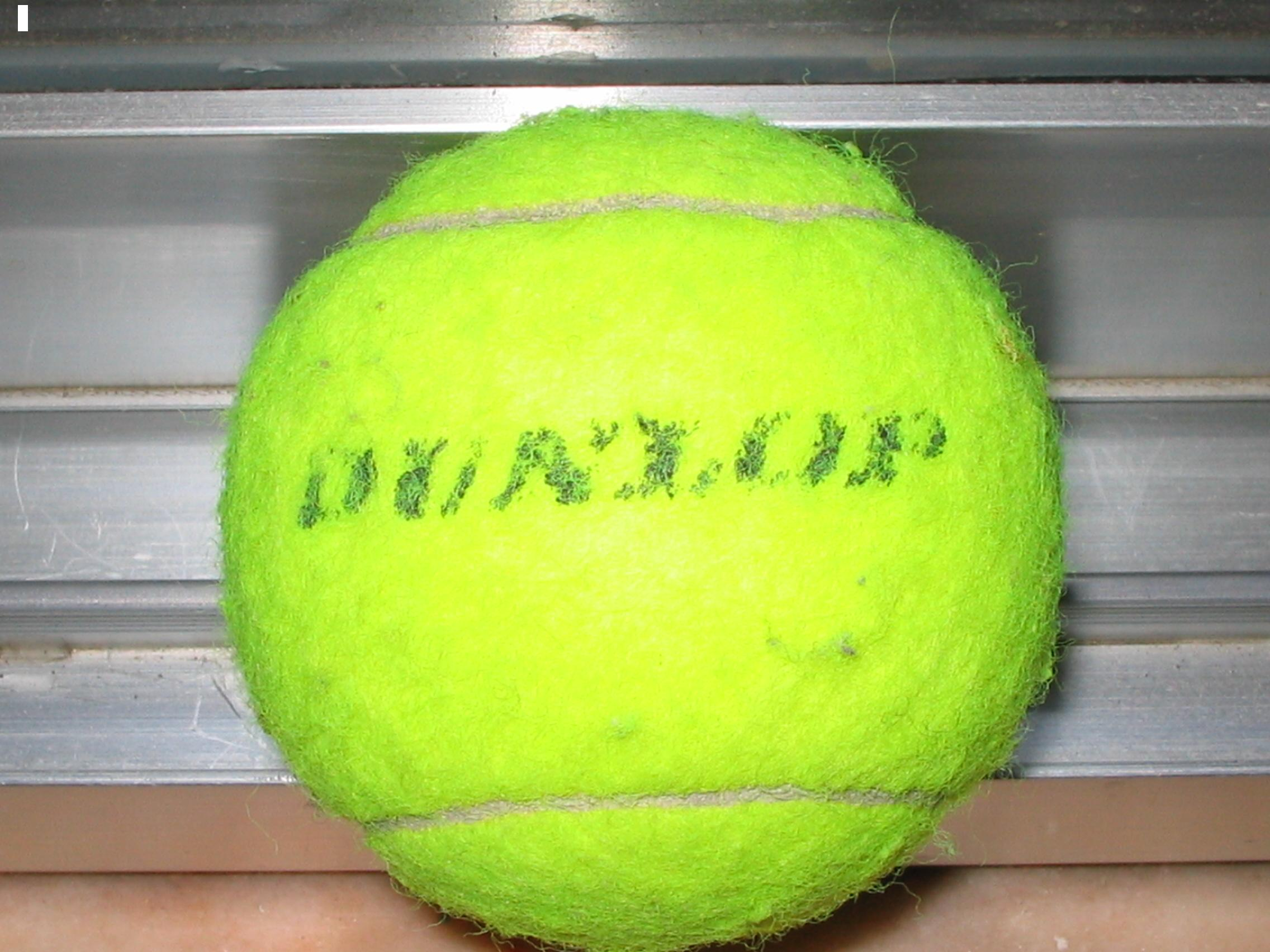
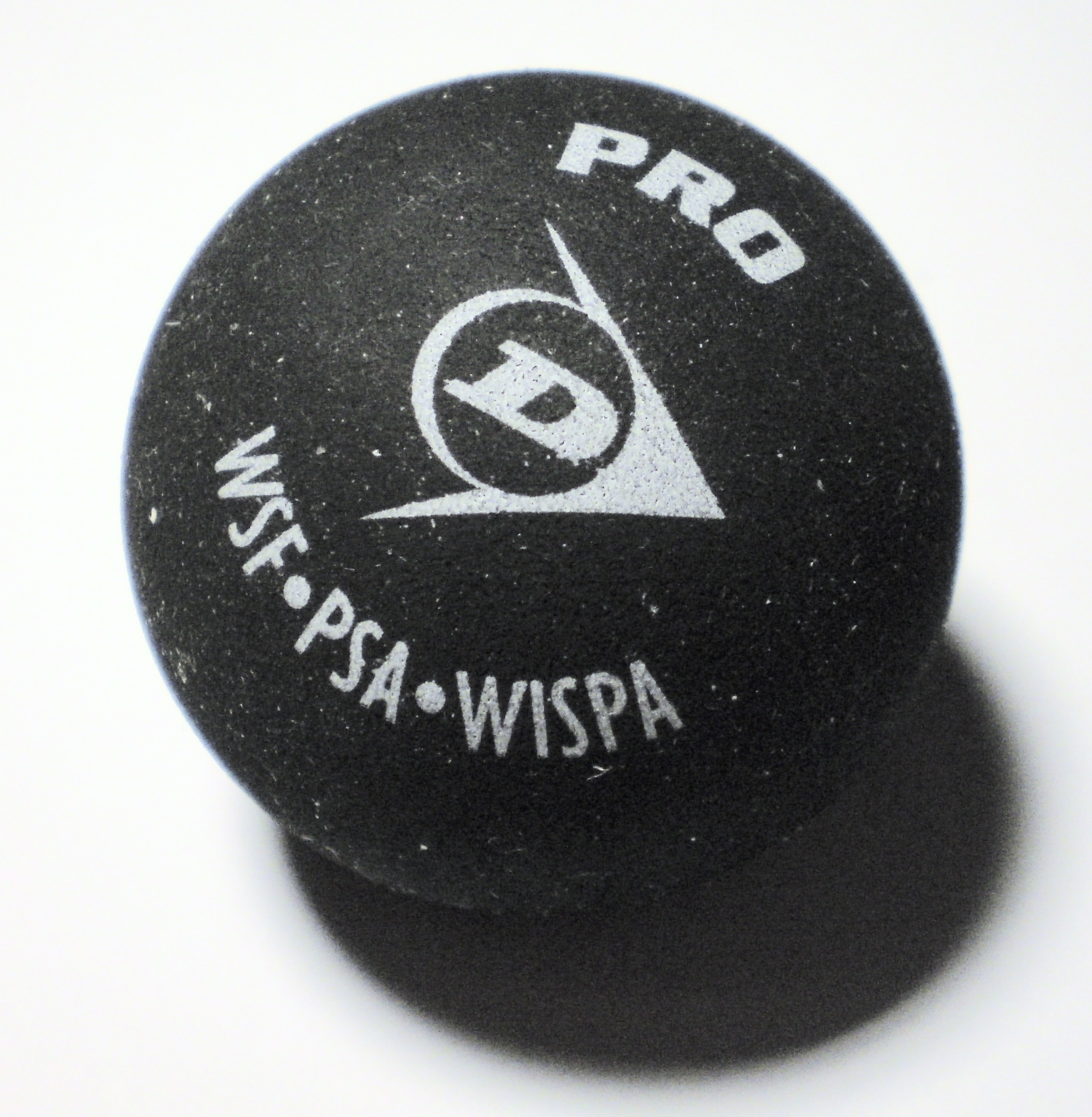
Tennis (left) and squash balls by Dunlop

In 1983, the John Letters golf club business was sold back to members of the Letters family. One year later, the sports businesses were merged to form Dunlop Slazenger.

In 1986, the parent company, Dunlop Holdings, was acquired by the industrial company BTR for £549 million. BTR cut marketing spending to just 8 per cent of sales and reduced investment in grass roots sponsorship and research and development. Steffi Graf's sponsorship money was cut, so she defected to a Wilson racket.

In 1996, Dunlop Slazenger was acquired by the private equity firm Cinven for £330 million. To save money, Cinven moved production of Dunlop tennis balls from England to the Philippines. Slazenger Golf and Maxfli were sold off to reduce debt.

Frasers Group bought Dunlop Slazenger for £40 million in 2004.

In December 2016, Sports Direct announced it had agreed to sell the Dunlop brand to Sumitomo Rubber Industries for £112 million ($137.5 million). Sumitomo already owned the rights to the sports as well as the rubber industries brand in most of the world. The sale is due to be completed by May 2017.

== Sponsorships ==
=== Tennis ===
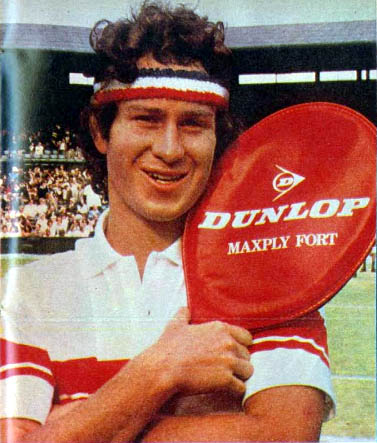
Dunlop advertisement featuring John McEnroe in 1981

More tennis Grand Slams have been won with Dunlop rackets than any other brand.

Dunlop Sport is the current supplier for the Australian Open as well as the ATP World Team Championship in Düsseldorf. It is also the official supplier for all three clay court ATP World Tour Masters 1000 tournaments, which include the Monte-Carlo Masters, the Rome Masters, and the Madrid Masters. As for ATP World Tour 500 tournaments, it is the official supplier for the Barcelona Open.

Additionally, Dunlop is the official supplier for ATP World Tour 250 tournaments at the BMW Open in Munich, the Portugal Open and the Open de Nice Côte d'Azur. Dunlop Sport is also the official supplier of the WTA Tour Volvo Cars Open in Charleston, South Carolina. Since 2025 Dunlop Sport is also became the official supplier of the ATP Tour Internazionali di Tennis San Marino Open in the Republic of San Marino.

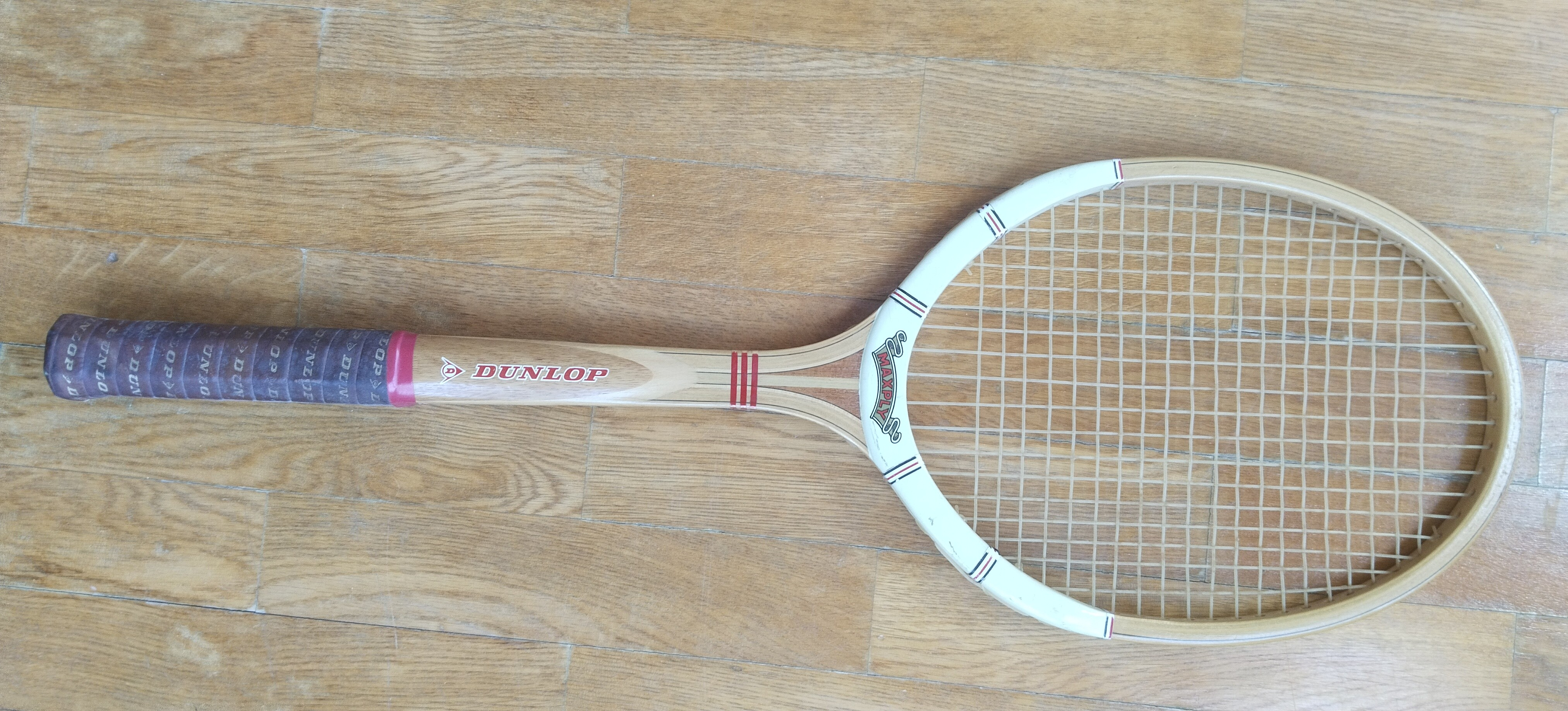
Dunlop tennis racket from the 1960s

Notable present and former players who have used Dunlop tennis rackets (and switched sponsorships) include:

==== Male ====
- (United Kingdom) Jamie Murray
- (United Kingdom) Jack Draper
- (Germany) Philipp Marx
- (South Africa) Kevin Anderson
- (Thailand) Sanchai Ratiwatana
- (United States) Bjorn Fratangelo
- (United States) Donald Young
- (Australia) Max Purcell
- (Italy) Roberto Marcora
- (Serbia) Miomir Kecmanović
- (Australia) Alexei Popyrin

==== Female ====
- (China) Wang Qiang
- (China) Xu Yifan
- (United Kingdom) Heather Watson (to 2021)
- (Japan) Misaki Doi
- (Japan) Yui Kamiji
- (Japan) Kurumi Nara
- (Kazakhstan) Zarina Diyas
- (Thailand) Luksika Kumkhum
- (United States) Ann Li
- (United States) Taylor Townsend

==== Retired players ====
- (Austria) Jürgen Melzer
- (Spain) Tommy Robredo
- (Australia) Pat Cash
- (Australia) Evonne Goolagong Cawley
- (Australia) Lew Hoad
- (Australia) Rod Laver
- (Australia) / (Federal Republic of Yugoslavia) Alicia Molik
- (Australia) Tony Roche
- (Australia) Pat Rafter
- (Australia) Mark Philippoussis
- (Brazil) Tiago Fernandes
- (Spain) Nicolás Almagro
- (Spain) Andrés Gimeno
- (France) Amélie Mauresmo
- (France) Cédric Pioline
- (United Kingdom) Jaroslav Drobný
- (United Kingdom) Ross Hutchins
- (United Kingdom) Helen Jacobs
- (United Kingdom) Jonathan Marray
- (United Kingdom) Greg Rusedski
- (United Kingdom) Virginia Wade
- (Germany) Marc-Kevin Goellner
- (Germany) Steffi Graf
- (Germany) Tommy Haas
- (Netherlands) Sjeng Schalken
- (Netherlands) Tom Okker
- (Poland) Agnieszka Radwańska
- (South Africa) Wayne Ferreira
- (Slovakia) Dominika Cibulková
- (Sweden) Thomas Johansson
- (Thailand) Danai Udomchoke
- (United States) John McEnroe
- (United States) Martina Navratilova
- (New Zealand) Onny Parun

=== Squash ===
Notable players who use Dunlop squash racquets include :

==== Male ====
- (Egypt) Ali Farag
- (England) Nick Matthew
- (France) Grégory Gaultier
- (Peru) Diego Elías
- (Malaysia) Eain Yow Ng
- (France) Victor Crouin

==== Female ====
- (Egypt) Nour El Tayeb
- (England) Alison Waters

=== Former players ===
- (Canada) Jonathon Power
- (Egypt) Amr Shabana
- (England) Lee Beachill
- (Australia) Stewart Boswell
- (England) Simon Parke
- (Wales) Alex Gough
- (Australia) Sarah Fitz-Gerald
- (England) Tania Bailey
- (Republic of Ireland) Madeline Perry
- (Netherlands) Natalie Grinham
- (Guyana) Nicolette Fernandes
- (England) Sarah Kippax
- (Republic of Ireland) Aisling Blake

==== Associations ====
- Professional Squash Association – Official ball
- Women's Squash Association – Official ball

== Former sponsorships ==
- (Argentina) Deportivo Español
- (Argentina) Gimnasia y Esgrima de Jujuy
- (Argentina) Gimnasia y Tiro
