= Wally Uihlein =

American businessman

- Born: 1949 (age 75–76); Haverhill, Massachusetts, U.S.
- Occupation: Businessman
- Known for: President and chief executive officer of the Acushnet Company

Wally Uihlein (/ˈjuːlaɪn/ YOO-lyne) (born 1949) in Haverhill, Massachusetts is a retired president and chief executive officer of the Acushnet Company, which comprises the golf brands Titleist, FootJoy, Pinnacle, and Scotty Cameron.

The Acushnet Company is publicly traded (NYSE) with a majority share owned by Fila Korea.

Uihlein (pronounced "U-Line") attended the University of Massachusetts Amherst and completed graduate courses in business management at Suffolk University in Boston.

In 1976, he joined Acushnet as a regional sales representative and within a year, Uihlein became Titleist's national sales manager. He was named vice president of sales and distribution in 1982, and was eventually named president and chief executive officer in May 2000.

Wally's son, Peter, was named Boys Rolex Junior Player of the Year in 2005. Peter won the 2010 U.S. Amateur and turned professional in 2012.
