= Bettinardi Golf =

American sports equipment company

- Company type: Private
- Industry: Sports equipment, textile
- Founded: 1998; 28 years ago
- Founder: Robert Bettinardi
- Headquarters: Tinley Park, Illinois, U.S.
- Area served: Worldwide
- Products: Putters, wedges, t-shirts
- Website: bettinardi.com

Bettinardi Golf is an American sports equipment company that produces a wide range of golf equipment and clothing. Bettinardi was founded in 1998 by Robert J. Bettinardi,

Some of the products manufactured and marketed include putters, wedges, and accessories (tees, headcovers, grips, bags). Bettinardi also markets a clothing line that includes t-shirts, polo shirts, and belts.

== History ==
Robert Bettinardi started his work in the putting industry in 1991 when he saw an advertisement from Callaway in a golf shop for a putter milled on a Bridgeport milling machine. At the time, Bettinardi owned his own manufacturing facility with CNC (computer numerical control) machines that did work for hydraulic companies and the communications industries. Bettinardi called Callaway and was put in touch with the company's then designer. Bettinardi was able to pick up work from this particular designer and make all of his putters from 1991 to 1993. At the time, putting technology entailed milling the head and the neck of the putter separately, then welding the neck on to the head. It was during this time that Bettinardi created the first ever one-piece milled putter out of a solid block of steel.

Other designers in the golf industry noticed Bettinardi's work which led to Robert making putters for Scotty Cameron from 1993 to 1998. All Titleist putters during this timeframe were milled by Robert in his own manufacturing facility and finished in California. During this time frame, Bettinardi was the go-to for milled putters from all of the other top original equipment manufacturers in the industry.

In 1998, Robert set out on his own to create his own brand, Bettinardi Golf.

Bettinardi Golf saw immediate success with victories on tour within the first few years of the company's founding. The uniqueness came from the patented Honeycomb milling pattern that Bettinardi created using a jewelers bit to create a perfectly flat face.

From 2003 to 2005, Bettinardi aligned with the Ben Hogan Golf Company, producing putters for them as "Hogan Milled By Bettinardi". The most notable victory during this period came from Jim Furyk at the 2003 US Open played at Olympia Fields CC.

Bettinardi left Hogan after Spalding, who owned Hogan at the time, was purchased by Callaway Golf.

From 2005 to 2008, Bettinardi partnered with Mizuno Golf, and again made products under the Mizuno brand named "Mizuno by Bettinardi". This partnership lasted three years and at the end of the agreement Bettinardi decided to branch out on his own again.

Since the partnership ended, Bettinardi Golf has earned 10 victories on the PGA Tour, and 3 on the Champions Tour. Most notably and presently, Matt Kuchar, Fred Couples, Jim Herman, Brian Gay, Edoardo Molinari, and Steven Bowditch use their putters.

In 2018, at the request of the Philadelphia Eagles, the company produced a limited edition Bettinardi BB1 blade putter featuring engravings honoring the team's first Super Bowl title with the date and 41–33 final score on the bumpers.

== Sponsorships ==
Golfers that won tournaments using Bettinardi equipment were:

=== U.S. PGA Tour ===
- 1999 Greater Greensboro Open- Jesper Parnevik
- 2000 Bob Hope Classic- Jesper Parnevik
- 2000 Colonial- Phil Mickelson
- 2001 WorldCom Classic (Harbourtown) – Jose Coceres
- 2002 Honda Classic- Matt Kuchar
- 2002 Southern Farm Bureau- Luke Donald
- 2002 EMC World Golf Championship- Japanese team of Toshimitsu Izawa and Shigeki Maruyama
- 2003 103rd US Open (Major)- Jim Furyk
- 2003 Buick Open- Jim Furyk
- 2003 Grand Slam of Golf- Jim Furyk
- 2004 Buick Open- Vijay Singh
- 2004 86th PGA Championship (Major)- Vijay Singh
- 2004 Deutsche Bank Championship- Vijay Singh
- 2004 The Bell Canadian Open- Vijay Singh
- 2005 MCI Heritage (Harbourtown)- Peter Lonard
- 2005 The Rex Hospital Open- Eric Axley
- 2006 Valero Texas Open- Eric Axely
- 2008 Mayakoba Golf Classic- Brian Gay
- 2009 Verizon Heritage- Brian Gay
- 2009 St. Jude Classic- Brian Gay
- 2009 Owens Corning Classic- Yi Eun-jung
- 2013 Humana Challenge (Bob Hope)- Brian Gay
- 2013 WGC-Accenture Match Play Championship- Matt Kuchar
- 2013 Memorial Tournament- Matt Kuchar
- 2013 Franklin Templeton Shootout- Matt Kuchar & Harris English
- 2014 RBC Heritage- Matt Kuchar
- 2015 AT&T Byron Nelson- Steven Bowditch
- 2016 Shell Houston Open- Jim Herman
- 2018 Quicken Loans National - Francesco Molinari
- 2018 Open Championship (Major) Francesco Molinari
- 2022 U.S. Open (Major) Matt Fitzpatrick
- 2023 RBC Heritage Matt Fitzpatrick

=== Champions Tour ===
- 2013 Charles Schwab Cup Championship- Fred Couples
- 2014 Toshiba Classic- Fred Couples
- 2014 Shaw Charity Classic- Fred Couples
- 2017 Chubb Classic- Fred Couples
- 2017 American Family Insurance Championship- Fred Couples

=== Sunshine Tour ===
- 2014 Zambia Sugar- Lyle Rowe

=== European Tour ===
- 2017 Trophee Hassan II- Edoardo Molinari

=== U.S. LPGA Tour ===
- 2004 Wegmans Rochester International- Kim Saiki
- 2004 Giant Eagle LPGA Classic- Moira Dunn
- 2017 Kingsmill Championship- Lexi Thompson
- 2017 Indy Women in Tech Championship- Lexi Thompson
- 2017 The Race to CME Globe- Lexi Thompson
