= Peter Uihlein =

American professional golfer (born 1989)

Personal information
- Nationality: United States
- Born: August 29, 1989 (age 37) New Bedford, Massachusetts, U.S.
- Height: 6 ft 1 in (1.85 m)
- Weight: 190 lb (86 kg; 14 st)

Career
- Sport: Golf
- College: Oklahoma State University
- Turned professional: 2011
- Current tours: LIV Golf; Asian Tour
- Former tours: PGA Tour; European Tour; Challenge Tour; Korn Ferry Tour
- Professional wins: 5
- Highest ranking: 48 (June 3, 2018) (as of October 25, 2026)

Number of wins by tour
- European Tour: 1
- Asian Tour: 2
- Korn Ferry Tour: 2
- Challenge Tour: 1

Best results in major championships
- Masters Tournament: CUT: 2011
- PGA Championship: CUT: 2013, 2017, 2018
- U.S. Open: T48: 2018
- The Open Championship: T44: 2017

Achievements and awards
- Mark H. McCormack Medal: 2010
- Ben Hogan Award: 2011
- Sir Henry Cotton Rookie of the Year: 2013

Peter Uihlein (/ˈjuːlaɪn/ YOO-lyne; born August 29, 1989) is an American professional golfer who formerly played on the PGA Tour and the European Tour and now plays in the LIV Golf League. He was a member of the victorious U.S. team at the 2009 Walker Cup, where he compiled a 4–0 match record. Uihlein won the 2010 U.S. Amateur and is a former number one ranked amateur golfer in the world.

== Early life ==
Uihlein was born in New Bedford, Massachusetts to Wally and Tina Uihlein, and grew up in Mattapoisett. Wally Uihlein is the retired chairman and chief executive officer of the Acushnet Company, a golf equipment manufacturer which comprises Titleist and other brands.

At age 13, Uihlein moved to Bradenton, Florida to attend the David Leadbetter Golf program, part of IMG Academy's Pendleton School. He was named Player of the Year by the American Junior Golf Association (AJGA) in 2005 and again in 2007, becoming the fifth boy in the award's history to win more than once, joining a list that includes Phil Mickelson and Tiger Woods. Uihlein was featured in a 2006 Sports Illustrated article spotlighting then-teenage athletes including Tyreke Evans, A. J. Green and John Tavares. In 2007, Uihlein won the Terra Cotta Invitational.

== Amateur career ==
In 2008, Uihlein chose to attend Oklahoma State University, where he struggled with his game for a long stretch during his freshman year. Nonetheless, he was named to the 2009 Walker Cup team and posted a 4–0 record for the victorious U.S. squad. He won the Dixie Amateur in December and became the world's number one ranked amateur golfer in May 2010. After runner-up finishes at the Big 12 Championship and the NCAA Division I Men's Golf Championships, Uihlein won the Sahalee Players Championship by seven strokes.

On his 21st birthday, Uihlein defeated David Chung 4 & 2 in the 36-hole final of the U.S. Amateur at Chambers Bay in University Place, Washington. Uihlein became the fourth Oklahoma State player to win the event, and first since Scott Verplank in 1984. In September, Uihlein won the Mark H. McCormack Medal for being on top of the World Amateur Golf Ranking at the end of the amateur season, following the European Amateur and U.S. Amateur events.

During his junior year, Uihlein won the Ben Hogan Award, given to the best college golfer in the nation. He was also named a first team All-American. Uihlein tried unsuccessfully to defend his U.S. Amateur title in 2011 when he lost in the quarterfinals. He played the European and PGA Tour qualifying schools in 2011, but failed to earn tour cards on either tour. He decided to turn professional in December 2011.

== Professional career ==
Uihlein finished in a tie for 12th at his first professional event on the Challenge Tour at the 2012 Gujarat Kensville Challenge. Uihlein has also played on the Sunshine Tour, where he finished T4 at the 2013 Tshwane Open, an event co-sanctioned with the European Tour. Uihlein earned his first professional win in 2013 at the Madeira Islands Open, a dual-ranked event on the European Tour and Challenge Tour. He ranked 14th in the 2013 Race to Dubai money list with eight top-10 finishes, and was named the European Tour's Sir Henry Cotton Rookie of the Year.

In 2017, Uihlein played the Puerto Rico Open on the PGA Tour via a sponsor's exemption and finished fifth. A week later, he finished 23rd at the Shell Houston Open. These earned him enough FedEx Cup points for a place in the 2017 Web.com Tour Finals. He won the first tournament to earn a place on the PGA Tour for 2017–18.

Uihlein played 26 events on the 2017–18 PGA Tour, making the cut 16 times. He had eight top-25 finishes, four top-10 finishes, and three top-five finishes. In round three of the Wells Fargo Championship, he had a birdie/eagle streak of 7-under on six holes, which tied him with Jonathan Randolph for the longest streak on the PGA Tour for the 2017–18 PGA season. He finished at number 64 in the FedEx Cup standings, qualifying him for the FedEx Cup playoffs in his rookie season, winning $1.8 million for the season.

During the 2018–19 season, Uihlein played a total of 29 events on the PGA Tour. His best results were a T7 at the RSM Classic in November 2018, and a T5 in May 2019 at the AT&T Byron Nelson tournament. He won $840,000 during the season, finishing at number 133 in the FedEx Cup standings.

In 2021, Uihlein won his second Korn Ferry Tour event at the MGM Resorts Championship. He would go on to earn his PGA Tour card for 2022 with a Top 25 finish in the Korn Ferry Tour Finals.

On June 9, 2022, Uihlein was one of 17 PGA Tour members suspended for playing in the Saudi-backed LIV Golf.

In 2023, Uihlein competed as part of 4Aces GC in the 2023 LIV Golf League. He finished in 12th place in the individual standings, and had a season-best finish of 2nd place at the opening event of the season at Mayakoba. He also had three other top-ten finishes on the season. After the season, Uihlein was re-signed by the 4Aces, but was traded to RangeGoats GC on December 7, 2023.

== Amateur wins ==
- 2006 St. Augustine Amateur
- 2007 Terra Cotta Invitational
- 2009 Dixie Amateur
- 2010 Sahalee Players Championship, U.S. Amateur, Dixie Amateur
- 2011 Northeast Amateur

== Professional wins (5) ==
=== European Tour wins (1) ===
No.	Date	Tournament	Winning score	To par	Margin of victory	Runners-up
1	May 19, 2013	Madeira Islands Open - Portugal - BPI^{1}	72-64-69-68=273	−15	2 strokes	(Denmark) Morten Ørum Madsen, (Chile) Mark Tullo

^{1}Dual-ranking event with the Challenge Tour

European Tour playoff record (0–1)

No.	Year	Tournament	Opponent	Result
1	2013	Alfred Dunhill Links Championship	(England) David Howell	Lost to birdie on second extra hole

=== Asian Tour wins (2) ===
Legend
International Series (2)
Other Asian Tour (0)

No.	Date	Tournament	Winning score	To par	Margin of victory	Runner(s)-up
1	Aug 11, 2024	International Series England	71-61-69-63=264	−20	7 strokes	(England) Andy Sullivan, (United States) Caleb Surratt
2	Nov 30, 2024	International Series Qatar	68-64-71-69=272	−16	5 strokes	(South Africa) Charl Schwartzel

=== Korn Ferry Tour wins (2) ===
Legend
Finals events (1)
Other Korn Ferry Tour (1)

No.	Date	Tournament	Winning score	To par	Margin of victory	Runner(s)-up
1	Sep 3, 2017	Nationwide Children's Hospital Championship	69-69-67-65=270	−14	1 stroke	(United States) Ryan Armour
2	Apr 18, 2021	MGM Resorts Championship	68-67-68-69=272	−16	4 strokes	(United States) David Lipsky, (United States) Jamie Lovemark

Korn Ferry Tour playoff record (0–1)

No.	Year	Tournament	Opponent	Result
1	2022	Chitimacha Louisiana Open	(China) Yuan Yechun	Lost to birdie on first extra hole

=== Challenge Tour wins (1) ===
No.	Date	Tournament	Winning score	To par	Margin of victory	Runners-up
1	May 19, 2013	Madeira Islands Open - Portugal - BPI^{1}	72-64-69-68=273	−15	2 strokes	(Denmark) Morten Ørum Madsen, (Chile) Mark Tullo

^{1}Dual-ranking event with the European Tour

== Playoff record ==
LIV Golf Invitational Series playoff record (0–1)

No.	Year	Tournament	Opponent	Result
1	2022	LIV Golf Invitational Jeddah	(United States) Brooks Koepka	Lost to birdie on third extra hole

== Results in major championships ==
Tournament	2011	2012	2013	2014	2015	2016	2017	2018
Masters Tournament	CUT							
U.S. Open	CUT						CUT	T48
The Open Championship	T48			CUT			T44	CUT
PGA Championship			CUT				CUT	CUT

Tournament	2019	2020	2021	2022	2023	2024	2025	2026
Masters Tournament								
PGA Championship								
U.S. Open								T56
The Open Championship		NT						T65

Did not play

CUT = missed the half-way cut
"T" = tied for place
NT = no tournament due to COVID-19 pandemic

=== Summary ===
Tournament	Wins	2nd	3rd	Top-5	Top-10	Top-25	Events	Cuts made
Masters Tournament	0	0	0	0	0	0	1	0
U.S. Open	0	0	0	0	0	0	4	2
The Open Championship	0	0	0	0	0	0	5	3
PGA Championship	0	0	0	0	0	0	3	0
Totals	0	0	0	0	0	0	13	5

- Most consecutive cuts made – 2 (2026 U.S. Open – 2026 Open Championship, current)
- Longest streak of top-10s – 0

== Results in The Players Championship ==
Tournament	2019
The Players Championship	CUT

CUT = missed the halfway cut

== Results in World Golf Championships ==
Results not in chronological order before 2015.

Tournament	2013	2014	2015	2016	2017	2018
Championship		T25				T37
Match Play						T17
Invitational						
Champions	T55				T5	

Top 10
Did not play

QF, R16, R32, R64 = Round in which player lost in match play
"T" = tied

== U.S. national team appearances ==
- Walker Cup: 2009 (winners), 2011
- Eisenhower Trophy: 2010

== See also ==
- 2017 Web.com Tour Finals graduates
- 2021 Korn Ferry Tour Finals graduates
- List of male golfers
