= Misto Holdings =

South Korean sportswear company

Misto Holdings Corporation
- Native name: 주식회사 미스토홀딩스
- Type: Public
- Traded as: KRX: 081660
- Founded: 1991; 35 years ago
- Founder: Gene Yoon
- Headquarters: Seoul, South Korea
- Divisions: Fila
- Subsidiaries: Acushnet Company
- Website: mistoholdings.com

Misto Holdings Corporation (Korean: 미스토홀딩스 주식회사), formerly known as Fila Holdings, is a South Korea–based holding company that owns and oversees multiple consumer brands, primarily in sportswear, footwear, and golf-related products.

== History ==
The history of Misto Holdings began in 1991 when Yoon Yoon-soo, also known as Gene Yoon, joined italian sportswear brand Fila to lead its South Korean operations. In 2007, Yoon orchestrated a USD 400 million leveraged buyout, successfully acquiring the global Fila brand and its international subsidiaries from Cerberus Capital Management. The company went public on the Korea Exchange in 2010. Furthermore, the company expanded its business by acquiring Acushnet Holdings, the parent company of premium golf brands, including Titleist, FootJoy, Scotty Cameron, Kjus and Vokey. In 2025, the company changed its name from Fila Holdings to Misto Holdings.

== See also ==
- List of sporting goods manufacturers
