= Terry McCabe =

American golf club designer

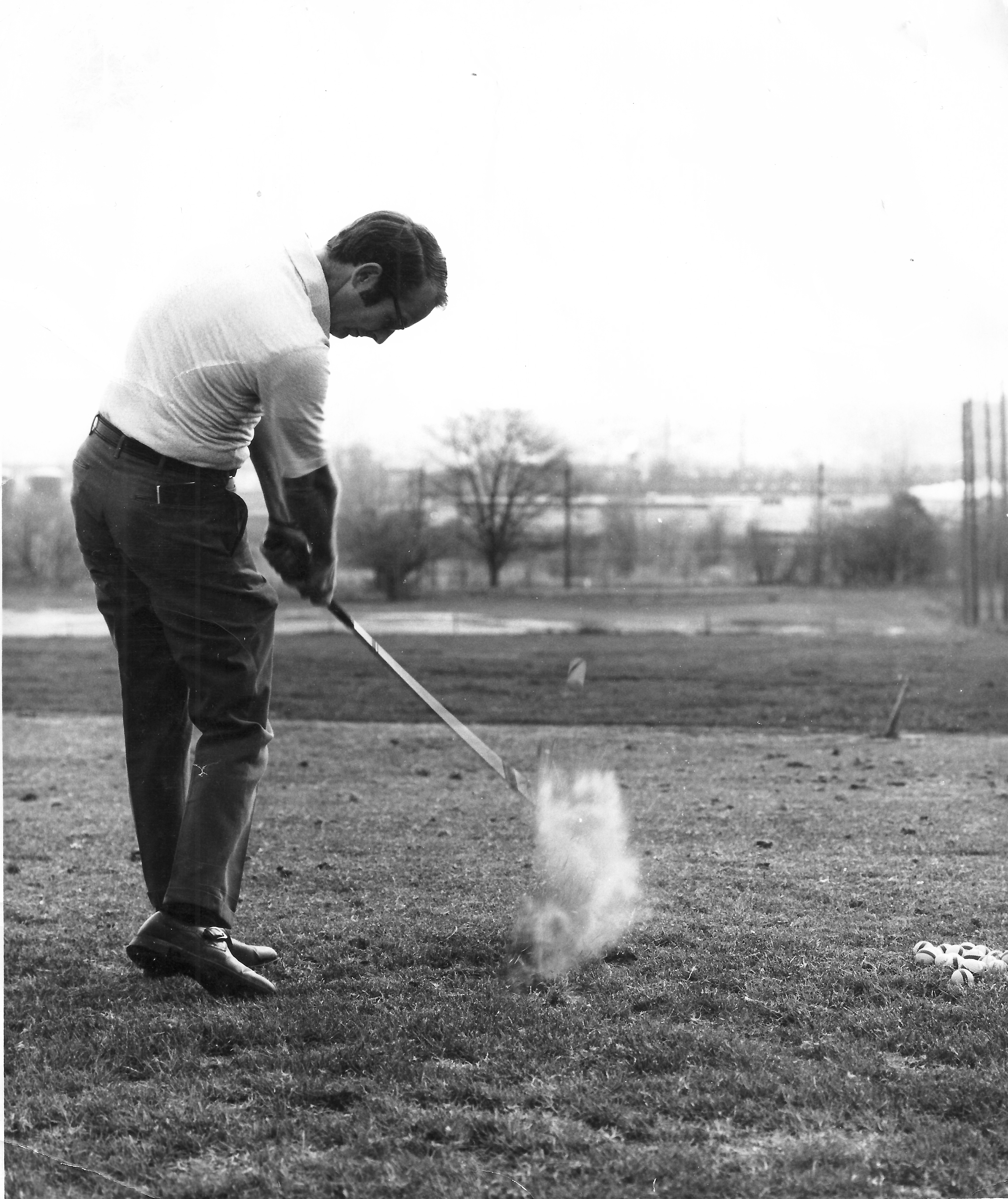
- Terry McCabe, Cincinnati, OH 1975

Personal information
- Full name: Terrill Ross McCabe
- Nicknames: Terry, Big T
- Born: February 5, 1946 Fresno, California
- Died: April 12, 2013 (aged 67) Carlsbad, California

Career
- Sport: Golf
- Turned professional: 1969

Terrill "Terry" McCabe (February 5, 1946 – April 12, 2013) was an American golf club designer and innovator. His peers have labeled him a 'master craftsman' and "Quite simply, the best metalwood designer in golf, as proved at TaylorMade, Founders Club and Titleist."

He designed the first commercially successful metal wood, the TaylorMade Burner & Tour Preferred Drivers. He is well known for his work at Titleist, designing most notably the 975D driver.

== Early life and character ==
Born in Fresno, California, McCabe became an accomplished violinist and archer at a very young age. In 1960, at the age of 14 he played in the Fresno Philharmonic. He had already begun playing golf by this time and was working in a local golf club custom repair shop. He was fascinated with how instruments were built so he began studying violin making and created parts for violins. He then applied his interest to fletching feathers on arrows and lastly he turned to designing and building golf clubs. He attended two years of college before entering the U.S. Air Force where he gained high level security clearance working in cryptography. After his service, he moved to Cincinnati and turned professional. His passion for building golf clubs reemerged as he started his first golf company in 1970. Throughout his life, Terry competed in many local and national golf tournaments. He was a long time Class A member of the PGA of America, and while working at Titleist qualified and competed in the 1999 U.S. Senior Open & the 2000, 2001 Senior British Open. McCabe was a strong advocate of manufacturing jobs in the United States, which he garnered from watching such companies as Coastcast Corp. struggle as golf companies moved manufacturing overseas in the 90's. He moved his personal master mold maker, Jose Perez, from Coastcast at the time he began working for Titleist. McCabe was a strong supporter of repealing the 17th Amendment, which would return the senate vote back to the state legislature.

== T-LINE ==
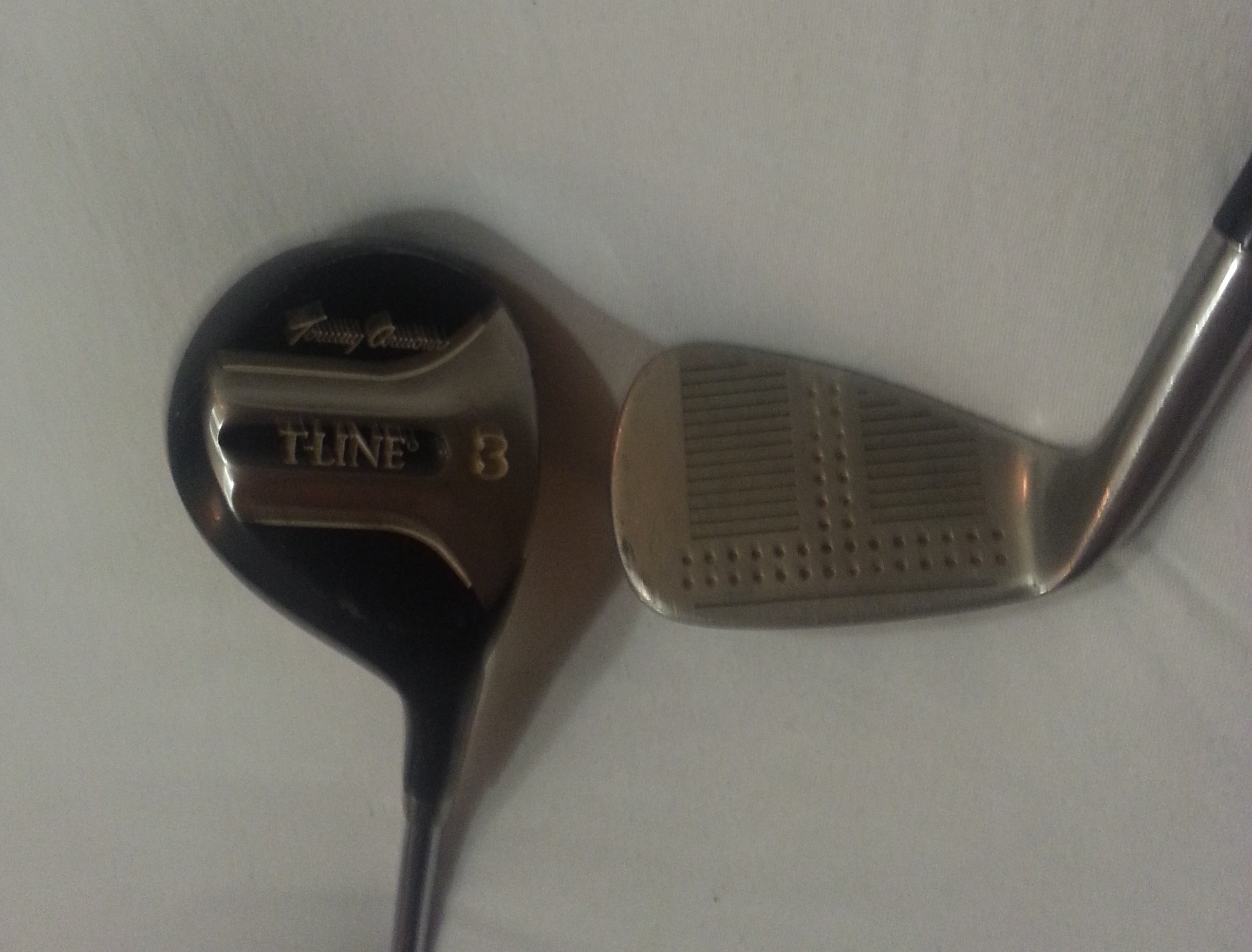
T-LINE 3 wood and wedge

McCabe's first club designs were the T-LINE putters. He licensed his designs to PGA Golf which then became Tommy Armour Golf. It was at PGA Golf where Terry met Gary Adams, who later started TaylorMade. Under the T-LINE name McCabe also designed a set of irons and 'metalwoods'. The T-LINE Metalwoods were created in 1978 using the investment cast process, which is still used in manufacturing of metalwoods today.

== T.P.A. putters ==
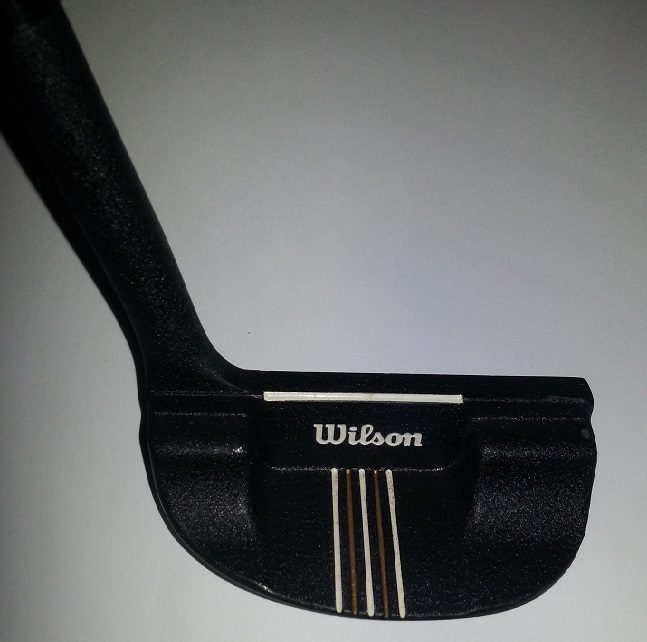
TPA XVIII putter

T-Square Precision Alignment. Licensed and sold through TaylorMade and then through Wilson Sporting Goods. McCabe's best selling TPA putter was the TPA XVIII used by Nick Faldo to win the 1989, 1990 Masters and the 1990 Open Championship. Hale Irwin and Scott Simpson won U.S. Opens with TPA putters in 1990 and 1987. McCabe also designed a very popular pistol-style grip for the T.P.A Putters under the name PRO-ARCH.

== TaylorMade metal woods ==
In 1979, McCabe involved with John Zebillian and Bob McCullean in developing what today is known as a "metal wood". While the origin of the metal woods date back to the late 1800s, the product they developed was made using the investment cast process. The product was produced by making a hollow stainless steel head shell to which a stainless steel soleplate was welded. The same technology is used today to produce "metal woods" McCabe's friend and business associate, Gary Adams, founded TaylorMade in 1979 after leaving PGA Golf. McCabe is quoted as saying "in my opinion, it was through Gary Adams efforts and his marketing talents that we even have metal woods today...it is further my opinion, that it was through his unique contribution that TaylorMade and Callaway exist today." McCabe designed the Original TaylorMade Metal Woods, Tour Preferred & Burner Metal Woods. The "Tour Preferred" metal woods were the most successful selling over 1 million woods one year.

== Founders Club ==
McCabe, Gary Adams, Frank Gallager and others started Founders Club in 1989. Asics was a financial partner and ultimately took control of the company. McCabe designed the Fresh Metal line of metal woods which quickly became the #1 driver on the PGA tour. Asics took control of the company soon after Founders Club became successful. With McCabe's longtime friend Gary Adams (golf) ill with cancer, McCabe filed a lawsuit against Asics as the 'alter ego' of Founders Club for breach of contract and fraud stemming from several contract issues and refusal to pay royalties. In June 1994, McCabe won the lawsuit and Asics was required to destroy all of the molds and masters designed by McCabe.

== Titleist ==
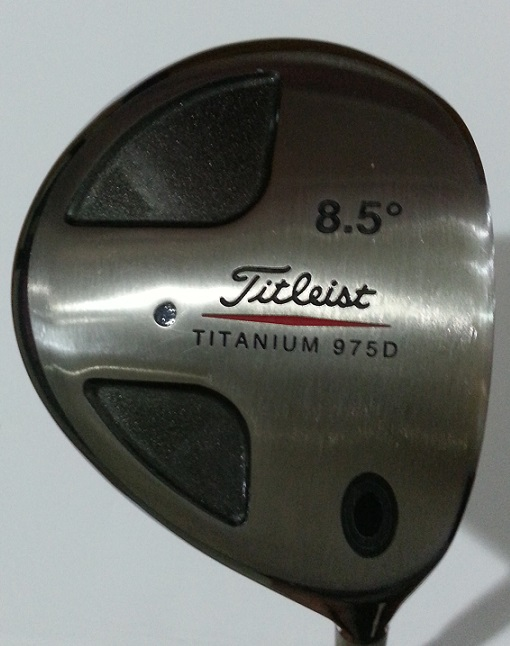
975D Driver by Terry McCabe

In 1996, McCabe joined Titleist as the director of research & development. McCabe was hired by Wally Uihlein to revitalize the Titleist Brand into 'serious clubs for serious golfers'. McCabe's first mission was to create a driver that would re-establish Titleist's Brand. The 975D driver later became the #1 driver on the PGA Tour. McCabe's designs included the 975D, 975E, 975EFS, 975LLF, 975LFE, 975J, 975JVS drivers. The 975F, 970, the retro PT13 and PT15 bore through fairway woods. The 681(played by Tiger Woods & Greg Norman), PM731(played by Phil Mickelson), 690MB, 690CB, & 680 forged irons. The first Vokey wedges, the BV 256.14 and BV 260.08, were the works of McCabe and his personal master model maker, Jose Perez, who is still currently active at Titleist.

== Patents and trademarks ==
McCabe earned his first patent in 1975 at the age of 29. He accumulated a patent portfolio of 29 patents where he is the listed inventor. Over his career he registered 10 trademarks and applied trade dress for marketing.
