= List of Clarkson University alumni =

Following is a list of Clarkson University alumni.

== Business ==
Name	Class	Major	Notability	References
Barney Adams			Founder of Adams Golf	
Donald C. Clark Sr.			Former chief executive officer of Household International	
Rene Haas			engineer and current CEO of Arm Ltd.	
Paul Horn			Former senior vice president of IBM Corporation and executive director of IBM Research	
Ilmārs Rimšēvičs			Governor of the Central Bank of Latvia	
Martin Roesch			CEO of Netography, founder of Sourcefire, and author of Snort	

== Education ==
Name	Class	Major	Notability	References
Gregory C. Farrington			Former president of Lehigh University, executive director of the California Academy of Sciences	
Sanjeev Kulkarni			Professor and dean of the faculty at Princeton University	
Annie Selden			Professor and co-founder of the Association for Women in Mathematics	

== Entertainment ==
Name	Class	Major	Notability	References
Albert Bouchard			Co-founder of Blue Öyster Cult	
Harvey Glatt			Founder of CHEZ-FM radio; Canadian music impresario	
Arnold Gosewich			Record industry executive and literary agent	
Kaitlin Monte	2006		Miss New York 2011, Miss America 2012 second runner-up, TV news anchor	
Donald Roeser			Co-founder of Blue Öyster Cult	
Brenda Romero			Video game industry pioneer and video game designer	
Jim Tasikas			Co-founder of the Contrarian (band)	
M. Emmet Walsh	1958	Business Administration	Actor	

== Government and military ==
Name	Class	Major	Notability	References
Nelson F. Gibbs			Former United States assistant secretary of the Air Force	
Lisa Hershman			Chief management officer of the Department of Defense	
Roger Johnson			Administrator of General Services	
Rob Joyce	1989	Electrical and Computer Engineering	White House Homeland Security adviser and cybersecurity coordinator on the U.S. National Security Council	
Thomas "Pat" Flanders	1989	Electrical and Computer Engineering	Defense Health Agency Chief Information Officer	
Martin E. Lind	1953	Business Administration	US Army major general	

== Politics ==
Name	Class	Major	Notability	References
Francis K. Brooks			Vermont House of Representatives and Vermont Senate	
Bob Chiarelli			Former mayor of Ottawa, Ontario, Canada	
Katherina Reiche			German politician	
Dede Scozzafava			Former New York State assemblywoman	
Dan Stec			New York state senator	
Paul Tonko			United States House of Representatives	

== Science and technology ==
Name	Class	Major	Notability	References
Timothy Canham			Software engineer at NASA; software and operations lead for Ingenuity	
Russ Nelson			Computer programmer and founding board member of the Open Source Initiative	
George C. Schatz			Theoretical chemist and nanotech researcher at Northwestern University	
Thomas Zacharia			Laboratory director at the Oak Ridge National Laboratory	

== Sports ==
Name	Class	Major	Notability	References
Mark Borowiecki			Professional hockey player	
Chris Clark			Professional hockey player	
Grant Clitsome			Professional hockey player	
Erik Cole			Professional hockey player, Olympian, and Stanley Cup champion	
Craig Conroy			Professional hockey player and Olympian	
Steve Dubinsky			Professional hockey player	
Renata Fast			Professional hockey player and Olympian	
Loren Gabel			Professional hockey player and Patty Kazmaier Award winner	
Kent Huskins			Professional hockey player and Stanley Cup champion	
Randy Jones			Professional hockey player	
Jarmo Kekäläinen			Professional hockey player and National Hockey League executive	
Craig Laughlin			Professional hockey player and television analyst for Washington Capitals games	
Todd Marchant			Professional hockey player, Olympian, and Stanley Cup champion	
Willie Mitchell			Professional hockey player and Stanley Cup champion	
Colin Patterson			Professional hockey player and Stanley Cup champion	
Jack Phillips			Professional baseball player and coach	
Jamie Lee Rattray			Professional hockey player, Olympian, and Patty Kazmaier Award winner	
Mike Smith			National Hockey League executive	
Nico Sturm			Professional hockey player and Stanley Cup champion	
Dave Taylor			Professional hockey player and National Hockey League executive	
Todd White			Professional hockey player	
Haley Winn			Professional hockey player and Olympian	
