= Dave Pelz =

American golf coach (1939–2025)

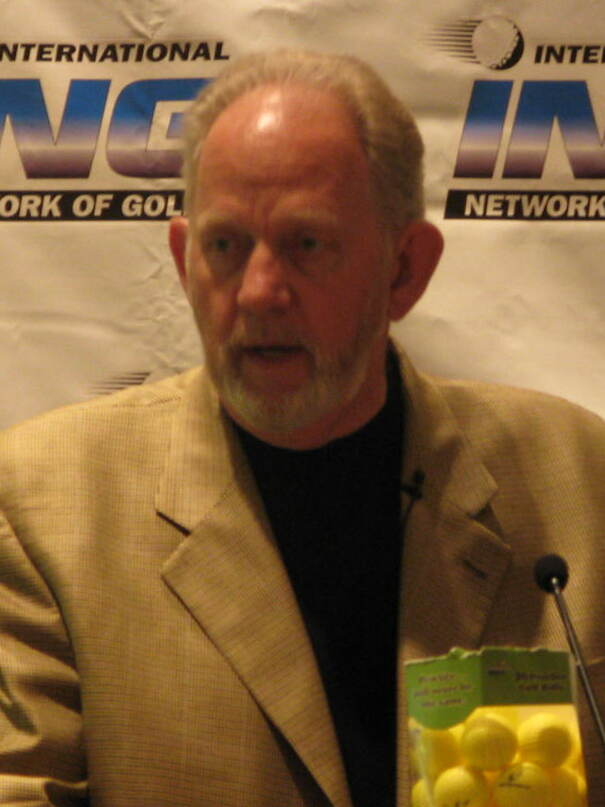
- Pelz at the PGA Show in 2008
- Born: David Todd Pelz; October 8, 1939; Indianapolis, Indiana, U.S.
- Died: March 23, 2025 (aged 85); Dripping Springs, Texas, U.S.
- Education: Indiana University Bloomington (BS)
- Occupation: Golf coach
- Website: pelzgolf.com

David Todd Pelz (October 8, 1939 – March 23, 2025) was an American golf coach, known for his expertise and published writing on the art of the short game, particularly putting.

Pelz's Short Game Bible was a New York Times "national best-seller" in 1999. Eleven of Pelz's professional students have won a total of 21 major championships. Pelz was named by Golf Digest magazine as one of the 25 most influential instructors of the 20th Century. He was a regular editorial contributor to Golf Magazine since 1982 and produced and hosted "The Dave Pelz Scoring Game Show" on the Golf Channel from 1995 to 2005. Pelz continued his research and instruction at the Pelz Golf Institute in Spicewood, Texas.

== Biography ==
Pelz attended Indiana University on a four-year golf scholarship where he majored in physics. He played, and lost to, Jack Nicklaus on 22 occasions.

=== NASA ===
In 1961, Pelz joined NASA, working at the Goddard Space Flight Center doing research on the upper atmospheres of the Earth and other planets in the Solar System. Pelz became a senior scientist with responsibilities for several satellite programs, including Explorer.

==== Initial research ====
Pelz, still disappointed at his own inability to make the grade for the PGA Tour, decided to apply his knowledge of physics to the game. Pelz's own weakness was his short game, so in 1970 he began measuring what happens when the putter head strikes the ball, and how the mechanics of player and club swing through the putter. His research led to the development of the "Teacher Putter" patent. Pelz improved his putting enough to qualify for, and play in, the U.S. Amateur, though he lost in the second round, and he finished as a medalist in the Maryland State Amateur. His experiences convinced him that good putting, far from being solely a natural ability, could be learned.

In 1975, Pelz took a leave of absence from NASA and started Preceptor Golf, formed to manufacture and market the Teacher Putter. At first, the USGA ruled against the Teacher Putter, saying it was "designed to be adjustable during play." They later ruled if two separate inserts were used, it would conform to the rules. In 1996, the USGA again banned the Teacher Putter on the grounds that it is not "plain in shape."

=== Preceptor Golf ===
Pelz resigned from NASA on January 1, 1976, to concentrate on his golfing endeavors. Preceptor Golf began to offer custom-fitted clubs, and developed a method of engraving a player's signature on each head in a set of stainless steel clubs. Pelz also launched his "Teacher Clips", a development which turns any putter into a "Teacher Putter"-like club; and developed "The True Roller", a device that rolls a perfect putt and was integral to his later research into putting.

In 1977, Pelz began an analysis of every shot in golf. Using caddies, tour players and amateur golfers, he spent more than three years entering the data from thousands of rounds (shot distance, where each shot landed, relation to target, and so forth), coming to the conclusion that more than 60% of golf shots are part of the 'short game' - those made from within around 100 yards of the hole. He discovered that players with the best short games win the most money, and that while touring professionals miss shots from further than 100 yards from the hole by an average 7% of the total shot distance, that percentage rises to 16–20% on shots from within 100 yards. This research formed the basis for many of his future efforts in golf, and led to Preceptor launching "Frequency Analyzers", becoming the first club manufacturer to offer frequency-matched sets of clubs.

Using this analysis, Pelz began teaching and coaching PGA Tour players one-on-one in their short and putting games. Andy North became the first Pelz student to win a major championship, winning the U.S. Open at Cherry Hills Country Club.

In 1982, Preceptor launched the "Quick Change Hosel", which allows players to easily interchange shafts and clubs. This becomes the basis for their new custom club-fitting system, which concentrated on ball performance instead of players' heights, weights and similar factors. In 1984, after Pelz had tested clubs on 500 golfers, Preceptor launched the "FeatherLite" line of clubs, the first golf clubs with lighter heads on more flexible shafts.

In 1983, Barney Adams had joined Dave Pelz Golf Inc., which included Preceptor. When Preceptor went bankrupt in 1986, Adams bought the assets and started Adams Golf, which he moved to Dallas, Texas in 1991.

=== Dave Pelz Golf ===
Following the collapse of Preceptor Golf, Pelz continued to focus on golf research and tuition, while also undertaking more writing and broadcasting to bring his theories to a wider audience.

While teaching at the "Short Game School" in Austin, Texas, Pelz felt his theories to be partially vindicated when one of his pupils, an amateur from Midland-Odessa, defeated Ben Crenshaw in the Texas State Putting Championship. In 1996 Pelz staged his first World Putting Championship at Walt Disney World in Orlando, Florida, with 17,000 participants competing for a $250,000 top prize. The winner was PGA Tour player Len Mattiace.

Having started writing for Golf Magazine in 1983, from 1995 to 2005 Pelz wrote and appeared in thirteen half-hour shows per year on the Golf Channel. He also appears on their Live from the Majors telecasts, and continues to contribute monthly instructional articles in Golf Magazine.

Pelz's Short Game Bible was a New York Times national best-seller in 1999. He later published Dave Pelz's 10 Minutes a Day to Better Putting, Putt Like the Pros, and Dave Pelz's Putting Bible. Pelz also produced four videos, “Dave Pelz's 10 Minutes a Day to Better Putting”, “Fundamentals of Wedge Play”, “Developing Great Touch”, and “The Amazing Truth About Putting.”

Pelz's research resulted in patented product developments, many of which are now licensed to major manufacturers. The patented two- and three-ball putters were licensed to Callaway Golf, becoming the Odyssey Golf Two-Ball putter. Pelz offers two wedge lines, each with aggressive groove designs.

In 2004, while filming a television segment for the Golf Channel during PGA Championship week at Whistling Straits in Kohler, Wisconsin, Pelz holed a 206-foot putt.

== The Scoring Game ==
Pelz began teaching PGA professionals on an individual basis in 1978, and in 1982 designed his first Short Game and Putting training facility, located in Abilene, Texas.

Today, Dave Pelz Scoring Game Schools include an analysis of each individual's game, classroom theory sessions, and outdoor execution sessions. The program is designed to produce long term improvement in golfers’ ability to score. Schools are located:

- The Boca Raton Resort and Club (Boca Raton, Florida)
- Cimarron Golf Resort (Palm Springs, California)
- Centennial Golf Club (Carmel, New York)
- Grand Traverse Resort & Spa (Traverse City, Michigan)
- PGA National Golf Club (Palm Beach Gardens, Florida)
- Chateau Elan Winery & Resort (Atlanta, Georgia)
- Killeen Castle (Dunsany, County Meath, Ireland) - opened 2008, first school outside North America
- Ak-Chin Southern Dunes Golf Club (Phoenix, Arizona)
- Chardonnay Golf Club (Napa, California)
- Cog Hill Golf & Country Club (Lemont, Illinois)
- Pronghorn (Bend, Oregon)
- Omni La Costa Resort and Spa (Carlsbad, California)
- Lansdowne Golf Resort (Washington, District of Columbia)
- Stoke Park, Buckinghamshire, England
- Green Eagle, Hamburg, Germany

== Students who have won professional majors ==
Name	Major championships won	Notes
Mark Brooks	1996 PGA Championship	
Steve Elkington	1995 PGA Championship	
Lee Janzen	1993 U.S. Open; 1998 U.S. Open	
Tom Kite	1992 U.S. Open	
Phil Mickelson	2004 Masters Tournament; 2005 PGA Championship; 2006 Masters Tournament; 2010 Masters Tournament; 2013 Open Championship; 2021 PGA Championship	
Andy North	1978 U.S. Open; 1985 U.S. Open	First Pelz student to win a major championship
Patrick Reed	2018 Masters Tournament	
Vijay Singh	1998 PGA Championship; 2000 Masters Tournament; 2004 PGA Championship	
Payne Stewart	1999 U.S. Open	
Mike Weir	2003 Masters Tournament	

== Developments and patents ==
Pelz held 17 patents on golf equipment, and developed numerous other products:

- 1975 – Teacher Putter
- 1979 – Teacher Alignment Computer (TAC)
- 1984 – FeatherLite line of clubs
- 1984 – Blind Glasses incorporate an LCD screen that an applied voltage makes opaque. During custom fitting sessions, players can see their ball until the moment of impact, and then the glasses turn opaque
- 1986 – 2-Ball and 3-Ball Putters, which were licensed to Callaway Golf and became the Odyssey Golf range
- 1987 – Truth Board training device to help golfers learn the feel of (and remove fear from) a well-struck three-foot putt
- 1988 – PGA Tour groove test, which proved how much more backspin and stopping power was produced by box grooves, as compared to standard V-grooves in wedges and high-lofted irons
- 1990 – LazrAimer voice-activated putting alignment trainer
- 2001 – Tee Square, Cup Collar and Dave Pelz's Putting Tutor
- 2002 – PelzMeter green-speed measurement device, developed by son Eddie Pelz, debuts at the U.S. Open at Bethpage Black
- 2003 – O-Balls with innovative cover markings, the first regulation golf ball to provide feedback to golfers after putting, to actually improve their putting strokes
- 2005 – Position Mat practice aid, enabling golfers to practice sand, wedge and chip shots from the proper stance (feet) and ball positions

=== Innovations ===
- 3 X 4 System – controlling distance in wedge play
- The Pendulum – putting method
- Pure-In-Line-Stroke – putting methods
- Dead Hands Pitching – showed the value of higher lofted wedges (he developed the first 60 and 64-degree lofted wedges)
- Optimum Putting Speed – the speed putts should be rolled for holing the most putts possible

== Publications ==
- Putt Like the Pros
- Dave Pelz's Short Game Bible - The New York Times Best Seller list No.1 best seller
- Dave Pelz's Putting Bible
- Fundamentals of Wedge Play - instructional video, Spring 2003
- 10 Minutes a Day to Better Putting
- Dave Pelz's Damage Control
- Dave Pelz's Golf Without Fear
- Dave Pelz's Putting Games

== Personal life and death ==
Pelz was born October 8, 1939, in Indianapolis, and attended Indiana University on a golf scholarship, majoring in physics with minors in mathematics, philosophy and astronomy.

Pelz died at his home in Dripping Springs, Texas, on March 23, 2025, at the age of 85.
