= Misto =

Misto may refer to:

- Místo, a municipality and village in the Czech Republic
- Misto, another term for Café au lait
- Misto (novel), a 1928 novel by Valerian Pidmohylny
- Misto (animal), the result of a breeding between a male alpaca and a female llama (the opposite cross from a huarizo)
- Misto Holdings, a South Korean sports equipment company

== See also ==
- Mixed Group (Italian: Gruppo Misto), a parliamentary group active in both houses of the Italian Parliament
