= Scotty Cameron =

American sports equipment brand

- Product type: Golf putters
- Current owner: Acushnet Company
- Produced by: Don Cameron
- Country: United States
- Introduced: 1991; 35 years ago in California
- Related brands: Titleist
- Markets: U.S.
- Previous owners: Fortune Brands
- Website: scottycameron.com

Scotty Cameron is an American sports equipment brand established by Don T. "Scotty" Cameron (born 8 November 1962), a golf club manufacturer primarily known for making putters. Scotty Cameron is part of the Acushnet Company brand portfolio since 2011, when the corporation acquired it from Fortune Brands.

== Personal life ==
Cameron was born in Glendale, California. He later moved to Fountain Valley, where he grew up, attending high school in nearby Huntington Beach Edison High School. He now lives in Carlsbad, California with his wife and two daughters.

== Career and company ==
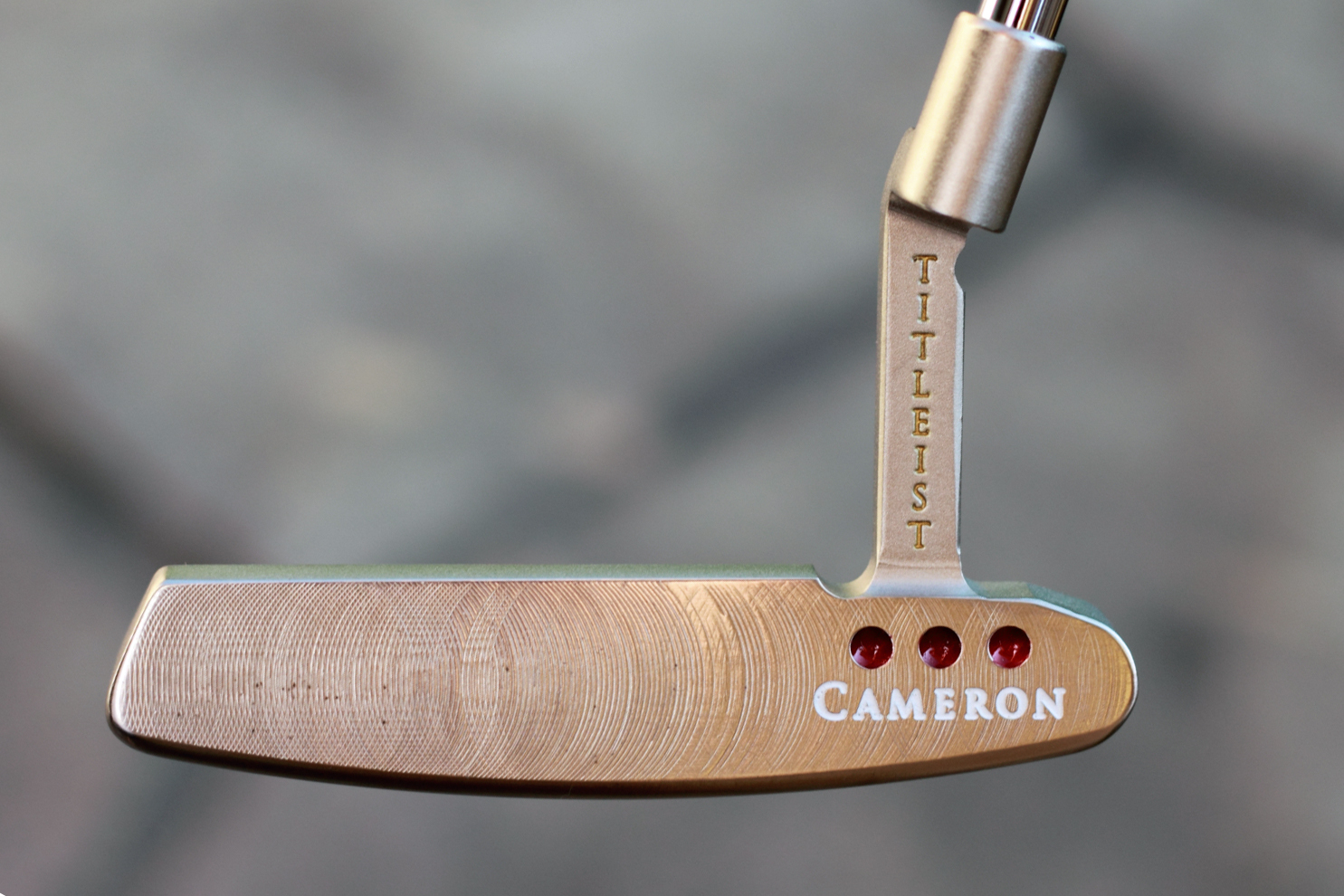
Picture of a Mil-Spec 34/340 Ver. I & II from 2015

Cameron learned how to make putters with his father in the family's garage at an early age.

During the mid-1990s, a number of CNC milling facilities around the country, including X-Cel Technologies in Chicago, provided milling services for Scotty Cameron.

In 1991, Cameron designed and manufactured putters and worked directly with select golf equipment manufacturers, including Maxfli, Ray Cook Golf Company and Cleveland Golf. During the same year, he manufactured his first retail production putter, nicknamed the Fry's Pity Putter. Later that year, Cameron began producing putters exclusively for Mizuno.

In late 1992, Cameron and his wife, Kathy, set up Cameron Golf International and began selling the Scotty Cameron Classic line of putters. At the 1993 Masters Tournament, Bernhard Langer won using a Cameron prototype putter. The win helped to jumpstart the Camerons' new company.

In August 1994, Titleist fought off competition from five other companies to contract Cameron to make putters exclusively for the Acushnet Company. Since then, the Scotty Cameron brand has grown to be one of the leading names in golf.

In 1996, the first Scotty Cameron Putter Studio was established in San Diego's North County, where the top players in the world came to analyze and understand their putting strokes and have custom putters created by Cameron.

In 2004, the Acushnet Company expanded the Putter Studio's square footage and capabilities. Cameron and his team moved to a new research and development facility built from the ground up. The Putter Studio also houses the Custom Shop, where anyone can prepare an order online and send a Scotty Cameron putter for restoration and/or customization.

In 2007, the Scotty Cameron Museum & Gallery was opened in Japan, near Tokyo. It houses many one-of-a-kind Scotty Cameron products, putters and prototypes, including many personal artifacts.

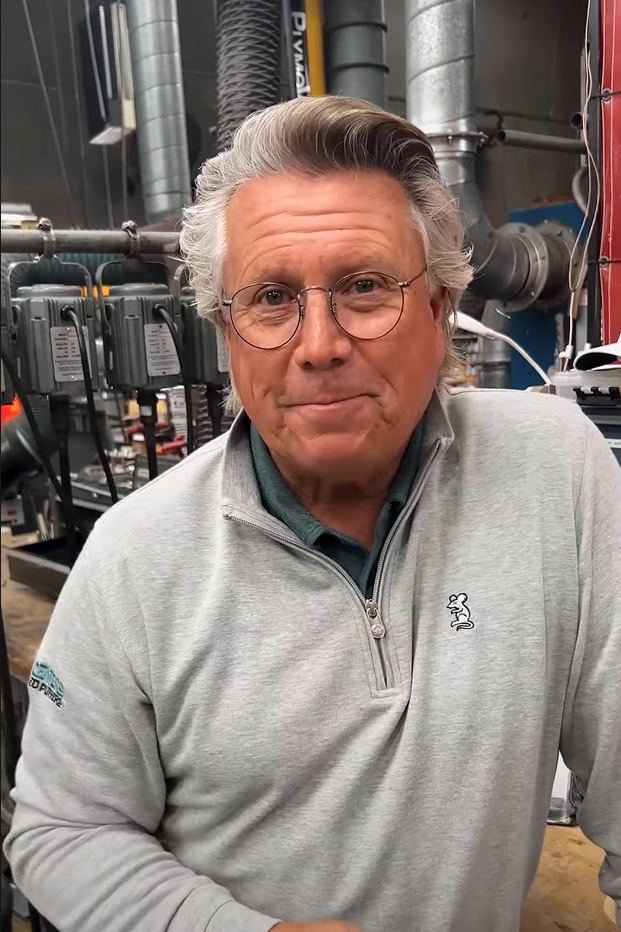
Scotty Cameron in 2024.

On May 20, 2011, Fortune Brands, Inc. announced an agreement for the sale of its Acushnet Company golf business, including the Scotty Cameron brand, to a group led by Fila Korea Ltd., for $1.225 billion in cash. According to Gene Yoon, chairman of Fila Korea, the acquisition provides them with well-known brands to sell in emerging markets in Asia.

In July 2014, the Scotty Cameron Golf Gallery opened in Encinitas, CA serving as a brick-and-mortar retail space featuring unique putters, branded merchandise and the first-ever official Scotty Cameron putter fitting facility open to the public.

Acushnet Holdings, the parent company of golf equipment brands Titleist, FootJoy and Scotty Cameron, went public on the New York Stock Exchange (NYSE) on October 28, 2016, trading under the symbol 'GOLF'.

== Tiger Woods ==
Tiger Woods used one specific Scotty Cameron putter for the majority of his career and during 14 of his 15 major championships (he used a different Scotty Cameron putter in his 1997 Masters victory). It is made of 303 German Stainless Steel. It has a single sight dot and a red "cherry dot" on both the face and in the back cavity. The putter has a blank sole and has "Tiger" on the left bumper and "Woods" on the right bumper. Woods uses a Ping grip on his putter. He had used a Scotty Cameron putter for all of his professional golf victories up to December 2011. His most used Scotty Cameron putter was first put into play May 1999 at the GTE Byron Nelson Classic-Where he shot 61 in his first round with the putter. This historic putter possibly was originally milled by Robert Bettinardi, as were most Scotty Cameron putters from 1992 to 1998/9

In 2010, Woods switched from the putter he had been using since 1999 to a Nike Method 001 putter. This change was not without controversy, and Woods spent almost a year experimenting with different Nike models before settling on a configuration he liked.

In 2016, at the Hero World Challenge, Woods went back to his Scotty Cameron putter after not playing a tournament in 16 months. He said the putter went back into his bag the day after Nike announced their exit from the golf equipment business. It is the same putter that he used to win 14 of his 15 majors.

In 2019, Tiger Woods used this putter to capture his 15th Major.
