= Barney Adams =

American businessman

Byron (Barney) H. Adams (born March 24, 1939, in Syracuse, New York), is an entrepreneur, the founder of Adams Golf, inventor of the Tight Lies fairway wood, holder of several patents on golf products, author of The WOW Factor, and proponent of growing the game of golf.

== Biography ==
Adams began playing golf at 14, caddying at Onondaga Country Club in Fayetteville, New York. Adams attended Clarkson College, now Clarkson University, on an athletic scholarship. He joined Sigma Delta, a local fraternity, and graduated in 1962 with a Business Management (BBA) degree. In 2012 Adams was inducted into the Sports Hall of Fame at Clarkson University.

After graduation, Adams worked for Corning Glass in various engineering positions, and then entered the supermarket industry in Southern California as an independent sales representative. He then joined a Silicon Valley startup making microprocessors to reduce retail energy usage. In 1983 Adams joined Dave Pelz Golf in Abilene, Texas.

== Adams Golf ==
When Dave Pelz Golf Golf Inc. went bankrupt, Adams bought the assets and started Adams Golf. Initially specializing in custom fitted golf clubs, the company rapidly expanded after the creation of the Adams Tight Lies fairway wood. In 1998 Adams Golf went public with an initial public offering underwritten by Lehman Brothers. Adams was selected as Manufacturing Entrepreneur of the Year by Ernst & Young in 1999. The 2010 Ernie Sabayrac Award for lifetime contribution to the golf industry was presented to Adams by the PGA of America. Adams has also been named an Honorary Member for Life by the PGA Southern California Section, Desert Chapter. Adams served as Chairman of the Board of Adams Golf until June 2012 when the company was purchased by TaylorMade-Adidas.

== The WOW Factor ==
Adams book, The WOW Factor, is an insiders look at the golf industry and offers business advice to entrepreneurs. Adams continues to be an avid golfer, but now mainly pursues his hobby, saltwater fly fishing.

== Initiatives and awards ==
Since retirement Adams continues to write about golf including regular contributions to GolfWRx. A 2011 story culminated in the Tee It Forward movement, which he founded to help make the game more enjoyable by helping amateurs play from the distance that aligns with their abilities. He remains active with two charities, The Ryan Foundation benefiting MPS and Orphan Diseases, and Folds of Honor which supports military families.

In 2012 Barney Adams was inducted into the Clarkson College Hall of Fame, and in 2022 he was inducted into the Texas Golf Hall of Fame for lifetime achievement in golf. Adams also created new shaft technology in 2022, with Breakthrough Golf Technology, bringing innovation to putter shafts.
