= Ashworth (clothing) =

United States clothing brand

Ashworth Golf
- Formerly: Charter Golf, Inc.
- Type: Subsidiary
- Traded as: Nasdaq: ASHW
- Industry: Textile
- Founded: 1987; 39 years ago, in California
- Founder: Gerald Montiel and John Ashworth
- Fate: Became a brand of Adidas, then sold
- Headquarters: United States
- Area served: Global
- Products: Clothing
- Parent: YGM Group (2019-present)
- Website: ashworthgolf.com ASHWORTH UK

Ashworth is a United States clothing brand, currently owned by YGM Group since 2019. The brand is focused on a wide range of clothing such as t-shirts, polo shirts, hoodies, cardigans, sweaters, pants, jeans, shorts, jackets, coats, and gilets, among others.

== History ==
The company was founded in 1987 by Gerald Montiel and John Ashworth as Charter Golf, Inc, from an office in the Los Angeles garment district. Ashworth was a golf enthusiast and Montiel ran a sporting goods store. Montiel hired Ashworth as a buyer for the golf department in 1985.

They observed that golf fashions in the 1980s could use more style. After the sporting goods store went out of business, Ashworth started designing the clothes while Montiel raised money for his idea. Eventually he raised $685,000 by early 1988 and the company was launched as Charter Golf, Inc.

Sales started modestly, reaching $374,000 in the first year, but grew quickly, reaching $2.14M in 1989. Montiel took it public in 1990 under the symbol CGOL. Using stock grants as an incentive, they signed celebrity endorsers, starting with golf tournament pros Fred Couples, later John Cook, Scott Verplank, Mark Wiebe, Ernie Els, Dave Stockton, and CBS announcer Jim Nantz. Mr. Couples later signed a lifetime endorsement agreement, in exchange for incentive stock, in 1994.

Growth continued through a secondary offering in 1992 that raised $10.9M, helping fund expansion. That transaction valued the company at $44M on $28.8M revenues. In 1994 it formally changed the name to Ashworth, Inc. Growth was healthy until 1995, when the company suffered some growth pains due to unexpected difficulties transitioning to a new management information system (MIS). Montiel had promoted Rick Werschkul in early 1995 from COO. He resigned early 1996, possibly over problems with an MIS implementation that caused problems meeting orders. Montiel took over management until late 1996 when he hired Randy Herrel from Quiksilver, Inc.

Herrel rejuvenated the company's operations and product line, getting it back on a growth trajectory. From $2.1M in 1989, they reached $74.5M by 1995, stalling in 1995–1996, then growing again to $89M in 1998.

John Ashworth left the company in 1997, citing "philosophical differences." His sister, an English teacher in San Marcos, continued to introduce herself as the sister to John to new students. He later joined Quiksilver, Inc. in 2001 after expiration of his non-compete agreement to start a competing line of Golf apparel called Fidra. Gerald Montiel retired from the company end of 1998.

The company continued to perform well under CEO Randy Herrel's leadership. In 2001, it entered a licensing agreement with Callaway Golf Company to design, market, and distribute a line of apparel under the Callaway name. Sales reached $173M in 2004 and $204M in 2005. However, competitive pressures stalled revenues at that point, and the company posted its first loss since going public in 1990. CEO Randy Herrel resigned in early 2006, and the company started a search for a new CEO and chairman. Meanwhile, in 2006 revenue only reached $210M with profits under $1M, and in 2007 revenues fell to $202M and profits to a $14M loss.

They hired Allan Fletcher, founder of Fletcher Leisure Group, a Canadian Golf apparel company and Ashworth partner, in late 2007. However, his tenure as head of an independent company only lasted until late 2008. On Oct 13, 2008, TaylorMade (an Adidas subsidiary by then) agreed to acquire Ashworth for $72.8M, including $46.3M in debt, giving the transaction a value of $26.5M to shareholders. In May 2017, it was announced that Adidas sold its golf brands to KPS Capital Partners. On September 9, 2019, Ashworth was acquired by YGM Trading Limited.

== Target market ==
Ashworth focuses on both modern and traditional clothing geared towards use on the course.

== Sponsorships ==
They currently sponsor Fred Couples. Justin Rose, Sean O'Hair, Justin Leonard, Ryan Palmer, Rory Sabbatini, and Johnson Wagner, and Dave Cowden, Jr. as brand ambassadors.
