= Philip E. Young =

American businessman (1885–1955)

Philip Endicott "Skipper" Young (December 1, 1885 – June 17, 1955) was an American businessman who founded Titleist, a brand of golf equipment.

== Early life ==
Young was born on December 1, 1885, in Dorchester, Massachusetts, to Rev. George H. Young, a Unitarian minister, and his second wife, Elizabeth, the daughter of Augustus Bradford Endicott. He had two sisters, Eleanor Guild and Shelia Young. (Note: According to family lore, Young's grandfather was a horse thief.) The family moved to Dedham, Massachusetts, when Young was a child. After being graduated from Dedham High School in 1905, Young earned a degree in mechanical engineering from the Massachusetts Institute of Technology (MIT) with the class of 1909.

== Career ==
Early in his career, Young worked for Goodyear. In 1910, he started the Acushnet Company with the financial backing of Allen Weeks, a fraternity brother from MIT.

When playing a round of golf with his dentist, Young missed a putt. Surprised, Young believed the miss was caused by the weight of the ball and asked his dentist friend to x-ray the ball. The x-rays confirmed his suspicions that the rubber core was off-center. Young took x-rays of more golf balls and found similar results. The off-center cores made the balls prone to erratic shots. He then developed a way to create golf balls with perfect cores. Young founded Titleist in 1932 as a subsidiary of the Acushnet Company.

== Personal life and death ==
With his wife, Edith (née Ames), Young had a son, Richard, born in 1916, and a daughter, Edith, born in 1911. (Note: Young's daughter later married David H. Harris.) Edith grew up about a half a mile away from Young. They both attended the Dedham Public Schools and were childhood sweethearts. The couple was married in 1910.

Young lived at 8 Fort St. in Fairhaven and spent his winters in Coral Gables, Florida. He was a member of the Wamsutta Club and New Bedford Country Club in Massachusetts, and the Riviera Club in Florida. He was also an avid sailor.

On June 17, 1955, Young died due to a heart condition at St. Luke's Hospital in New Bedford. He was 69.
