= MGM Resorts Championship =

Golf tournament

Tournament information
- Location: Las Vegas, Nevada
- Established: 2021
- Courses: Las Vegas Paiute Golf Resort (Sun Mountain Course)
- Par: 72
- Length: 7,112 yards (6,503 m)
- Tour: Korn Ferry Tour
- Format: Stroke play
- Prize fund: US$600,000
- Month played: April
- Final year: 2021

Tournament record score
- Aggregate: 272 Peter Uihlein (2021)
- To par: −16 as above

Final champion
- (United States) Peter Uihlein

Location map
- Location in the United States Location in Nevada

The MGM Resorts Championship at Paiute is a golf tournament on the Korn Ferry Tour. It was first played in April 2021 on the Sun Mountain Course at Las Vegas Paiute Golf Resort near Las Vegas, Nevada.

== Winners ==
Year	Winner	Score	To par	Margin of victory	Runners-up
2021	(United States) Peter Uihlein	272	−16	4 strokes	(United States) David Lipsky (United States) Jamie Lovemark
