= Gary Adams (golf) =

Golf inventor

- Born: Gary Vale Adams; July 24, 1943
- Died: January 2, 2000 (aged 56); Carlsbad, California, U.S.
- Occupations: Founder TaylorMade, Founder McHenry Metals, Founder Founders Club

Gary Adams (July 24, 1943 - January 2, 2000) was an American salesman, founder of TaylorMade Golf, Founders Club, McHenry Metals, and nominal inventor of the modern "metal wood".

After leaving college, he started working as a golf salesman. He observed new golf balls worked well with irons, but not wood clubs, so he started tinkering to create a metal driver. In 1979, Gary Adams borrowed $24,000 on his house and leased a 6,000 square foot building in McHenry, Illinois, to found TaylorMade Golf. He originally had three employees and sold only one item, his newly invented 12-degree loft metalwood.

He was awarded the National Golf Association man of the year in 1984. He was awarded the PGA Ernie Sabayrac award in 1995 for his contribution to golf.
