= Adams Golf =

American golf club manufacturer

Adams Golf, Inc.
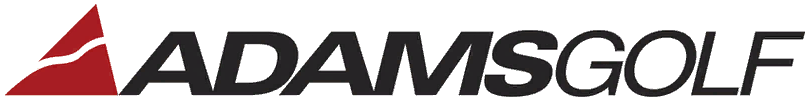
- Type: Private
- Traded as: Nasdaq: ADGF
- Industry: Sports equipment
- Founded: 1991; 35 years ago
- Founder: Barney Adams
- Defunct: 2012
- Fate: Acquired by TaylorMade in 2012, becoming a brand of the Adidas Group
- Headquarters: Plano, Texas (Closed), U.S.
- Area served: Worldwide
- Products: Golf clubs
- Website: www.adamsgolf.com

Adams (brand)
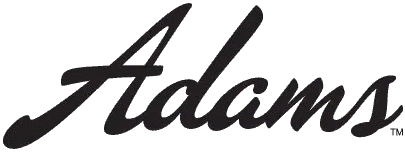
- Product type: Golf clubs
- Current owner: TaylorMade
- Produced by: TaylorMade
- Introduced: 2012
- Markets: Sports equipment
- Previous owners: Adidas, Private

Adams Golf, Inc. is an American sports equipment manufacturing company based in Plano, Texas, focused on the golf equipment market. The company produced golf equipment (more specifically clubs). In 2012 it was acquired by TaylorMade, becoming one of its brands.

== History ==
In 1983, Barney Adams joined Dave Pelz Golf in Abilene, Texas. When Pelz's Preceptor Golf went bankrupt in 1988, Adams bought the assets and started Adams Golf. He moved the company to Dallas in 1991.

Adams Golf initially specialized in custom fitted golf clubs, initially becoming associated with Hank Haney setting up a club fitting and repair shop at the Hank Haney Golf Ranch.

Adams "Tight Lies" fairway wood became a commercial success as the result of television infomercial, with sportscaster Jack Whittaker as the host and narrator; Haney, then Tiger Woods' coach; Bill Rogers, The Open Champsionship winner and PGA Player of the Year in 1981; and LPGA Hall of Famer Carol Mann, as spokespersons.

In 1998, Adams Golf went public on Wall Street, with an initial public offering underwritten by Lehman Brothers. Barney Adams was selected as Manufacturing Entrepreneur of the Year by Ernst & Young in 1999. Although semi-retired since 2000, Barney Adams retains the title Chairman of the Board until 2012.

In 2012, Adams Golf was acquired by TaylorMade Golf (which was owned by Adidas by then) for USD 10.80 per share in cash (roughly 70 million). As a result, Adams was added to the corporation set of golf brands, such as Adidas Golf and TaylorMade–adidas Golf. TaylorMade assured that Adams' headquarters in Plano, Texas, would remain. Nevertheless, by 2016 the Adams brand had lost market position, with some media considering it "an afterthought" at TaylorMade.

In 2020, after a 5-year hiatus from releasing new models, Adams released their Tight Lies series, a one-off line of fairway woods and hybrids.

In 2023, Adams Golf released a fully redesigned golf line. Including a full range of newly designed clubs and gear along with a full rebrand of logos, colors and marketing.

== Sponsorships ==
Adams Golf has maintained endorsement deals with many professional golfers playing on the leading tours, including Bernhard Langer, Brittany Lincicome, Yani Tseng and Tom Watson.
