= Acushnet Company =

American manufacturer of golf equipment and accessories

- Type: Public subsidiary
- Traded as: NYSE: GOLF; Russell 2000 Component; S&P 600 component
- Industry: Sports equipment
- Founded: 1910; 116 years ago
- Founder: Philip E. Young
- Headquarters: Fairhaven, Massachusetts, U.S.
- Area served: United States
- Key people: David Maher (president and CEO)
- Products: Golf equipment, clothing, accessories
- Number of employees: c. 3,000
- Parent: Misto Holdings (50%)
- Subsidiaries: FootJoy; Scotty Cameron; Pinnacle; Titleist; Vokey Design
- Website: acushnetgolf.com

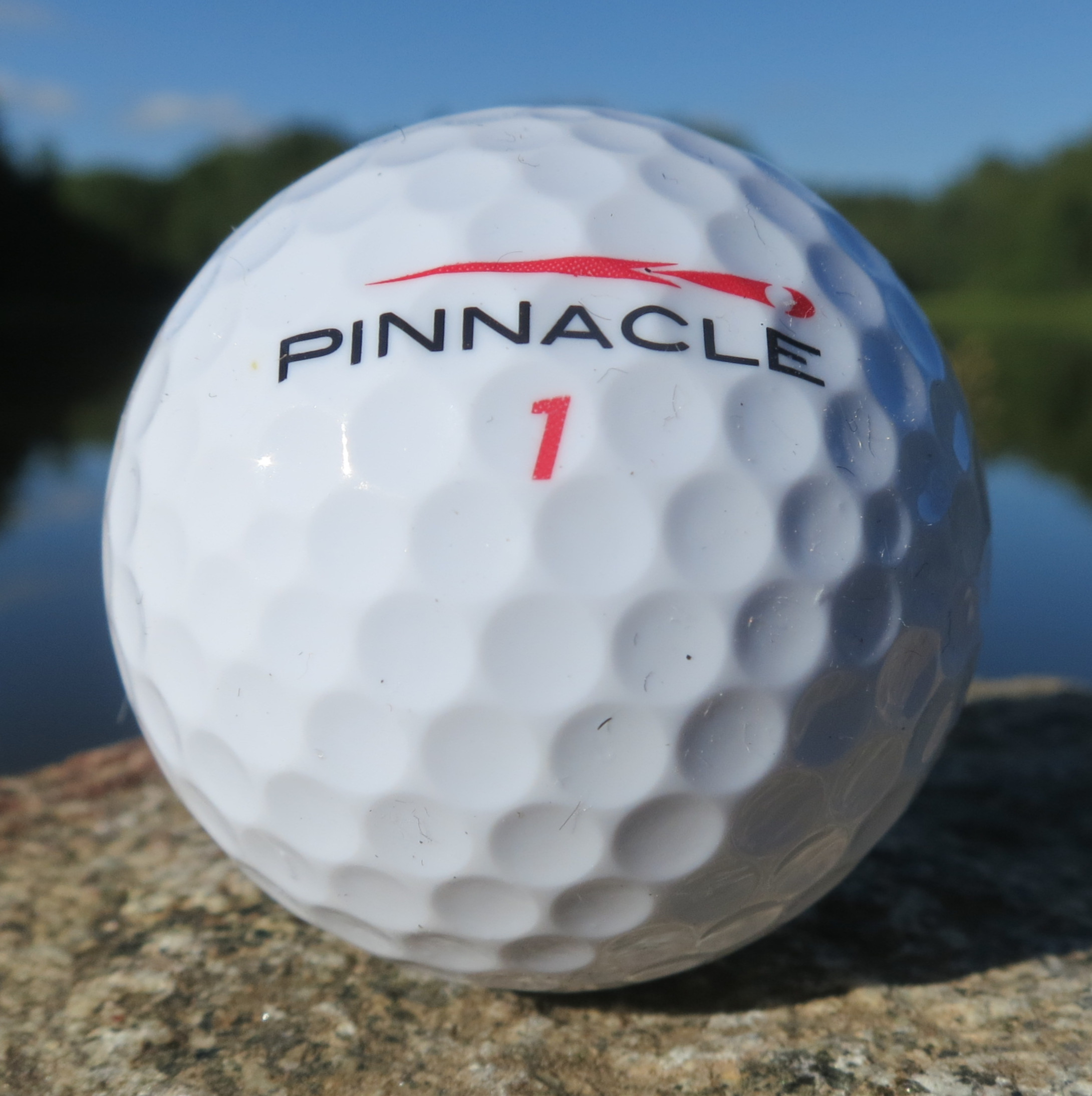
2010s distance golf ball by Acushnet Company's brand Pinnacle.

The Acushnet Company is an American company focused on the golf market. The company operates a series of brands that manufacture golf equipment, clothing and accessories.

The principal brands operated by Acushnet are Titleist, best known for balls and clubs; FootJoy, an apparel brand with particular focus on shoes and gloves; Scotty Cameron, a leading putter brand; Vokey Design, a leading brand of wedge; Union Green, a golf ball and accessory brand marketed to casual players; and Pinnacle, a brand of distance ball.

== History ==
Founded in Acushnet, Massachusetts, by Philip E. "Skipper" Young in 1910, the "Acushnet Process Company" focused on deresinating latex and supplying rubber to industry, and over time began to make their own rubber-based products including water bottles and bathing caps. Eventually, Acushnet Process became a manufacturer of golf equipment, principally, golf balls.

In 1932, the company sectioned into two divisions: Rubber and Golf, both of which became quite successful. Three years later, the Golf division produced the Titleist golf ball, which has consistently been the company's most successful product.

In 1976, the company was purchased by American Brands (now known as Fortune Brands). In 1995, Fortune sold off the Acushnet Company's Acushnet Rubber division, which was Acushnet's original business (circa early 1900s).

Fortune Brands announced on December 8, 2010, that it planned to focus on its liquor business, and would spin off or sell other parts of the company — including home furnishings and hardware, and Acushnet (which includes Titleist, FootJoy, Scotty Cameron, and other golf product brands). On May 20, 2011, it was announced that a Korean group associated with Fila Korea, Ltd. and Mirae Asset Private Equity would purchase Acushnet for $1.23 billion in cash. The deal was completed on July 29, 2011.

On October 28, 2016, Acushnet was listed on the New York Stock Exchange via an initial public offering. In August 2018, Fila Korea acquired a controlling stake with the purchase of an additional 20% from several other investors, including Mirae Asset, to take their holdings to 53.1%.

== Operations ==
Acushnet employs roughly 3000 people in Massachusetts, making it one of the largest employers in the region. It is headquartered in Fairhaven, Massachusetts alongside its Packing and Distribution Center about three miles (five kilometers) south of its original location.

They also have two golf ball manufacturing plants and an R&D Technology Center located in the New Bedford Industrial Park, as well as a Custom Golf Ball plant located in New Bedford.

Acushnet currently operates several facilities, many of which are in Massachusetts, as follows:

- Ball Plant 2: Acushnet Company, 256 Samuel Barnett Boulevard, North Dartmouth, MA 02747
- Ball Plant 3: Acushnet Company, 215 Duchaine Boulevard, New Bedford, MA 02746
- Ball Plant C: Acushnet Company, 700 Belleville Avenue, New Bedford, MA 02746
- Ball Plant 4: Acushnet Titleist (Thailand) Ltd. Hemaraj Eastern Seaboard Industrial Estate/Free Zone, 500/40 Moo 3 Tambon Tasit, Amphur Pluakdaeng, Rayong 21140
- Distribution: Acushnet Company, 333 Bridge Street, Fairhaven, MA 02719
- R&D Center: Acushnet Company, 181 Samuel Barnett Boulevard, North Dartmouth, MA 02747

== Brands ==
Acushnet Company's primary brands are FootJoy, Scotty Cameron, Titleist and Vokey.

=== FootJoy ===
FootJoy is a golf clothing company based in Massachusetts and founded in 1857. Footjoy was acquired by the Acushnet Company in 1985 from General Mills. Currently, FootJoy is the number one seller of golf shoes and gloves in the United States.

FootJoy products include athletic shoes, golf gloves, clothing (shirts, shorts, pants, socks, sweater, jackets, hoodies,), and accessories (bags, gloves, caps, umbrellas).

=== Scotty Cameron ===
Scotty Cameron is a golf club designer who specializes in high-end putters. Cameron currently resides and has based his company, Scotty Cameron, in California. Cameron made his first putters using his mother-in-law's garage as his factory. After working with several golf companies, Scotty would accept a deal with Titleist. Later, Cameron created a "Custom Shop" where users and collectors can customize their putter by ordering a custom paint fill, engraving, shaft band and grip along with other options. Players can also bring in their older Scotty Cameron Putter and have them repaired.

Cameron's putters, the most storied of which are inspired by Karsten Solheim's (PING) original designs (Anser, Zing, B60) are named after popular California beach towns (Newport Beach, Laguna Beach) and Northern California counties renowned for their golf, wine, and leisure tourism (Sonoma, Napa, Monterey). His original designs, usually mallet putters, are often named using ad hoc wordplay. Cameron is a master of prestige branding, going so far as to trademark (under the Acushnet name) the acronym "G.S.S." or German stainless steel. "G.S.S." is simply 303 stainless imported from Germany and used in Cameron's more exclusive releases. It is molecularly identical to other 303 steels.

=== Titleist ===
Established by Phillip E. "Skipper" Young, a graduate of Massachusetts Institute of Technology in 1932, the brand is focused on golf balls and golf clubs. The Titleist balls have been produced by Acushnet since 1935.

Titleist's balls were also the most used balls at the 1949 U.S. Open.

=== Vokey Design ===
The Vokey brand was established by Bob Vokey (b. 1939), a Canadian craftsman who left his home country to establish in the U.S. As his attempts as a golfer failed, Vokey started manufacturing golf clubs.
