= Gene Yoon =

South Korean businessman and investor (born 1945)

Gene Yoonsoo Yoon
- Yoon Yoon-su
- Born: September 9, 1945 (age 80); Hwaseong, Gyeonggi, South Korea
- Education: Seoul High School (1964), and Hankuk University of Foreign Studies Department of Political Science & Diplomacy (1974)
- Occupations: Businessman; investor

- Gene Yoon
- Hangul: 윤윤수
- Hanja: 尹潤洙
- RR: Yun Yunsu
- MR: Yun Yunsu

Yoon Yoon-su, commonly known in English as Gene Yoon (Korean: 윤윤수; Hwaseong, 9 September 1945) is a South Korean businessman and investor. He is the current chairman of the sportswear company Fila.

== Biography ==
Yoon graduated from Seoul High School in 1964, and Hankuk University of Foreign Studies Department of Political Science & Diplomacy in 1974. He started his career with Korea Shipping Corporation (KSC) before working in merchandising from JC Penney October 1975 to July 1981. He then worked for Hwasung Co., Ltd. till March 1984 as export director, then becoming chairman of Care Line Corp. From June 1991 until the present he has been the Chairman and CEO of Fila Korea Ltd., organising a buyout of Fila brand in 2007. While retaining his position as Fila Korea Ltd's foremost chief executive, Yoon has also parlayed his executive retail career by branching out into formal business ownership. The participation of investing his own money through his buyout venture resulted him in becoming an equity partner in his first investment enterprise after acquiring a stake in Fila that was estimated to be worth approximately $US830 million in 2019.

He is also currently executive vice chairman of Korea International Trade Association.

== Book ==
- The Reason Why I Get 180 million Won Per Year (내가 연봉 18억원을 받는 이유) (autobiography published in 1997).
