= Fila =

Italian sportswear brand

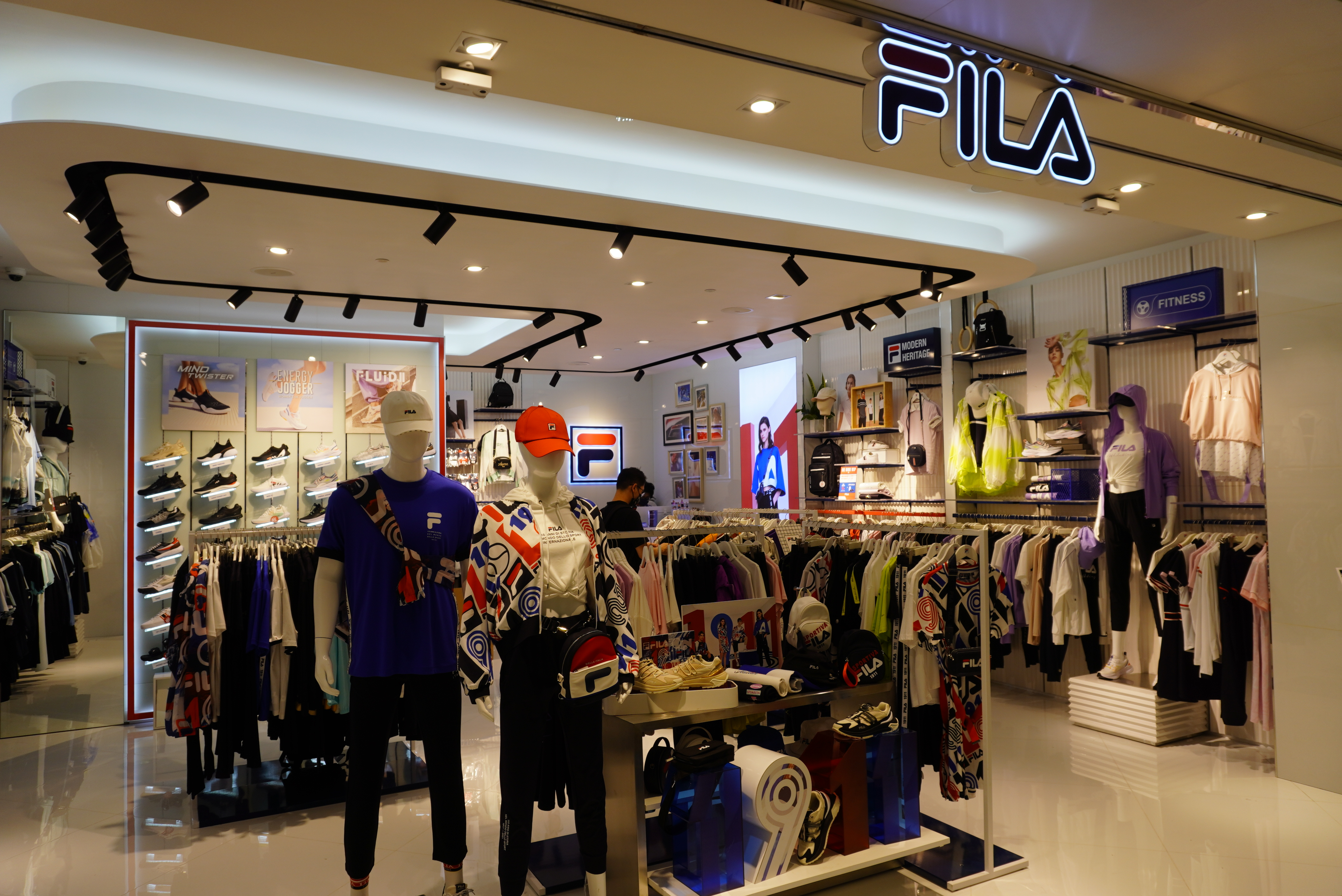
- Fila store in Hong Kong
- Type: Division
- Founded: 1911; 115 years ago in Coggiola, Italy
- Founder: Ettore Fila; Giansevero Fila
- Headquarters: Seoul, South Korea
- Area served: Worldwide
- Key people: Gene Yoon (chairman)
- Products: Athletic shoes and clothing, sports equipment
- Parent: Misto Holdings
- Website: www.fila.com

Fila (/ˈfiːlə/ FEE-lə) is a sportswear brand headquartered in Seoul and owned by Misto Holdings. The company was founded by brothers Ettore and Giansevero Fila in 1911 in Coggiola, Italy. Fila Korea acquired the brand in 2007 and launched its initial public offering (IPO) on the Korea Exchange in September 2010. Fila's current chief executive officer is Yoon Keun-chang.

== History ==
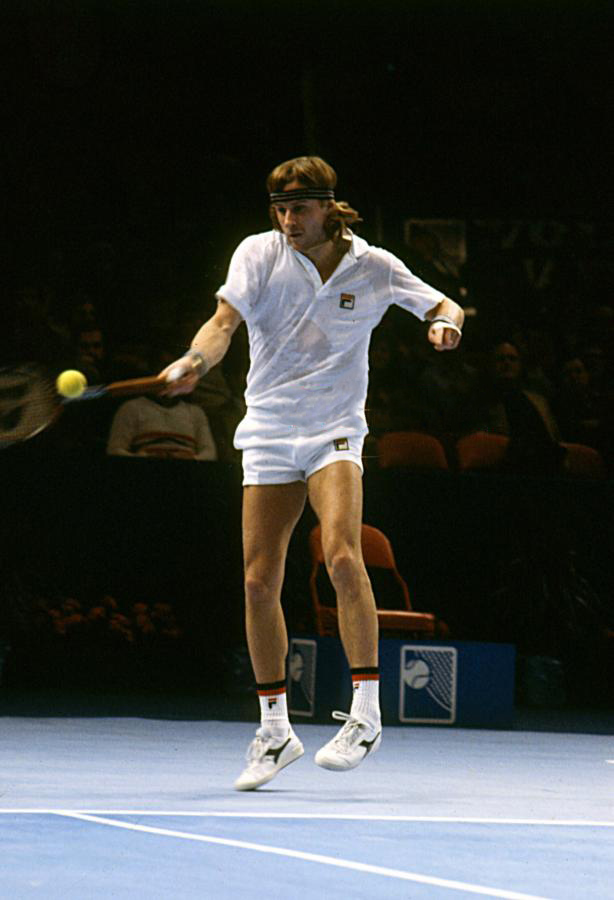
Björn Borg in 1981

In 1906, brothers Ettore and Giansevero Fila joined the Giuseppe Regis and Figli di Coggiola wool mill in Biella, Piedmont, Italy. In 1911, the Regis brothers withdrew from the company and the wool mill took the name Fratelli Fila S.p.A. Fila was officially established in 1923. It originally made clothing for the people of the Italian Alps, primarily underwear. In 1973, it moved into sportswear, with an endorsement deal with tennis player Björn Borg, and the brand became more popular after the transition.

In 1988, Fila changed ownership from Italian chemical company SNIA S.p.A. to Fiat-controlled holding company Gemina, later restructured as Holding di Partecipazioni in 1997. In 1991, Fila shifted focus from clothing in Europe to footwear in the US, and completed a buyout of its US license. High-profile sponsorships, including basketball players Grant Hill and Jerry Stackhouse, helped make Fila America's fastest-growing footwear brand by 1995.

In 2003, Holding di Partecipazioni sold the company to Cerberus Capital Management, a US-based hedge fund, after the company over-committed itself to expensive athletic endorsements at a time when margins were under pressure. Cerberus owned Fila through holding company Sports Brands International, which owned and operated all Fila businesses around the world with the exception of Fila Korea, which was a separate company operating the brand under license. In January 2007, the brand and all its international subsidiaries were acquired by Fila Korea.

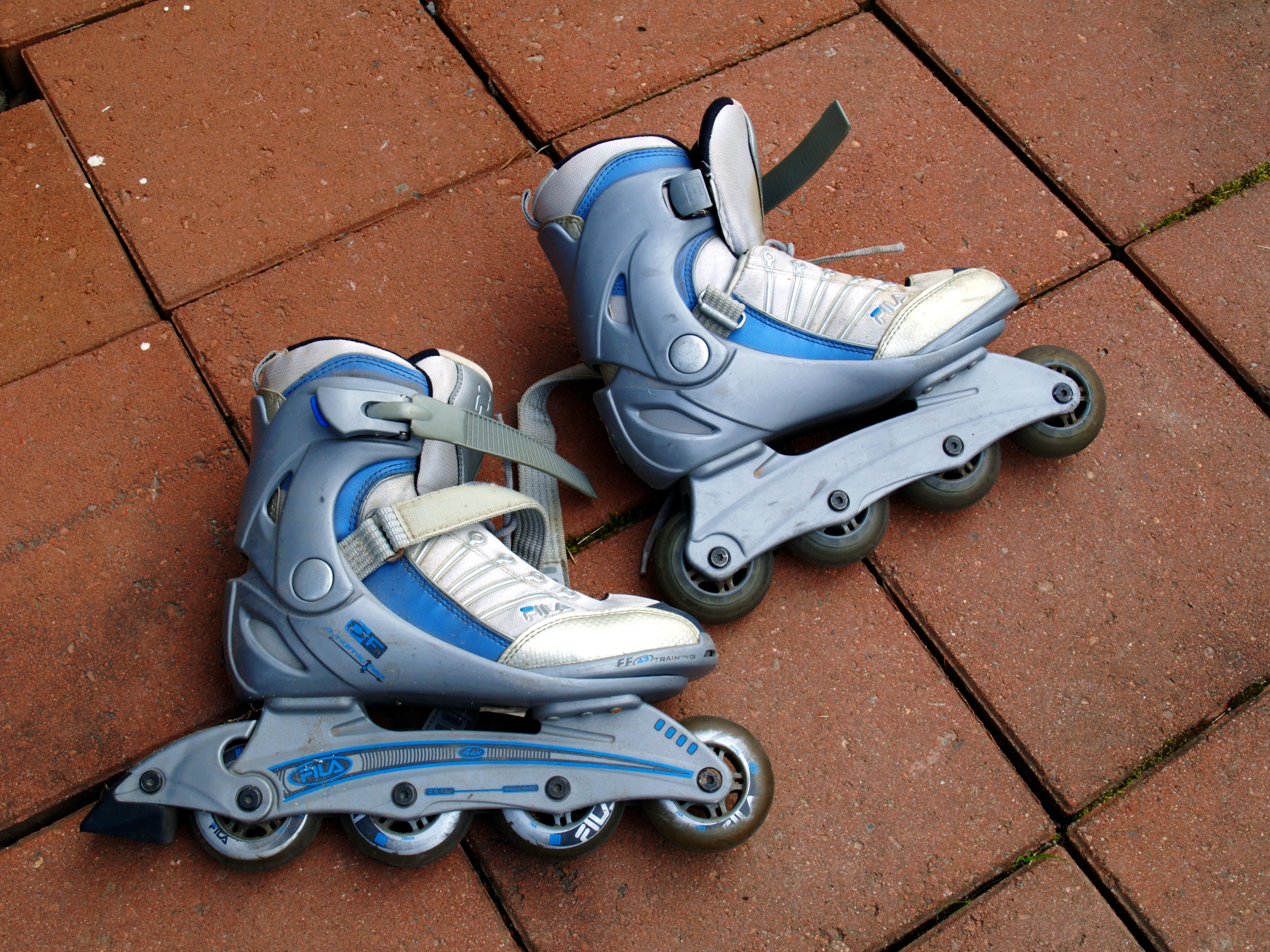
Fila brand inline skates

In 2009, Anta Sports acquired the rights to the brand in mainland China, Hong Kong, and Macao from then Fila company's Chinese joint venture partner Belle International. Fila Korea still owned 15% shares of the joint venture company "Full Prospect".

In September 2010, Fila Korea Ltd. launched its initial public offering on the Korea Exchange. In May 2011, it acquired global golf equipment maker Acushnet Company, becoming the new owner of golf brands such as Titleist and FootJoy, for $1.23 billion.

== Sourcing concerns ==
In March 2021, Fila China stated that it would continue to source cotton from Xinjiang despite public criticism that such cotton had been produced with forced Uyghur labor in the region.

== See also ==
- List of sporting goods manufacturers
