= TaylorMade =

American sports equipment company

- Type: Subsidiary
- Industry: Sports equipment, textile
- Founded: 1979; 47 years ago in McHenry, Illinois
- Founder: Gary Adams
- Headquarters: Carlsbad, California, U.S.
- Key people: David Abeles (CEO)
- Products: Golf clubs, balls, clothing
- Parent: Centroid Investment Partners
- Website: www.taylormadegolf.com

2013 golf ball by TaylorMade.

TaylorMade Golf Company is an American sports equipment manufacturing company based in Carlsbad, California, United States. The company focuses on the golf equipment market, producing golf clubs, balls, and clothing. TaylorMade Golf is currently a subsidiary of Centroid Investment Partners after it was purchased from KPS Capital Partners in May 2021.

TaylorMade's initial success came with the innovation of metal drivers, which debuted in 1979 and have subsequently dominated the golf market. In September 2012, Outside magazine named TaylorMade one of America's "Best Places to Work".

== History ==
=== Origins in Illinois ===
TaylorMade incorporated in 1979 after Gary Adams borrowed $24,000 on his house and leased a 6,000 square foot building in McHenry, Illinois. He originally had three employees and sold only one item, his newly invented 12-degree loft metalwood. The metalwood was unique in its steel construction - replacing persimmon as the primary material from which modern drivers are manufactured - and adopted the nickname "Pittsburgh Persimmon".

Starting with $47,000 in sales in 1979, the company eventually reached its first billion dollars in revenue in 2006, marking only the second time in history that a golf brand had achieved this milestone.

=== Purchase by Salomon Group (1984) ===
TaylorMade was independently owned until 1984, when Salomon S.A. acquired the company. At the time, the union was strategically compatible for both companies which were innovators in their industries: Salomon wanted to diversify and made the decision to enter a "three-season" market, and TaylorMade benefited from the worldwide resources of Salomon. This ownership maintained until Adidas bought Salomon in 1997.

=== Sale to Adidas (1997) ===
Shortly after the Adidas acquisition, the image and focus of TaylorMade were redirected to take over the driver market; the company succeeded in achieving this goal in late 2005, when it officially became the top driver in golf. TaylorMade bought golf clothing companies Ashworth in 2008 and Adams Golf in 2012 but sold them to KPS Capital Partners in 2017.

=== Sale to KPS Capital Partners (2017) ===
In 2017 it was announced that Tiger Woods and Rory McIlroy had signed with TaylorMade after Nike's golf division closed.

On May 10, 2017 it was announced that KPS Capital Partners acquired TaylorMade for US$425 million. The deal was completed in November 2017.

Days after the deal was completed, TaylorMade released a statement to say it had parted company with Sergio García, who had been with the brand for 15 years.

=== Sale to Centroid Investment Partners (2022) ===
On February 3, 2022, The New York Times reported that KPS had hired Morgan Stanley to run a sale of TaylorMade with a value estimated around US$2 billion.

On May 11, 2022, Centroid Investment Partners - a Korean private equity firm - signed a definitive agreement to purchase TaylorMade from KPS.

=== Sun Day Red (2024) ===
On February 12, 2024, TaylorMade partnered with Tiger Woods to launch the golfer's apparel line, Sun Day Red. As of January 7, 2025, the tiger logos for Sun Day Red have been challenged by Tigeraire and Puma. Both oppositions were filed with Trademark Trial and Appeal Board; however, the Tigeraire case has been suspended pending federal litigation.

== Parent companies ==
- Salomon Group (1984–1997)
- Adidas (1997–2017)
- KPS Capital Partners (2017–2022)
- Centroid Investment Partners (2022–present)

== Endorsements ==
As with most golf equipment companies, TaylorMade maintain endorsement deals with many professional golfers on the leading tours, including past world number ones such as Tiger Woods, Rory McIlroy, and Scottie Scheffler. Most contracted players will have the majority, if not all, of their playing equipment supplied by the company, including Collin Morikawa, Tommy Fleetwood, Nelly Korda, Brooke Henderson, Charley Hull, and Kai Trump. A few are only contracted for one item.

== See also ==
- Adams Golf
- Ashworth
