= Titleist =

American brand name of golf equipment

- Product type: Golf equipment (balls, clubs, etc.)
- Current owner: Acushnet Company
- Produced by: Acushnet
- Country: United States
- Introduced: 1932; 94 years ago
- Markets: Worldwide
- Website: titleist.com

Titleist (pronounced /ˈtaɪtəlɪst/ "title-ist") is an American brand of golf equipment produced by the Acushnet Company, headquartered in Fairhaven, Massachusetts, United States. Established in 1932 by Philip E. Young, it focuses on golf balls, such as common dominant model, the ProV1. Clubs and golf bags.

The name Titleist is derived from the word "titlist", which means "title holder".

== History ==
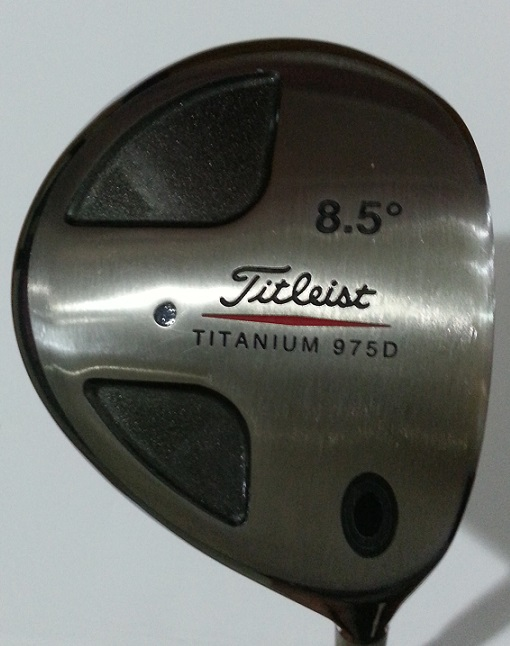
Titleist 975D driver, designed by Terry McCabe.

Philip E. Young, a graduate of Massachusetts Institute of Technology, founded Titleist in 1932. When playing a round of golf with his dentist, Young missed a sure putt that seemed to be caused by the weight distribution of the ball. He then asked his dentist friend to X-ray the ball and the film showed that the rubber core was off-center. After this initial discovery, Young took X-rays of more golf balls and found that most were poorly constructed with off-center cores and prone to erratic shots. This inspired Young to produce his own line of golf balls, which would become known as Titleist.

In 1930, Young developed a machine that could uniformly wind rubber string around a rubber core, making a "dead center" golf ball. He named the ball "Titleist," noting it was the "winner" of the quest to create the best for the game. The golf division of the Acushnet Process Company produced the Titleist golf ball in 1935, which became the company's most successful product.

In 1948, Titleist introduced "Dynamite Thread" to increase the yardage of their balls. A year later, Titleist became the most used ball at the U.S. Open Tournament.

Titleist was purchased by American Brands (later renamed to Fortune Brands) in 1976. In 1985, American Brands sold off the Acushnet Company's Acushnet Rubber division, which was Acushnet's original business (circa early 1900s).

On December 8, 2010, Fortune Brands announced that it would soon sell or spin off Titleist and some other brands. It was then announced on May 20, 2011, that a Korean group associated with Fila Korea, Ltd. and Mirae Asset Private Equity would purchase Acushnet for $1.23 billion in cash.

== Golf balls ==
=== Pro V1 ===
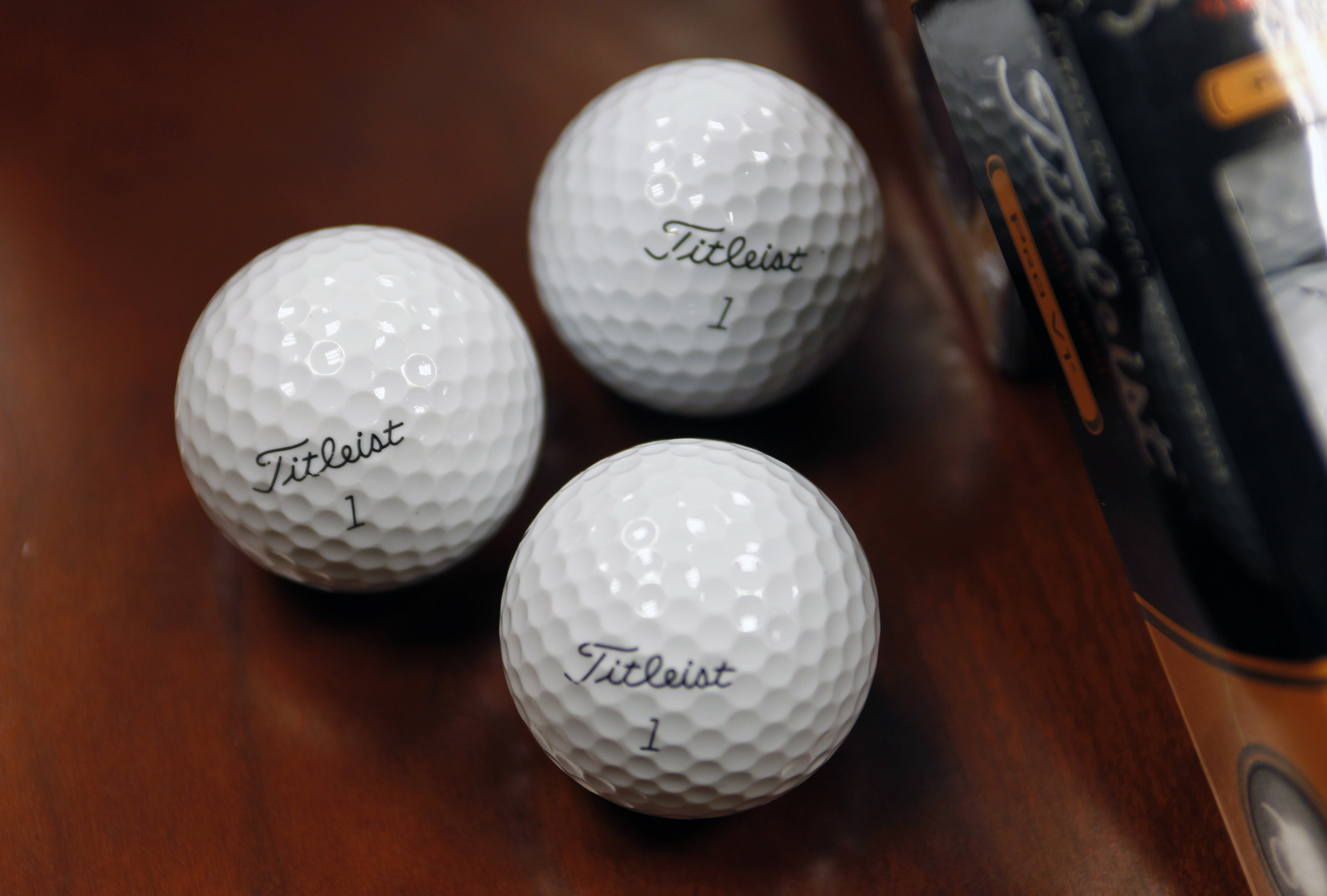
Titleist Pro V1 golf balls.

The Pro V1 ball made its debut on the PGA Tour at Las Vegas on October 11, 2000, the first week it was available to the pros. A longtime Titleist user, Billy Andrade, won that first tournament with the new ball. The Pro V1 was available to the public by December. The Pro V1 was a dramatic change in innovation for the golf ball market as a whole and for the brand, which had traditionally used a wound-ball construction (with a liquid-filled core center) for its top-of-the-line golf balls.

Shortly after its introduction the Titleist Pro V1 became the most played ball on the PGA Tour and has been for the past 20 years, picking up the most worldwide wins from both direct brand ambassadors (meaning they play Titleist equipment) and players who are not directly under contract and considered brand ambassadors from Titleist. Three years after Titleist's initial breakthrough with the Pro V1 came the Pro V1x, a ball with 60 fewer dimples. The combination of a larger firmer core, a thinner cover, and 60 fewer dimples resulted in a ball that retained the same soft feel of the Pro V1 while reducing spin and increasing distance.

In December 2007, Acushnet lost a patent infringement suit brought by Callaway. The following November, Callaway won an injunction in a Delaware court, ruling that sales of the Pro V1 golf balls must be stopped from January 1, 2009, with professionals being able to continue with their use until the end of the year. Acushnet immediately announced that they would be appealing the decision. Acushnet somewhat redesigned the Pro-V1 during the dispute. On August 14, 2009, the Court of Appeals for the Federal Circuit vacated the judgment against Acushnet and ordered a new trial. On March 29, 2010, a federal jury ruled in favor of Acushnet (Titleist), and found that the Callaway patents were invalid.

== Endorsements ==
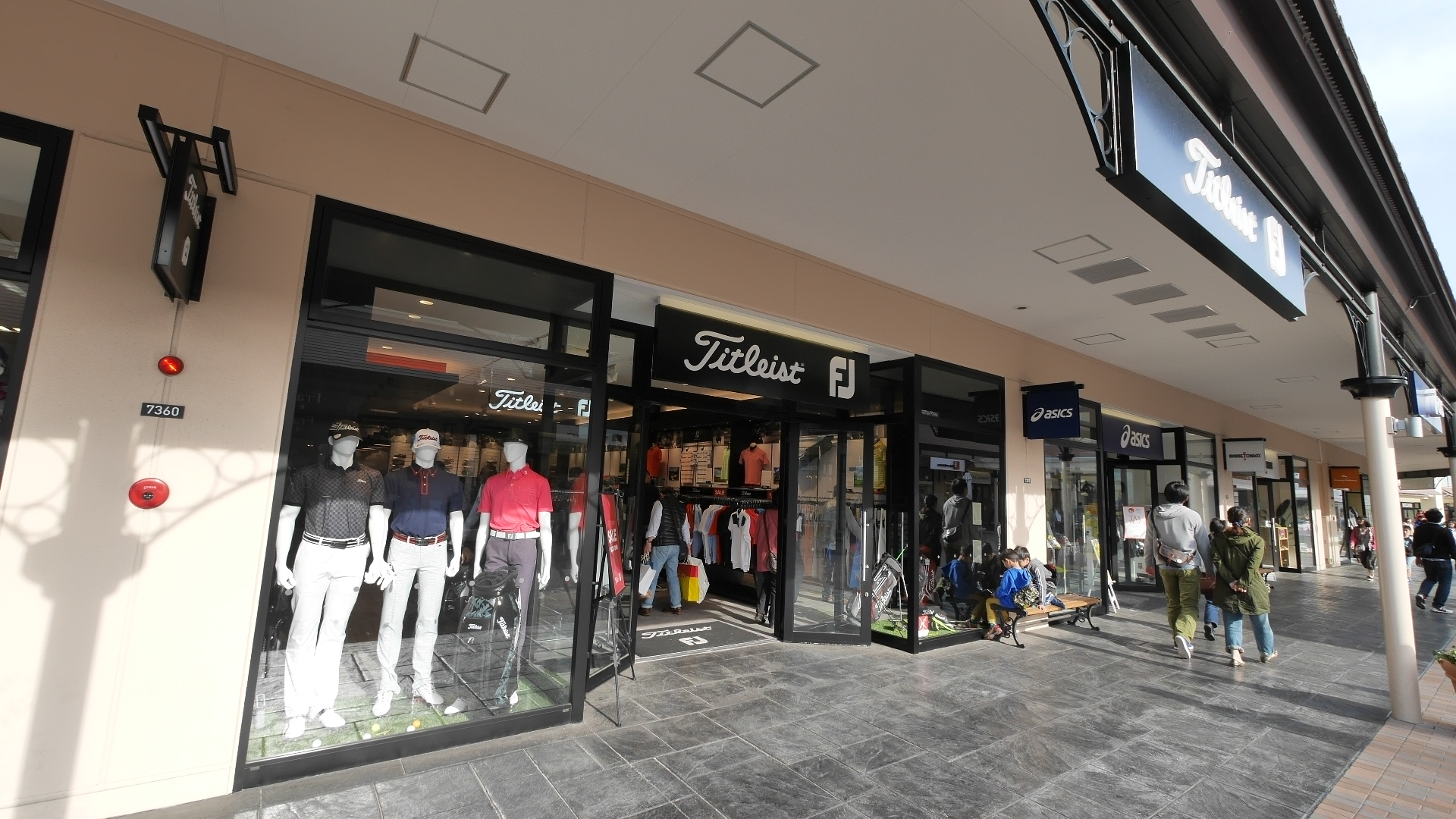
Titleist store at the Mitsui Outlet Park of Osaka, Japan, April 2015

Titleist has maintained endorsement deals with many leading professional players, including Ludvig Åberg, Billy Horschel, Robert MacIntyre, Jordan Spieth, Justin Thomas and Cameron Young

Players previously contracted with Titleist include Tiger Woods and Rory McIlroy, before both moved to Nike and then later TaylorMade, and Phil Mickelson, who switched to Callaway shortly after his 2004 Masters Tournament win.
