= Putter =

Type of golf club

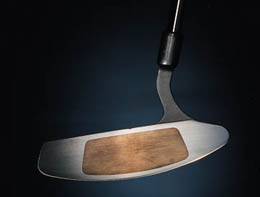
Putter with insert

A putter is a club used in the sport of golf to make relatively short and low-speed strokes with the intention of rolling the ball into the hole from a short distance away. It is differentiated from the other clubs (typically, irons and woods) by a clubhead with a very flat, low-profile, low-loft striking face, and by other features which are only allowed on putters, such as bent shafts, non-circular grips, and positional guides.

Putters are generally used from very close distances to the cup, generally on the putting green, though certain courses have fringes and roughs near the green which are also suitable for putting. While no club in a player's bag is absolutely indispensable or required to be carried by strict rules, the putter comes closest. It is a highly specialized tool for a specific job, and virtually no golfer is without one.

== Design ==
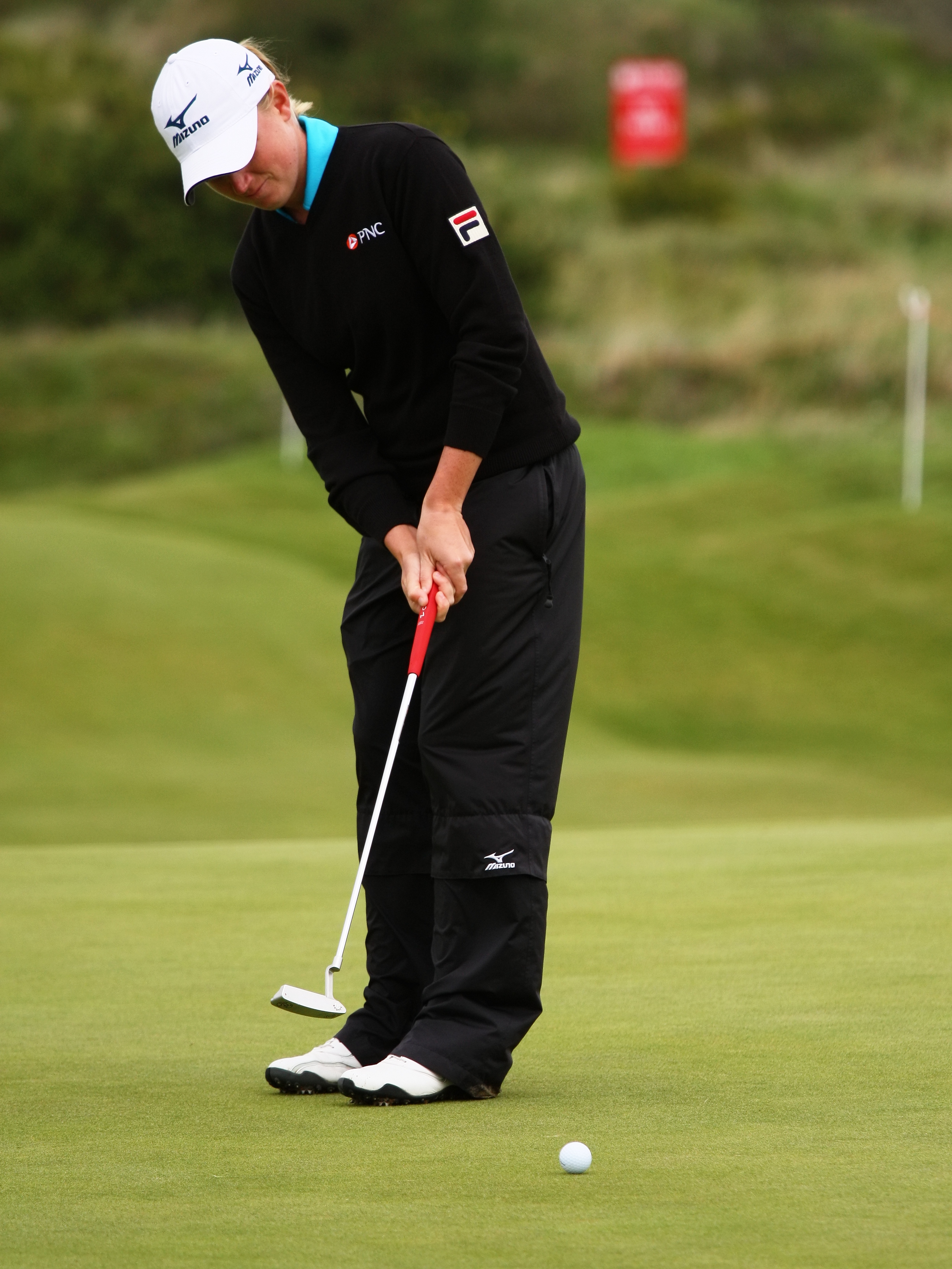
Stacy Lewis putting at the 2010 British Open

Putting requires a high degree of precision. Putters are designed with features to promote a smooth stroke, good glide, consistent contact, controlled ball launch, and appropriate fit in terms of shaft angle and length.

The striking face of a putter is usually not perpendicular to the ground: putters have a small amount of loft, intended to "lift" the ball out of any depression it has made or settled into on the green, which reduces bouncing. This loft is typically 5–6°, and by strict rules cannot be more than 10°. The putter is the only club that may have a grip that is not perfectly round; "shield"-like cross-sections with a flat top and curved underside are most common. The putter is also the only club allowed to have a bent shaft; often, club-makers will attach the shaft to the club-head on the near edge for visibility, but to increase stability, the shaft is bent near the clubhead mounting so that its lie and the resulting clubhead position places the line of the straight part of the shaft at the sweet spot of the subhead, where the ball should be for the best putt. This increases accuracy as the golfer can direct their swing through the ball, without feeling like they are slightly behind it. Many putters also have an offset hosel, which places the shaft of the club in line with the center of the ball at impact, again to improve stability and feel as, combined with the vertical bend, the shaft will point directly into the center of the ball at impact.

Historically putters were known as "putting cleeks" and were made entirely from woods such as beech, ash and hazel. In the 1900s putters heads evolved, with iron club heads becoming a more popular design. The design of the putter's club head has undergone radical changes since the late 1950s. Putters were originally a forged iron piece very similar in shape to the irons of the day. One of the first to apply scientific principles to golf club design was engineer Karsten Solheim. In 1959 instead of attaching the shaft at the heel of the blade, Solheim attached it in the center, transferring much of the weight of the club head to the perimeter.

Through attempts to lower the center of gravity of the club head, it evolved into a shorter, thicker head slightly curved from front to rear (the so-called "hot dog" putter). The introduction of investment casting for club heads allowed drastically different shapes to be made far more easily and cheaply than with forging, resulting in several design improvements. First of all, the majority of mass behind the clubface was placed as low as possible, resulting in an L-shaped side profile with a thin, flat club face and another thin block along the bottom of the club behind the face. Additionally, peripheral weighting, or the placing of mass as far away from the center of the clubface as possible, increases the moment of inertia of the club head, reducing twisting if the club contacts the ball slightly off-center and thus giving the club a larger "sweet spot" with which to contact the ball. Newer innovations include replacing the metal at the "sweet spot" with a softer metal or polymer compound that will give and rebound at impact, which increases the peak impulse (force × time) imparted to the ball for better distance. Putters are subdivided into mallet, peripheral weighted and blade styles. Power instability and practice/play convertibility are features embodied in the latest putter design technology.

=== Design features ===
- Balance:
  - Center vs heel shafted - changes the aim & balance and how the head rotates
  - Face-balanced vs toe-hang - best suited to straight back and straight through vs in-to-out-to-in arcing strokes
  - Counterbalanced - heavier grip (or extra grip weight), and sometimes shaft, to shift balance upward for added stability on longer putters or those with heavier heads
  - Zero-torque/torque-balanced/lie-angle-balanced - designs that keep the face square to the stroke by aligning the shaft axis through the head’s center of gravity
- 'Fetch' putter - has design feature that enables the golf ball to be retrieved from the hole without the player needing to bend down. In November 2018 Lee Westwood won the Nedbank Golf Challenge using a PING Sigma 2 Fetch putter.

=== Long-shafted putters ===
Though most putters have a 32-to-35-inch (81–89 cm) shaft (slightly shorter for most ladies and juniors, longer for most men), putters are also made with longer shaft lengths and grips, and are designed to reduce the "degrees of freedom" allowed a player when he or she putts. Simply, the more joints that can easily bend or twist during the putting motion, the more degrees of freedom a player has when putting, which gives more flexibility and feel but can result in more inconsistent putts. With a normal putter, the player has six degrees of freedom: hands, wrists, elbows, shoulders, waist and knees, all of which can be moved just slightly to affect the path of the ball and likely prevent a putt from falling in the cup. Such motions, especially nervous uncontrollable motions, are called yips, and having a chronic case of the yips can ruin a golfer's short game. German professional golfer Bernhard Langer is famous for having such a severe case that he once needed four putts to hole out from within three feet of the cup.

A belly putter is typically about 6 to 8 inches (15–20 cm) longer than a normal putter and is designed to be "anchored" against the abdomen of the player. This design reduces or removes the importance of the hands, wrists, elbows, and shoulders. A long putter is even longer and is designed to be anchored from the chest or even the chin and similarly reduces the impact of the hands, wrists, elbows and shoulders. The disadvantages are decreased feel and control over putting power, especially with the long putter. Their use in professional tournaments is hotly contested; Jim Furyk and others on the pro tours including Langer and Vijay Singh have used belly putters at some point with a marked improvement of their short game, while players like Tiger Woods and officials like former USGA technical director Frank Thomas have condemned it as conferring an unfair advantage on users.

In November 2012, a proposed change for the 2016 edition of the rules of golf was announced, which would forbid players from anchoring a club against their body in any way. This rule change will affect the use of long and belly putters by players. Notable players affected include Adam Scott, Tim Clark, Kevin Stadler, Keegan Bradley, Webb Simpson, Carl Pettersson and Ernie Els. This new rule (14-1b Anchoring the Club) was approved in May 2013 and took effect on 1 January 2016. This new rule prohibits "anchoring" a putter when making a stroke. It does not ban long-shafted putters, rather, it bans the method by which they were originally designed to be used.

Following the rule change, longer putters continued to be used, notably by Langer and Scott, with the butt held away from the body. Anchoring below the elbow remained legal, and the so called armlock putting stroke, using a putter with a longer grip designed to rest along the (usually lead) forearm to stabilize the stroke, has been used by several tour professionals including Matt Kuchar and Bryson DeChambeau.
