= Doughty Hanson & Co =

British private equity fund manager

Doughty Hanson & Co.
- Type: Private
- Industry: Private Equity
- Founded: 1985; 41 years ago
- Founder: Nigel Doughty and Richard Hanson
- Headquarters: London, United Kingdom
- Products: Private equity funds, Leveraged buyouts
- Total assets: €8 billion
- Website: dh-pep.com

Doughty Hanson & Co. is a British private equity fund manager focused on leveraged buyout and recapitalization transactions primarily of upper middle-market companies in Europe. The firm also invests opportunistically in European real estate and provides early-stage venture capital to technology companies.

The firm which was founded in 1985 by Nigel Doughty, Chris Wallis and Richard Hanson is one of the oldest European buyout private equity firms. Since its inception, the firm has invested over €23 billion across more than 100 investments.

On 4 February 2012, Doughty was found dead in the gymnasium of his Lincolnshire home. Then, on 10 August 2015, the firm announced the shutdown of most of its European offices after abandoning its next round of funding. The offices closed in 2015 included Paris, Frankfurt, Madrid and Stockholm. In May 2017, the firm re-branded itself to DH Private Equity Partners. Doughty Hanson & Co FZE is the successor entity to the former Doughty Hanson companies, including DH Private Equity Partners. Doughty Hanson & Co FZE subsequently continued the business.

== History ==
Doughty Hanson traces its history back to 1985 when Nigel Doughty and Richard (Dick) Hanson started working together on European buyout investments within Standard Chartered Bank as founding members of its management buyout unit. In 1990 they established CWB Partners, a joint private equity venture between Standard Chartered and Westdeutsche Landesbank.

Doughty Hanson was established as an independent firm in 1995. In 1999, the group expanded its activities with the formation of a real estate investment team and the following year it established a team to focus on early-stage technology venture capital investing.

== Investment strategy ==
Doughty Hanson's three product areas operate as separate fund families:

- Private Equity – Doughty Hanson's buyout team focuses on majority ownership and control of market-leading businesses at the upper end of the European middle-market with enterprise values between €250m and €1bn.
- Real Estate – Doughty Hanson is an opportunistic investor and developer active in the office, retail and logistics sectors. Investments range from the acquisition of existing single assets and portfolios to more complex developments and urban regeneration projects.
- Technology Ventures – The Doughty Hanson Technology Ventures team targets technology companies within three industry sectors: internet software, mobile communications and clean energy technology.

=== Responsible Investing ===
In June 2007 Doughty Hanson became one of the first private equity signatories to the United Nations Principles for Responsible Investment (UNPRI), which provide a framework for incorporating environmental, social and governance (ESG) issues into investment decision-making and ownership practices. A year later the firm became the first private equity manager in Europe to hire a dedicated Head of Sustainability to focus on the implementation, management and monitoring of ESG issues across the Doughty Hanson portfolio.

== Investment funds ==
Since inception, Doughty Hanson has raised over €8 billion across its five private equity funds.

The following is a summary of the investment funds raised to date by Doughty Hanson:

Fund	Vintage Year	Committed Capital (millions)
Private Equity Fund I	1990	£167
Private Equity Fund II	1995	DM 1,000
Private Equity Fund III	1998	$2,700
Real Estate Fund I	2000	$616
Technology Ventures Fund I	2000	$237
Private Equity Fund IV	2004	€1,500
Real Estate Fund II	2005	€530
Private Equity Fund V	2007	€3,000

In 2007, Doughty completed fundraising for its fifth private equity fund with €3.0 billion of investor commitments. This came just two years after the firm had wrapped up a difficult fundraising for Doughty Hanson IV, in 2004 which had only generated €1.6 billion of investor commitments compared with the firm's original €3.0 billion target. Doughty Hanson III, raised in 1997 had been a €2.7 billion investment fund.

== Portfolio companies ==
The following investments are representative of Doughty Hanson's portfolio of private companies:

- The RHM Group - RHM was among the leading food manufacturing groups in the UK. Founded in 1899, RHM was acquired by Doughty Hanson in 2000 and listed on the London Stock Exchange in July 2005.
- Priory Healthcare is the largest independent provider of mental health and rehabilitation services in the UK. Priory was acquired by Doughty Hanson in 2002 and was sold in July 2005 in a transaction valued at £875m.
- Saft Groupe S.A. - Saft is a manufacturer of high-end batteries for a wide range of niche applications, including aviation, railway, industrial stand-by, defence, and emergency lighting. Saft was acquired by Doughty Hanson in 2004 and the company was listed on Euronext, Paris, in June 2005.
- Moeller - Moeller is one of the largest globally active manufacturers of low-voltage electrical distribution and automation components for industrial, commercial, and residential applications. Moeller was acquired by Doughty Hanson in 2005 and sold in April 2008 in a transaction valued at €1.65 billion.

Other notable investments include: TMF Group, TV3 (Ireland), Tumi Inc., Dunlop Standard Aerospace Group, Caudwell Group, and LM Wind Power.

== Notable alumni ==
- James Max - journalist and radio presenter specialising in business issues and was a semifinalist on the first series of the British version of The Apprentice television programme.
- Mark Florman - founder and former CEO of Maizels, Westerberg & Co.
