= Nordic and Scandinavian diaspora in the United Kingdom =

Nordic and Scandinavian diaspora in the United Kingdom refers to people from the Nordic countries who settled in the United Kingdom, their descendants, history and culture. There has been exchange of populations between Scandinavia and Great Britain at different periods over the past 1,400 years. Over the last couple of centuries, there has been regular migration from Scandinavia to Great Britain, from families looking to settle, businesspeople, academics to migrant workers, particularly those in the oil industry.

== Scandinavian ancestry of British peoples ==
Prior to the Viking Age, the Jutes were an early Germanic tribe who settled in present-day southern England in the 5th century, and may have been of Scandinavian origin. As many as 20,000-35,000 Scandinavian migrants may have settled in England during the Viking Age in the 8th-11th centuries. A study into the Scandinavian ancestry of British peoples found that there is evidence of particular concentrations in the Isle of Man, Shetland and Orkney; and to a lesser degree, in the Western Isles of Scotland and in the Wirral, West Lancashire, Cumbria and Yorkshire in England.

The Normans established a ruling class in medieval England, following the Norman conquest of 1066, with most kings of England from the 11th to 13th century also being Dukes of Normandy. Normans were, in part, the French-speaking descendants of Scandinavian settlers in northern France after the establishment of the Duchy of Normandy in 910 AD.

Several British surnames are indicative of Scandinavian roots. Some, including Cobain, Gamble, Hemming, Ransom, Thorburn and Tordoff are derived from Scandinavian given names. Others, such as Bond, are derived from Scandinavian legal terms, while Dench and Norman originate as ethonyms for Scandinavians.

== Contemporary migration ==
The 2001 UK Census recorded 22,525 people born in Sweden, 18,695 in Denmark, 13,798 in Norway, 11,322 in Finland and 1,552 in Iceland.

In more recent estimates by the Office for National Statistics, Sweden was the only Scandinavian country to feature in the top 60 foreign countries of birth of UK residents in 2013, with an estimated 27,000 people.

== Notable individuals ==
The table below includes Britons with significant recent Nordic ancestry.

Name	Image	Ancestry	Occupation and notes
Jacob Aagaard	Jacob Aagaard	Denmark	Danish-born Scottish chess grandmaster
Thelo Aasgaard	Thelo Aasgaard	Norway	Footballer for Rangers F.C. and Norway. Born and grew up in Liverpool: of Norwegian descent through his father
Alicia Agneson		Sweden	Actress who moved to London at age 15
Damon Albarn	Damon Albarn	Denmark	English-Icelandic musician, singer and songwriter of Danish descent through his mother.
Alexandra of Denmark	Alexandra of Denmark	Denmark	Queen of the United Kingdom, consort of Edward VII, King of the United Kingdom and Emperor of India
Marit Allen		Norway	fashion journalist and costume designer
Marc Almond	Marc Almond	Norway	Singer-songwriter of Norwegian descent through his mother.
Sir Ove Arup		Denmark	British engineer, founder of Arup
Richard Ayoade	Richard Ayoade	Norway	British comedian and actor with a Norwegian mother.
Svend Bayer		Denmark	Potter
Elynor and Zoe Bäckstedt		Sweden	Welsh racing cyclists, daughters of Swedish racing cyclist Magnus Bäckstedt
Antonia Bernath	Antonia Bernath	Norway	Actress
Tom Blomqvist	Tom Blomqvist	Sweden	Racing driver, son of Swedish rally driver Stig Blomqvist
MyAnna Buring	Myanna Buring	Sweden	actress
W. D. Caröe	W. D. Caröe	Denmark	Architect
Georgina Castle		Sweden	Actress
Izzy Christiansen	Izzy Christiansen	Denmark	Former footballer for Manchester City, Lyon, Everton and England
Roald Dahl	Roald Dahl	Norway	Author
Sophie Dahl		Norway	Fashion model and granddaughter of Roald Dahl
Camilla Dallerup		Denmark	Ballroom dancer, a former professional on BBC One's Strictly Come Dancing
Sandra Dickinson		Finland	actress
Carl Johannes Edwards		Finland	stained glass artist
Britt Ekland	Britt Ekland	Sweden	Actress and Bond Girl
Johan Eliasch		Sweden	UK-based businessman, chairman & CEO of sporting goods manufacturer Head and deputy treasurer of the Conservative Party
Harry Julius Emeléus		Finland	chemist
Mariella Frostrup		Norway	Journalist and radio and television presenter
Adeline Genée	Adeline Genée	Denmark	Ballet dancer
Charles Hambro		Denmark	Banker and politician, part of the Hambros Banking dynasty
Gustav Holst	Gustav Holst	Sweden	English composer and music teacher, best known for his orchestral suite The Planets
Agnete Hoy		Denmark	potter
Carl Jenkinson	Carl Jenkinson	Finland	Footballer, formerly of Arsenal F.C. and England, also represented Finland at under-19 and under-21 level. Mother is a Swedish-speaking Finn
Ashley Jensen	Ashley Jensen	Denmark	Scottish actress
Ulrika Jonsson		Sweden	Television personality
Synnøve Karlsen		Norway	Actress
Jessica Kellgren-Fozard		Sweden	YouTuber
Jonas Kellgren		Sweden	First professor of rheumatology in the UK
Felix Kjellberg	PewDiePie	Sweden	Swedish YouTuber who moved to Brighton.
Sonja Kristina	Sonja Kristina	Sweden	Rock singer and frontwoman of Curved Air, maternal granddaughter of Swedish actress Gerda Lundequist
Gertrude Lawrence	Gertrude Lawrence	Denmark	actress / performer
Magnus Lund	Magnus Lundl	Norway	English rugby union player
John Lundstram	John Lundstram1	Norway	English footballer
Jessica Madsen		Denmark	actress
Mikko Mäkelä	Mikko Mäkelä	Finland	filmmaker
Magnus Magnusson		Iceland	Television presenter, notably for the BBC's Mastermind, and novelist
Sally Magnusson		Iceland	News presenter and daughter of Magnus Magnusson
Rosita Spencer-Churchill, Duchess of Marlborough		Sweden	Artist and noblewoman
Jan Mølby		Denmark	Former professional footballer who spent much of his career at Liverpool F.C.
Kirsten O'Brien		Norway	TV presenter
Nils Ramming		Sweden	footballer
Hans Rausing		Sweden	Billionaire heir to the Tetra Pak/Tetra Laval dynasty
Sigrid Rausing		Sweden	Philanthropist and publisher
Toby Regbo		Norway	Actor
Christian Rodska		Denmark	Actor
Christian Salvesen		Norway	Shipowner and businessman
Edward Theodore Salvesen		Norway	Scottish lawyer, politician and judge
Peter Schmeichel		Denmark	Former Manchester United goalkeeper; his son Kasper spent his childhood in Manchester.
Sasha Siem		Norway	Singer-songwriter and composer
Sofia Sjöborg		Sweden	Equestrian; born and raised in London and represents Sweden in international competitions.
Nicholas Ashley-Cooper, 12th Earl of Shaftesbury		Sweden	Peer and runner
Steve Simonsen		Denmark	English goalkeeper
Rupert Svendsen-Cook		Norway	English Formula BMW UK race car driver
Georgia Tennant	Georgia Tennant	Finland	actress and producer
Sandi Toksvig		Denmark	Comedian
Charly Wegelius	Charly Wegelius	Finland	Directeur sportif and former racing cyclist, son of Finnish equestrian Christopher Wegelius
Christian Wolmar		Sweden	Journalist, author, and railway historian
Patrick Wymark		Finland	English actor

== See also ==
- Denmark–United Kingdom relations
- Finland–United Kingdom relations
- Iceland–United Kingdom relations
- Norway–United Kingdom relations
- Sweden–United Kingdom relations
- Swedes in the United Kingdom
- Danelaw
- Scandinavian migration to France
