= UK Swedish =

UK Swedish may refer to:

- Swedes in the United Kingdom
- British immigration to Sweden
- Sweden–United Kingdom relations
