= Direct grant grammar school =

Former type of English secondary school

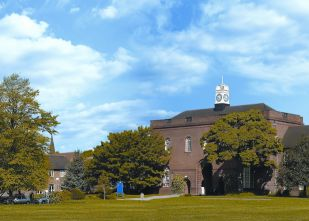
The Manchester Grammar School, the best-known of the direct grant grammar schools, was significantly larger than most.

A direct grant grammar school was a type of selective secondary school in the United Kingdom that existed between 1945 and 1976. One quarter of the places in these schools were directly funded by central government, while the remainder attracted fees, some paid by a Local Education Authority and some by the pupils' parents or guardians. On average, the schools received just over half of their income from the state.

The status was introduced in England and Wales by the Education Act 1944 as a modification of an existing direct grant scheme to some long standing endowed grammar schools. There were 179 direct grant grammar schools, which, together with almost 1,300 grammar schools maintained by local authorities, formed the most academic tier of the Tripartite System. They varied greatly in size and composition, but, on average, achieved higher academic results than either maintained grammar schools or private schools.

State secondary education was reorganised on comprehensive lines in the late 1960s and early 1970s. The direct grant was phased out from 1975 and the schools were required to choose between becoming maintained comprehensive schools or fully independent schools. Forty-five schools, almost all Roman Catholic, joined the state system, while a few closed. The rest (including all the secular schools) became independent and mostly remain as highly selective independent schools.

== Origins ==
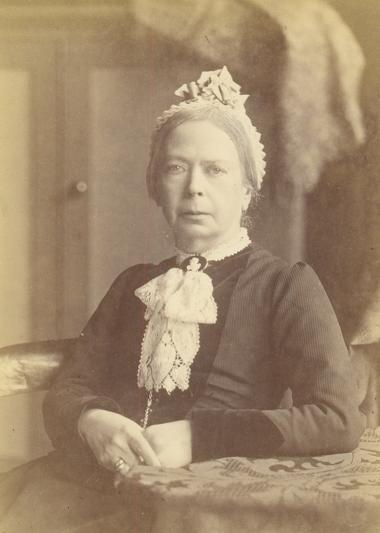
Frances Buss, a pioneer of women's education and founding head of North London Collegiate School

In the 19th century, few boys and very few girls in England and Wales received secondary education, which was typically available only from charity, endowed or private schools. During this time, secondary provision expanded and adjusted to growing demand. At the start of that century, some boarding schools like Eton College and Winchester College thrived educating the sons of the aristocracy, but most endowed grammar schools were in decline, their classical curricula seen as irrelevant to the industrial age. These schools were reformed under the Endowed Schools Act 1869, which also led to many endowments being diverted to the creation of girls' schools. In the meantime a range of other schools had appeared. After the Roman Catholic Relief Act 1829 and mid-century Irish immigration, Catholic teaching orders from Ireland and mainland Europe began to establish their own grammar schools. New proprietary schools were established, initially as joint-stock companies, converting to charities if they were successful. One of the largest such companies was the Girls' Public Day School Company (later Trust), set up to provide an affordable academic education for girls, which had established 32 schools by 1894.

In the latter part of the century, many of the less wealthy schools received annual grants from the Department of Science and Art and from their county councils. The grant system was restructured when the Board of Education was created in 1901 to fund early secondary schools, and the Education Act 1902 gave counties and county boroughs responsibility for schools, designating them as local education authorities (LEAs). Secondary schools controlled by voluntary bodies could receive a grant from either the Board of Education or their local authority, or both. In return they were required to meet the Board's regulations, and were subject to the same system of inspections as state-funded schools. Under the Free Place Regulations of 1907, secondary schools in receipt of grant were required to admit a specified proportion of their intake, usually 25%, free of charge from state elementary schools. Suitable pupils were selected using a scholarship examination.

Circular 1381, a directive issued by the Board of Education in 1926, required that schools choose a single source of grant: they could receive a "direct grant" from central government, or be "grant-aided" by their local authority. By 1932 there were 240 secondary schools receiving a direct grant, compared with 1138 aided by local authorities. Although this division was intended purely as an administrative convenience, local authorities gradually gained more influence over the schools they aided, in part because of the schools' weak financial position during the Great Depression.

The Depression and the falling birth rate in the pre-war years had also weakened independent schools and schools receiving the direct grant. At the same time, the state-funded sector had grown to the point where universal secondary education seemed achievable, and changes in society had made the idea more popular. Proposals were made for a reorganisation of the maintained sector, including a new accommodation with the voluntary schools. In response, the Headmasters' Conference persuaded the President of the Board of Education, R.A. Butler, to establish a commission under Lord Fleming in July 1942 "to consider means whereby the association between the Public Schools ... and the general education system of the country could be developed and extended".

== Direct grant scheme ==
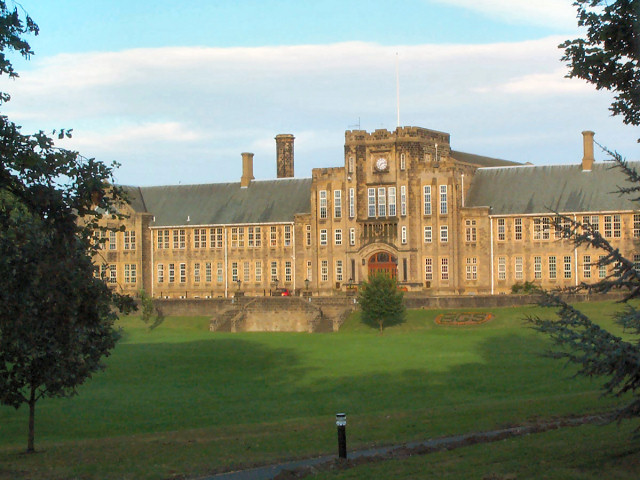
Bradford Grammar School, originally a large secular boys school (now mixed)

The Education Act 1944 aimed to introduce a universal system of secondary education for England and Wales. Under the Tripartite System, there were to be three types of schools, with pupils sitting an eleven plus exam to determine which type of school they would be sent to. The most academic tier would be the grammar school, and the Act revised the terms of the direct grant to operate alongside LEA-maintained grammar schools, many of which were former LEA-aided schools. The latter schools, unable to cope with the costs of the reorganisation required by the 1944 Act, had been offered the status of voluntary controlled or voluntary aided schools, under which the state would pay all their running costs and all or most of their capital costs. They were thus integrated into the state system.

The new direct grant scheme was a modification of proposals in the Fleming Report of 1944. A direct grant grammar school would provide 25% of its places free of charge to children who had spent at least 2 years in maintained primary schools, and would reserve at least a further 25% of places to be paid for by the LEA if required. The remaining ("residuary") places would attract fees, but no child would be admitted unless they had achieved the required standard in the eleven plus. The schools would be inspected by Her Majesty's Inspectors of Schools, would have one third of their governing bodies appointed by the LEA, and would require the approval of the Secretary of State to raise fees or carry out building work.

The scheme was attractive to most of the direct grant schools. Of the 231 secondary schools receiving direct grant in 1945, 196 applied to join the new scheme, with the rest becoming independent schools. In addition 31 grant-aided schools applied to join the scheme. Of these, 164 schools (including four formerly grant-aided schools) were accepted as direct grant grammar schools. The list was re-opened between 1957 and 1961, when 44 applications were received, of which 15 were accepted. There were therefore 179 direct grant grammar schools, alongside almost 1300 maintained grammar schools.

Beside the Direct Grant Scheme, the Act also made provision for LEAs to fund places at independent schools in areas where there was a shortage of appropriate places in maintained schools. For example, there might be a lack of selective places, or of selective places in Roman Catholic schools. In the late 1960s, 56 independent schools had over 25% of their places funded by LEAs in this way, with seven of them over 75% LEA-funded.

== Characteristics of the schools ==
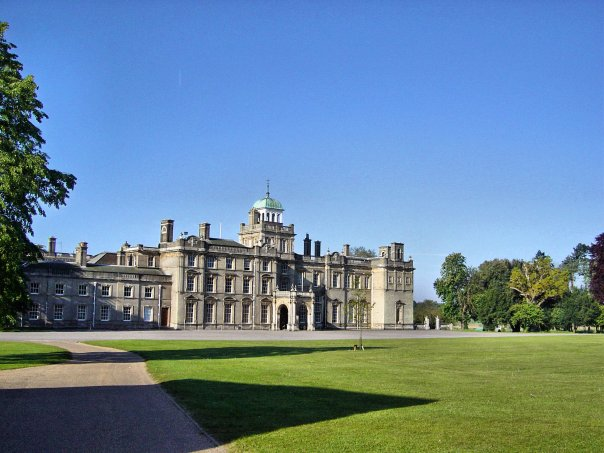
Culford School, the first and eventually one of only three mixed direct grant grammars

In 1966, when direct grant schools were at their height, they educated 3.1% of secondary pupils across England and Wales, while independent schools accounted for 7.1%. For A-level students, these proportions rose to 6.2% and 14.7% respectively. Before Culford School became coeducational in 1972, all but 2 of the schools were single sex, with a slight majority of girls' schools. There were 56 Roman Catholic schools, 14 Church of England and 6 Methodist. (Note: The National Digital Archive of Datasets data for 1975 has 54 RC, 12 CE and 6 Methodist. The 5 schools that left the scheme before 1975 comprised 2 CE (Trinity School of John Whitgift and Oakham School), 2 RC (St Joseph's Convent School, West Hartlepool and the Convent of Notre Dame High School for Girls, Wigan) and one non-denominational (Queen Victoria High School).) Many of the schools were in the north of England, with 46 in the historic county of Lancashire (including Manchester) and 18 in the West Riding of Yorkshire, while there were only 7 in inner London and 4 in Wales. In 1961, an average of 59% of pupils at direct grant grammar schools were state-funded, but the proportion also varied greatly between schools.

Direct grant schools had similar teacher/pupil ratios to the maintained grammar schools, as their fees were regulated to match costs at the latter schools. The proportion of teachers with first and second class degrees was slightly lower than in their maintained counterparts. The principal difference from the maintained schools was greater freedom from LEA influence.

Although there was much variation, these schools as a group were middle-class institutions, with many tending to move closer to the independent schools in social composition. On average, three-quarters of pupils came from white-collar homes, including 60% with fathers in management or the professions, while only 7% were children of semi-skilled or unskilled workers. On average, the intake of the schools was also more academically selective than either maintained grammar schools or independent schools. Their results were correspondingly high, with 60% of their pupils staying on to age 18 and 38% going on to university, significantly greater proportions than either of the other groups of schools.

== Types of schools ==
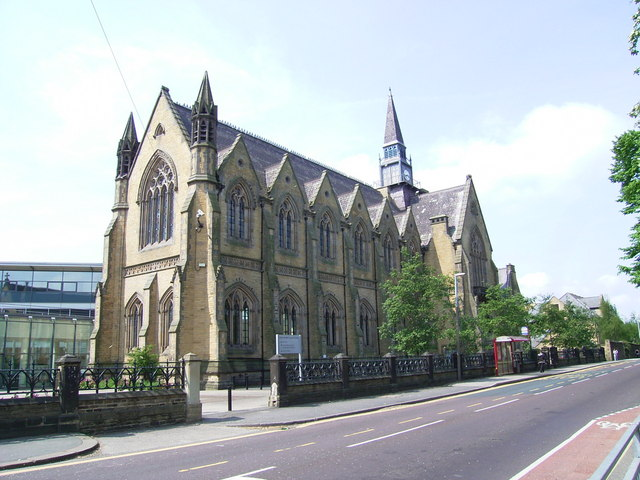
Leeds Grammar School, a school of over 1,000 boys (later merged with the girls school)

There was a great deal of variation between direct grant grammar schools. According to the Donnison Report (discussed in the next section), the schools were of four types, though the boundaries between them were not always clear-cut.

Donnison called the first group "regional schools": large, highly academically selective day schools with large sixth forms, located near large cities, and mostly boys' schools belonging to the Headmaster's Conference. The archetype of the direct grant grammar school, was the largest, The Manchester Grammar School, whose High Master from 1945 to 1962, Eric James (elevated to the peerage in 1959), was an outspoken advocate of the "meritocracy". (Note: "The most famous of them is Manchester Grammar School" —Anthony Sampson "Manchester Grammar School is always quoted when we talk about the direct grant schools; but I think that even the noble Lord, Lord James of Rusholme, would agree that Manchester Grammar School is almost unique among the direct grant schools." —Baroness Bacon) In 1968 the school sent 77% of its boys on to university, a rate surpassed only by the independent Winchester College. Close behind were such schools as Bradford Grammar School, Leeds Grammar School, Haberdashers' Aske's School and Latymer Upper School. A large girls' school of similar academic attainment was North London Collegiate School, which had been founded in 1850 by Frances Buss. These schools achieved university admission rates that rivalled the older public schools, which in turn moved to raise their academic standards for admission, and to increase their focus of academic achievement. With their high profile, such schools formed the popular image of a direct grant grammar school, but they accounted for only about a quarter of them.

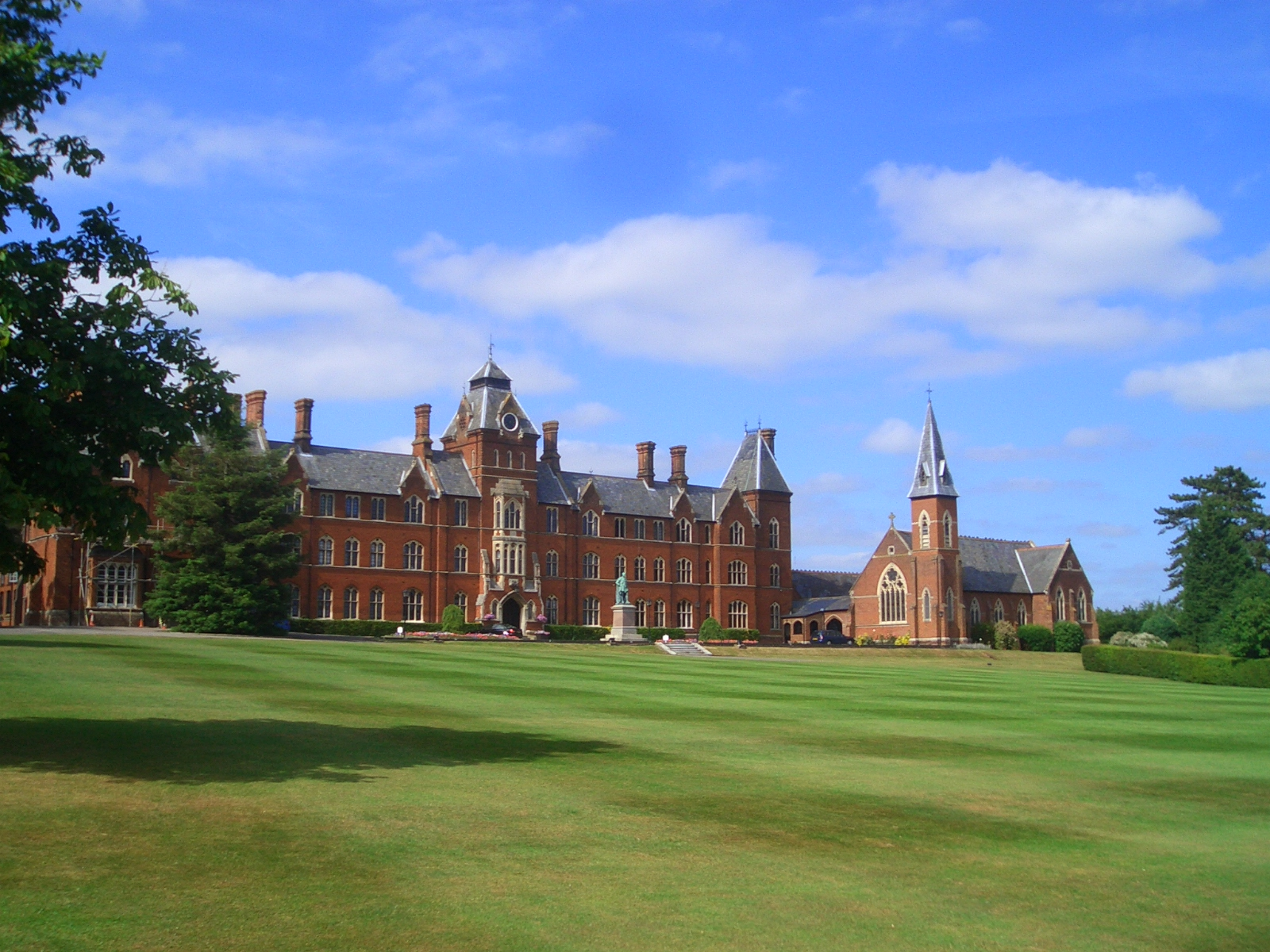
Framlingham College, a boarding school in Suffolk

The second group consisted of 30 schools (23 for boys and 7 for girls) with a significant proportion (over 25%) of boarders. Boarders made up the majority of pupils at 15 schools (all but one for boys), including five of the six Methodist schools. Boarding schools tended to be smaller and less academically selective than other direct grant schools, and to take a larger proportion of fee-paying pupils. They also tended to be more socially selective, with nearly three quarters of their pupils having fathers in management or the professions.

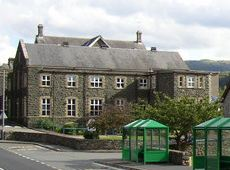
Dr Williams' School was a non-denominational school of fewer than 200 girls in Dolgellau, Gwynedd.

The third group, Roman Catholic schools, made up nearly a third of the direct grant schools (19 for boys and 37 for girls). They were predominantly day schools, though 10 of them took a small proportion of boarders. Their fees were about 15% lower than other direct grant grammars, and they tended to take a much higher proportion of LEA-funded pupils. In 1968, 40 of these schools took over 80% of their pupils from their LEAs; the average proportion was 86%. They also tended to be more socially mixed, with 37% of their pupils from managerial and professional homes and 16% children of semi-skilled or unskilled workers. These schools were thus similar to the LEA-maintained Roman Catholic grammar schools, which they outnumbered. Lacking endowments and having lower fee income, they were less financially secure than other direct grant grammars.

The fourth group were non-denominational local grammar schools, often with an intake more able on average than in maintained grammar schools, but covering a broader range. These included the 23 schools of the Girls' Public Day School Trust (now the Girls' Day School Trust).

== Comprehensive reorganisation ==
During the post-War period, many parts of the world moved from selective education to comprehensive schools catering for children of all abilities. Dissatisfaction with the Tripartite System grew during the 1950s, with concern over the harsh division of the school population at the age of 11, and the loss to the economy of the "submerged three-quarters" in secondary modern schools. Experiments with comprehensive schools spread from Anglesey to the Midlands and Yorkshire.

In 1964, a Labour government was elected promising "to reorganise the State secondary schools on comprehensive lines". In the following year, the Department of Education and Science distributed Circular 10/65, requesting that Local Education Authorities prepare plans for such a reorganisation of their schools. The Circular also requested consultation between LEAs and direct grant schools on their participation in a comprehensive system. For this reason, direct grant schools were excluded from consideration by the Public Schools Commission set up in 1965, even though 152 of them would otherwise have fallen within its remit.

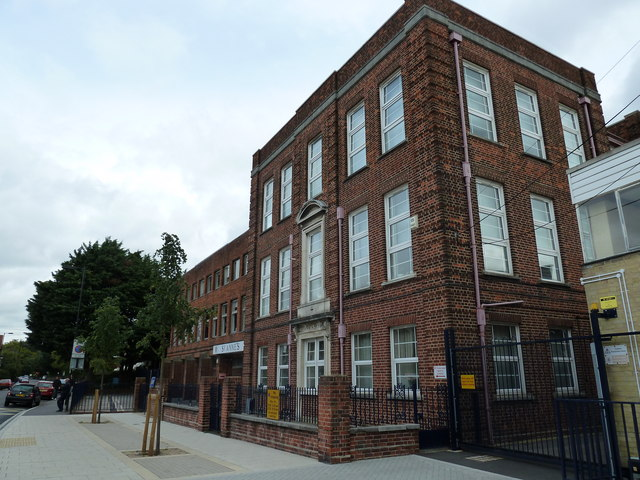
St Anne's Convent School became a comprehensive in the 1960s, expanding to the annex on the left.

There was little progress in the local negotiations proposed in the Circular. Two Catholic girls' schools, St Anne's Convent School, Southampton and St Anthony's School, Sunderland, converted to a fully comprehensive intake, expanding to over 1000 pupils each. A few others proposed minor adjustments, but the vast majority were unchanged. In view of this lack of progress, the Public Schools Commission was asked in October 1967 to add direct grant schools to its investigation. The commission, now chaired by David Donnison, issued its second report in 1970, concluding that "Grammar schools of the traditional kind cannot be combined with a comprehensive system of education: we must choose what we want. Fee-paying is not compatible with comprehensive education." They recommended that the schools choose between becoming voluntary aided comprehensives and full independence, but the Conservatives came to power before any action had been taken.

Meanwhile, a trickle of schools had begun to leave the scheme, starting with Trinity School of John Whitgift, which became independent in 1968, but still had half its places funded by the LEA. It was followed in 1970 by Oakham School, which became co-educational in the following year, and Queen Victoria High School, which merged with The Cleveland School to form Teesside High School. A respite was provided in the early 1970s, when Margaret Thatcher, the Conservative Education Secretary, raised the level of grant, which had been lowered by the Labour government.

== Abolition and legacy ==
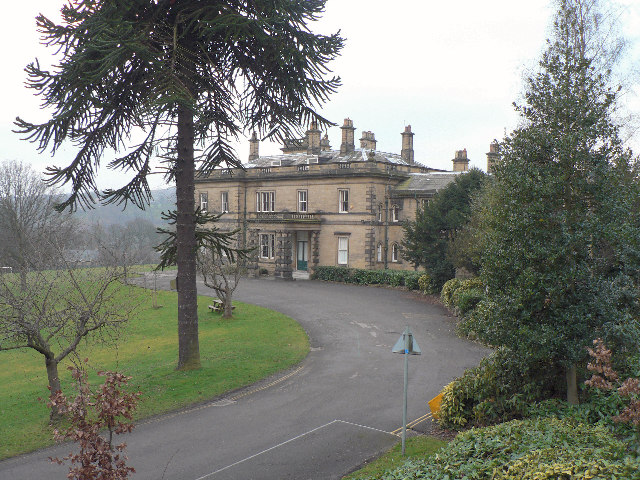
Notre Dame High School in Sheffield, a former direct grant grammar for girls that is now a mixed comprehensive

Labour returned to power in 1974 and enacted the Direct Grant Grammar Schools (Cessation of Grant) Regulations 1975, which required schools to choose whether to become LEA-maintained comprehensive schools or independent schools without grant.

Of the 174 remaining direct grant grammar schools, 51 (two Church of England and the rest Catholic) applied to join the state sector, of which 46 were accepted. These schools had become dependent on state funding, and the move to comprehensive education was also supported by the Roman Catholic hierarchy, often over the objections of those connected with the schools. One school, St. Joseph's College, Stoke-on-Trent, was approved to join the state system, but became independent instead following a campaign by parents. Elsewhere the plans proceeded over local objections, with schools closing or becoming comprehensive schools or sixth form colleges, often by merging with other schools. Dr Williams School, a small school for girls in Dolgellau, northwest Wales, also closed at this time.

The remaining schools, including all of the large secular ones, became independent when their grant was phased out as the remaining state-funded pupils left. This coincided with the mid-1970s recession, a difficult time for independent schools but doubly so for the former direct grant schools, which had just lost 25–50% of their intake. Many local boys' schools became coeducational to replace the lost places. An echo of the direct grant, the Assisted Places scheme, was introduced by the Conservative government of Margaret Thatcher in 1981, lasting until 1997. Approximately two-thirds of these places were held at former direct grant grammar schools. The independent sector soon recovered, and prospered without competition from state grammar schools.

From 1993 a small number of Roman Catholic former direct grant schools entered the state sector as grant-maintained schools. A few secular schools have subsequently become academies. Those that remain independent are typically highly selective, and have strong academic reputations. In 2001, they included 61 of the 100 highest performing independent day schools. No longer a bridge between state and private sectors, these schools have become part of a flourishing independent sector now sharply distinguished from the state system, a situation decried by the Sutton Trust as "educational apartheid".

== See also ==
- Armorial of schools in the United Kingdom
- List of English and Welsh endowed schools (19th century) (1818 survey of endowed Grammar Schools)
