= Swedes in the United Kingdom =

- (Sweden) (United Kingdom)

Total population
- Swedish-born residents 22,525 (2001 census); 32,611 (2011 census); 38,000 (2017 ONS estimate)

Regions with significant populations
- London, South East England

Languages
- British English, Swedish

Religion
- Christianity (predominantly Lutheranism)

Related ethnic groups
- Swedish Canadians, Swedish Americans, Swedish Australians

Swedes in the United Kingdom or British Swedes (Swedish: Storbritanniensvenskar) are immigrants from Sweden living in the United Kingdom as well as their British-born descendants. Although only around 38,000 Swedish-born people live in the UK, millions of Britons have some degree of Scandinavian ancestry that dates back over 1,000 years to the Viking invasion of Great Britain. The Swedish community in the UK is amongst the largest in the Swedish diaspora; in 2001 only the United States, Norway and Finland within the OECD had larger Swedish-born populations.

== History and settlement ==
=== Medieval period ===
Significant migration resulted during the Viking invasion of Britain in the years following 793 when pagan Vikings from Scandinavia started raiding and settling throughout the British Isles. Viking raids occurred up and down the largely undefended east coast of England and Scotland during the eighth and ninth centuries and Scandinavian settlements became established over the entire island of Great Britain, the most important of which was Jórvík (now York). Anglo-Danish rule came to an end in the 11th century when Normans invaded the shores of Britain. Despite this, Scandinavian influence is evident in the UK even to this day and many millions of Britons have Norse heritage (especially in Northern England, Eastern England, Scotland, Orkney and Shetland).

One of the earliest mentions of Swedes in English literature comes in the form of the Old English epic poem of Beowulf. The story is predominantly set in 6th century Scandinavia. Beowulf, a hero of the Geats, comes to the aid of Hrothgar, the king of the Danes, whose mead hall Heorot has been under attack from a monster known as Grendel. After Beowulf slays him, Grendel's mother attacks the hall and is then also defeated. Victorious, Beowulf goes home to Geatland (Götaland in modern Sweden) and becomes king of the Geats. Fifty years later, Beowulf defeats a dragon, but is mortally wounded in the battle. After his death, his attendants cremate his body and erect a barrow on a headland in his memory.

Another early recording of Swedes in England can be found on the so-called England runestones which describes Swedish Vikings taking gold, Danegeld and tributes in England. Almost all Runestones of this period mentioning England are found in modern-day Sweden.

=== Modern period ===
During the late 19th and early 20th centuries, Swedish emigration to the United States was rife and the majority of Swedes sailed from Gothenburg to Kingston upon Hull before travelling to Liverpool or Southampton to continue their journey to North America. This created a significant Swedish presence in these cities, so much so that Swedish churches were built to cater for the dynamic communities. Although most emigrants eventually left the ports for the US, some remained in Britain and started their new lives a stage early.

The number of Swedes migrating to the UK grew following the 1995 enlargement of the European Union, when Sweden joined the EU. All EU citizens are able to move and freely seek work in any other EU member state. The number of Swedish-born people in the UK doubled from around 11,000 in 1991 to 22,525 in 2001.

== Demographics and population ==
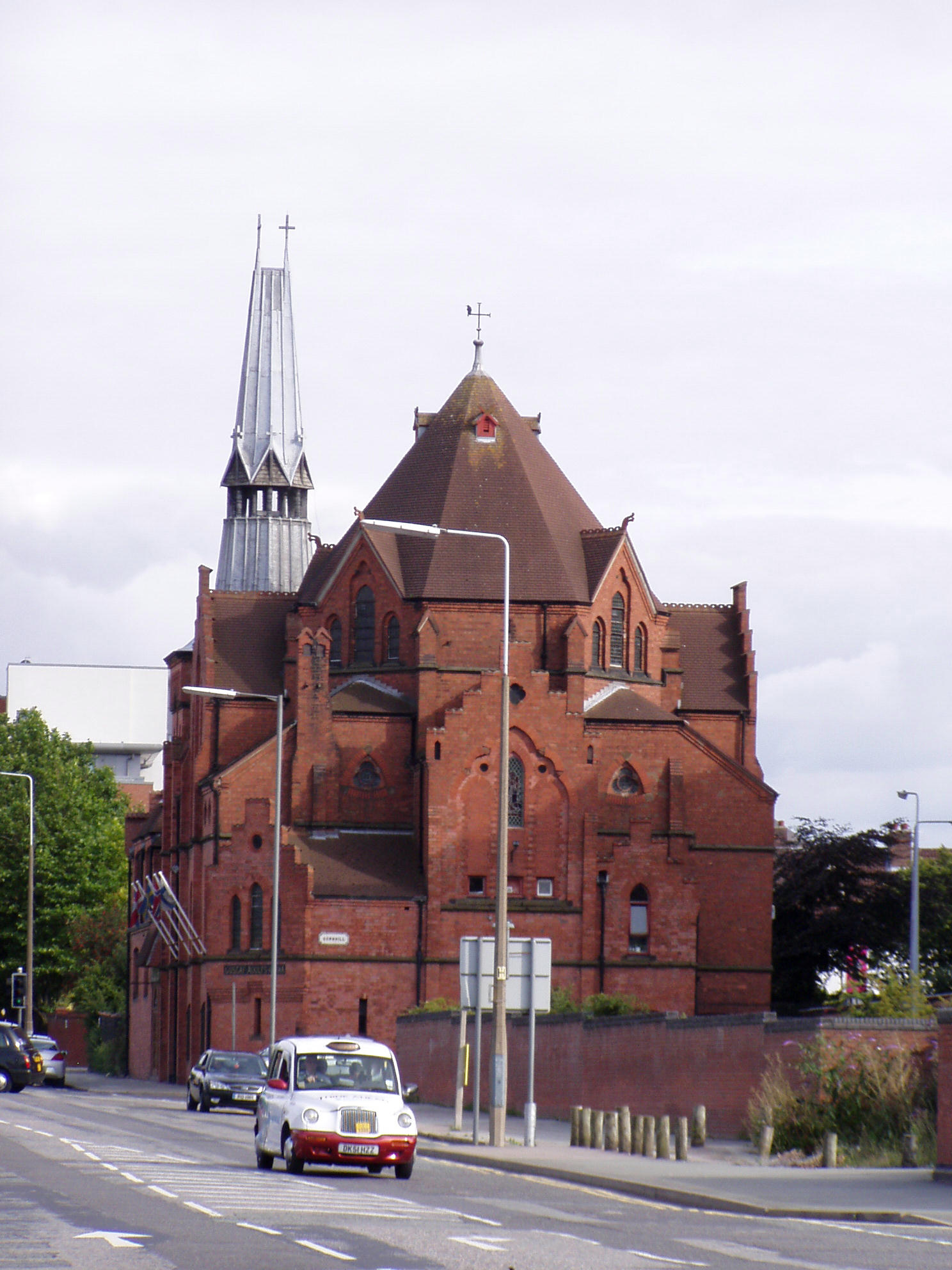
Gustav Adolf Church in Liverpool, the oldest surviving Swedish church in the UK

The 2001 UK census recorded 22,525 residents born in Sweden. The 2011 census recorded 30,151 Swedish-born residents in England, 543 in Wales, 1,748 in Scotland and 169 in Northern Ireland. The Office for National Statistics estimates that 38,000 Swedish-born people were resident in the UK in 2017.

In 2001, over 82% of all local authorities in the UK registered at least one Swedish-born resident, with the majority being concentrated in London (9,477) and South East England (4,786). Within London the affluent areas of Richmond, Hyde Park, Kensington and Chelsea had amongst the largest Swedish-born populations in the country. Outside of London and the South East, 1,855 Swedish-born people were living in the East of England, 1,432 in South West England and 1,188 in Scotland.

The Church of Sweden has a presence in the cities of London, Liverpool and Middlesbrough. The Swedish Church in London which is part of the Church of Sweden Abroad claims to have 3,800 followers and runs the Ulrika Eleonora Church in Marylebone, as well as the Seamen's Church in Rotherhithe. The oldest surviving Church of Sweden church in the UK is the Gustav Adolf Church which was built in 1883 in the port city of Liverpool. This specific church was constructed to accommodate the Scandinavian seamen visiting the city alongside the growing number of Scandinavian migrants travelling to North America via Liverpool - a figure that reached 50,000 per year during the late 19th century.

== Notable individuals ==
- Amanda Aldridge: opera singer and teacher who composed under the pseudonym Montague Ring, African-American and Swedish descent
- Luranah Aldridge: opera singer in the United States and Europe, who unofficially "broke the colour barrier" for black opera singers in 1896, well before Grace Bumbry, African-American and Swedish descent
- Camilla Arfwedson: actress; Swedish descent
- Carl Aschan: Swedish-born intelligence officer and spy during World War II
- Prince Alexander: elder son of Prince Paul, who served as Regent of Yugoslavia in the 1930s, and his wife, Princess Olga of Greece and Denmark, Finnish, Serbian, Russian, Greek, German and Danish descent
- Martin Beckman: Swedish-born draughtsman/painter, colonel, chief engineer and master gunner
- Tom Blomqvist: professional racing driver, and BMW Motorsport works driver, currently competing in Formula E with NIO 333, Swedish and New Zealand descent
- Victoria Bundsen: Swedish-born opera singer (alto)
- Jessica Castles: artistic gymnast who represents Sweden in international competitions; 2019 European Games floor exercise bronze medalist and the 2018 Swedish national champion; Swedish and Northern Ireland descent
- James Cyriax: doctor known as the "father of orthopedic medicine", Swedish descent
- George Sackville-West, 5th Earl De La Warr: courtier and Tory Party politician, Swedish descent
- Oliver Dovin: footballer who plays as a goalkeeper for Hammarby IF and Allsvenskan, Nigerian and Swedish descent
- R. Palme Dutt: leading journalist and theoretician in the Communist Party of Great Britain, Indian, Swedish and Scottish descent
- Perrie Edwards: singer, songwriter, and member of Little Mix, Swedish, Irish and Scottish descent
- Rebecca Ferguson: actress of English, Northern Irish and Scottish descent
- Mark Florman: businessman and entrepreneur, co-founder and former CEO of the merchant banking group Maizels, Westerberg & Co., Swedish descent
- Stephen Graham: actor, Swedish and Jamaican descent
- John Gustafson: bass guitar player and singer; member of the Spice Girls, Swedish, Spanish and French descent
- Gustav Holst: composer, arranger and teacher; best known for his orchestral suite The Planets, Swedish, German and Latvian descent
- Imogen Holst: composer, arranger, conductor, teacher, musicologist, and festival administrator; only child of the composer Gustav Holst; known for her educational work at Dartington Hall; German, Latvian and Swedish descent
- Maya Jama: television and radio presenter; Somali and Swedish descent
- Jonas Kellgren: physician and the first professor of rheumatology, Russian and Swedish descent
- Jessica Kellgren-Fozard: YouTuber and television personality; American, Russian and Swedish descent
- Richard Kempenfelt: rear admiral who gained a reputation as a naval innovator; known for his victory against the French at the Second Battle of Ushant and for his death when HMS Royal George accidentally sank at Portsmouth the following year; Swedish descent
- Si King: television presenter; one half of the Hairy Bikers with Dave Myers, German, Italian and Swedish descent
- Sonja Kristina: songwriter, musician and actress, best known for starring in the seminal 1960s musical Hair, and for being the lead vocalist of the 1970s progressive rock band Curved Air, Swedish descent
- Steven Larsson: handball player; born in Scarborough in North Yorkshire but moved to Linköping in Sweden as a youngster, Swedish descent
- Freda Lingstrom: BBC Television producer and executive, Swedish descent
- Olivia Llewellyn: actress, best known for her television appearances portraying Isabel Danforth in The Lizzie Borden Chronicles and Mina Harker in Penny Dreadful, Welsh and Swedish descent
- Marguerite Lundgren: German-born eurythmist and anthroposophist, Swedish descent
- PewDiePie: Swedish YouTuber who lived in the United Kingdom from 2013 to 2022

== See also ==
- Scandinavian migration to Britain
- Swedish churches in London
- The Swedish School in London
- Anglo-Swedish Society
- Sweden–United Kingdom relations
- Swedish Americans
