= Heather Ingman =

British academic, novelist and journalist

Heather Elizabeth Ingman (born 26 December 1953) is a British academic, noted for her work on Irish and British women's writing, the Irish short story, gender studies and modernism. Also a novelist and journalist, Ingman has worked in Ireland and the UK, especially at Trinity College Dublin, where she is an adjunct professor of English and research fellow in gender studies.

== Early life and education ==
Ingman was born and brought up in Stockton-on-Tees, a market town in County Durham in the north of England, one of two daughters of David and Elizabeth Ingman (née Joan Elizabeth Walker, married 1951). Her father was executive chairman of the British Waterways Board from 1987 to 1993; he led the drive for new legislation to allow the board to extend its activities, opened one of the Board's first major commercial developments, at Limehouse, and was awarded a CBE in 1993. His father, Charles, was director of one of the main local enterprises, Power Gas Group (now part of Johnson Matthey).

Ingman attended Teesside High School, completing school in 1972, then studied at Bedford College of the University of London, graduating in 1977 with a BA in French and English from the university. In 1980 she was awarded a PhD in French Renaissance poetry and drama by the same university.

== Career ==
=== Academic ===
Ingman first taught in the School of French at Trinity College Dublin (TCD) from the early 1980s for ten years. She moved back to the UK for her second PhD, and took up a post at the University of Hull, as lecturer in English, specialising in women's studies, for eight years. She secured her PhD from Loughborough University, on women's inter-war fiction, in 1996.

She returned, after about ten years, to Dublin, to work at the Department of English at Trinity College, in time becoming an adjunct professor. She later also took up a post at the Centre for Women's Studies within TCD; she is currently a visiting research fellow at what is now the Centre for Gender and Women's Studies. Ingman also speaks regularly at conferences, has been interviewed on radio, and supervises and has acted as external examiner for PhD candidates in at least five universities in the UK, Ireland and the USA.

Ingman is also an Honorary Research Fellow of the Research Institute of Irish and Scottish Studies at the University of Aberdeen.

After an early monograph, Ingman published academic papers regularly over more than fifteen years, and wrote, edited or co-edited eight academic texts from 1998 to 2018, several of which are major topic surveys, widely held in academic libraries.

=== Literary ===
Ingman published her first novel in 1987, then returned to the form in 1994, publishing six books in under five years. After a gap of nearly 20 years, she published a new novel in 2017.

== Publications ==
=== Academic works ===
==== Books ====
- 2018: A History of Modern Irish Women's Literature (Ingman and Clíona Ó Gallchoir, eds) (Cambridge: Cambridge University Press, ISBN 9781107131101)
- 2018: Ageing in Irish Writing: Strangers to Themselves (New York: Palgrave Macmillan, ISBN 9783319964294)
- 2013: Irish Women's Fiction: From Edgeworth to Enright (Newbridge: Irish Academic Press, ISBN 9780716531487, "first ever single-volume survey of Irish women's fiction, exploring the evolution of themes and styles, as well as the lives of the authors, with all major fiction genres, including children's writing, crime fiction, and chick lit")
- 2009 (online edition 2010): A History of the Irish Short Story (Cambridge: Cambridge University Press, ISBN 9780511770418)
- 2007: Twentieth-Century Fiction by Irish Women: Nation and Gender (London: Routledge, ISBN 9780754635383)
- 2004: "Women's Spirituality in the Twentieth Century: An Exploration through Fiction" (Bern and Oxford: Peter Lang, ISBN 9783039101498)
- 1999: Mothers and Daughters in the Twentieth Century: A Literary Anthology (Ingman as editor) (Edinburgh: Edinburgh University Press, ISBN 9780748611751, containing fiction, poetry and prose with multi-cultural perspectives on the mother-daughter relationship, including feminist and psychoanalytical theory)
- 1998: Women's Fiction Between the Wars: Mothers, Daughters and Writing (Edinburgh University Press, ISBN 9780748609406, with critical analysis of Virginia Woolf, Dorothy Richardson, Ivy Compton-Burnett, Elizabeth Bowen, Rose Macaulay and Jean Rhys)
- 1988: Machiavelli in Sixteenth-Century French Fiction (Bern and New York: Peter Lang Publishing, as part of American University Studies – Series 3, Comparative Literature)

==== Journal articles and chapters ====
A sample collection of articles, all from peer-reviewed works.

- 2018: "'A Living Writer': Elizabeth Bowen and Katherine Mansfield" in The Elizabeth Bowen Review, volume 1, pp. 30–41
- 2018: "'Strangers to Themselves': Ageing, the Individual and the Community in the Fiction of Iris Murdoch, John Banville and John McGahern" in Irish University Review, volume 48 (2), pp. 202–218
- 2017: "Silence, Language and Power in Elizabeth Bowen's Work" in Silence in Modern Irish Literature (M. McAteer, ed.), Brill Rodophi, pp. 49–61
- 2017: "Spirituality in Mrs Dalloway and To the Lighthouse" in Virginia Woolf (J. Acheson, ed.), Palgrave, pp. 32–45
- 2016: "The Short Story in Ireland to 1945: A National Literature" in The English Short Story (D. Head, ed.), Cambridge University Press, pp. 168–184
- 2016: "The Short Story in Ireland since 1945: A Modernizing Tradition" in The English Short Story (D. Head, ed.), Cambridge University Press, pp. 185–201
- 2015: "Virginia Woolf and Ageing: The Years and Between the Acts" in the Virginia Woolf Bulletin (49), pp. 17–24
- 2015: "The Irish Short Story" in Oxford Bibliographies in British and Irish Literature (A. Hadfield, ed.), Oxford University Press
- 2014: "The Female Writer in Short Stories by Irish Women" in The Irish Short Story: Traditions and Trends (E. D'hoker and S. Eggermont, eds), Bern and Geneva: Peter Lang, pp. 259–78
- 2013: Review of "Imperial Refugee: Olivia Manning's Fictions of War" by Eve Patten, in the Irish University Review, vol. 43 (1), pp. 252–55
- 2013: "Aliens: London in Irish Women's Writing" in Irish Writing London, vol. 2 (T. Herron, ed.), London and New York: Bloomsbury, pp. 47–63
- 2013: "Masculinities in Mary Lavin's short stories" in Mary Lavin (E. D'hoker, ed.), Dublin: Irish Academic Press, pp. 30–48
- 2011: Entries for Jennifer Johnston and Anne Enright in the Literary Encyclopedia, ISSN 1747-678X
- 2010: "Religion and the occult in women's modernism" in the Cambridge Companion to Modernist Women Writers (M.T. Linett, ed.), Cambridge: Cambridge University Press, pp. 187–202
- 2010: "'Like Shakespeare,' she added ...'or isn't it': Shakespearean Echoes in Elizabeth Bowen's Portrait of Ireland" in Shakespeare and the Irish Writer (J. Clare and S. O'Neill, eds), Dublin: UCD Press, pp. 153–165
- 2009: "Maternal Subjectivity: a Kristevan Reading of Anne Enright's Memoir, Making Babies: Stumbling into Motherhood" in From the Personal to the Political: Toward a New Theory of Maternal Narrative (A. O'Reilly and S.C. Bizzini, eds), Selinsgrove: Susquehanna University Press, pp. 225–37
- 2007: "The Evolution of the Mother-Daughter Story in Three Novels by Irish Women: From Abject to Artist" in Women's Writing in Western Europe: Gender and Generation (A. Giorgio and J. Waters, eds), Newcastle: Cambridge Scholars Publishing, pp. 186–199
- 2006: "The Artist, the Traveller, the Lover: Identity and Irish Nationalism in the Novels of Kate O'Brien (1897–1974)" in Identity and Cultural Translation: Writing across the Borders of Englishness (A.G. Macedo and M.E. Pereira, eds), Bern and Oxford: Peter Lang, pp. 201–212
- 2005: "Nature, gender and nation: An ecofeminist reading of two novels by Irish women" in Irish Studies Review (British Association for Irish Studies), 13 (4), pp. 517–530
- 2002: "Edna O'Brien: Stretching the Nation's Boundaries" in Irish Studies Review (BAIS), 10 (3), pp. 253–266
- 2001: "The Case of Virginia Woolf: Women, Spirituality and Writing in the Inter-War Period in England" in Towards a Different Transcendence (K. Biezeveld, Anne-Claire Mulder, eds), Bern and Oxford: Peter Lang, pp. 187–214

=== Fiction ===
- 1987: The Dance of the Muses: A Novel on the Life of Pierre Ronsard (London: Peter Owen, ISBN 9780720606799)
- 1994: The Quest (the only work published as Heather von Prondzynski) (Dublin: Attic Press, ISBN 9781855940383, novel)
- 1994: Sara (Dublin: Poolbeg Press, ISBN 9781853713507, novel, the title character dealing with infertility and adoption from Ecuador)
- 1995: Anna (Dublin: Poolbeg Press, ISBN 9781853714504, novel)
- 1996: Survival (Dublin: Poolbeg Press, ISBN 9781853715440, novel, "a contemporary tale set in England, Germany and Ireland")
- 1996: Waiting at the Gate (London: Fourth Estate, ISBN 9781857024807, novel, "featuring a group of mothers who meet and bond while waiting at the school gate, the lead a Tory MP's wife, with children of 7 and 3, the eldest autistic")
- 1998: Stealing Heaven (London: Fourth Estate, ISBN 9781857026573, novel, "about two sisters returning to Yorkshire after their mother's death")
- 2017: Lovers and Dancers (London: Endeavour Press, ISBN 9781546808008)
- 2022: Natalia's Song (Auchterless, Scotland: Knockleith Publishing, ISBN 9781739196813)

=== Journalism ===
Ingman wrote a number of "Englishwoman's Diary" columns for the Irish Times in the early 2000s, and then and later wrote literary articles and reviews for the paper.

== Personal life ==
Ingman is married to Ferdinand von Prondzynski, second president of Dublin City University and then Principal of Robert Gordon University. She has lived in the UK, Ireland, France and Ecuador. While working at the Universities of Hull and York, part-time, she lived in Yorkshire, then between Dublin (where a house on the DCU campus was part of von Prondzynski's contract) and Westmeath (the family lived partly at, and later took over, Knockdrin Castle outside Mullingar, Co. Westmeath, from von Prondzynski's family). Knockdrin Castle and its estate were placed on the market in 2017. As of 2025, Ingman lives and works in rural Aberdeenshire.

Ingman and von Prondzynski have two sons, the elder (born 1989) adopted from Ecuador, the younger born in 1991 in the United Kingdom, educated at the University of Buckingham and now working as a copywriter.

== External sources ==
- Trinity College Dublin – Staff Profile – Heather Ingman, with details of office at TCD, teaching and research interests and PhD supervision work
- Trinity College Dublin – Research – Heather Ingman, notes on PhDs and selected publications
- ResearchGate – Heather Ingman, with details of 57 research works
- The Literary Encyclopedia – Contributors – Heather Ingman, with summary of career and interests
- Heather Ingman official site – About Heather Ingman, with career and media data
