= Michelle Essomé =

American business executive

- Born: Michelle Kathryn Taylor; October 1968 (age 57–58); New York, New York, United States
- Occupation: Banker
- Title: former Chief Executive Officer, African Private Equity and Venture Capital Association (AVCA)

Michelle Kathryn Essomé (née Taylor) is a former investment banker and the ex-CEO of the African Private Equity and Venture Capital Association (AVCA). She is also an ambassador of Build Africa, an international development and education charity based in London, England.

== Early life and education ==
Essomé was born in New York in October 1968. She was raised in Washington D.C. and also lived in Niger for a short period as a child.

Essomé was initially interested in politics, but, during her time at Howard University, her interest switched to finance. Consequently, she transferred to the Howard University's School of Business, where she obtained a BBA in Finance and was a recipient of a Wall Street Journal scholarship.

Later on, whilst working for Goldman Sachs, she won an MBA scholarship at Columbia Business School, here she was a Robert F. Toigo fellow. She graduated with an MBA in Finance from Columbia Business School, Essomé is the inaugural recipient of the Columbia Business School Young Alumni of the Year Award (2014).

== Career ==
Essomé's investment banking career has spanned over 30 years with roles in equities, fixed income and investment management. She has worked in the US, UK and France.

After university, Essomé started her career at Merrill Lynch in New York. She later moved to Goldman Sachs and, after business school, to Chase, (later JPMorgan Chase), where she spent time in London in Global Syndicated Finance and on the Securitisation Team. After leaving JPMorgan Chase, she went to Paris and worked for a woman’s organisation, promoting women in business. She was then recruited back to Lehman Bros in London in a strategic role to attract more women and ethnic minorities to the bank. Afterwards, she moved to Nomura. She was previously a Director at Neuberger Berman

In September 2011, Essomé was appointed CEO of the African Private Equity and Venture Capital Association (AVCA), a pan-African industry body which aims to catalyse investment in Africa.

== Personal life ==
Hobbies include running, swimming, reading and travelling.
