= Build Africa =

British charity focussed on African development

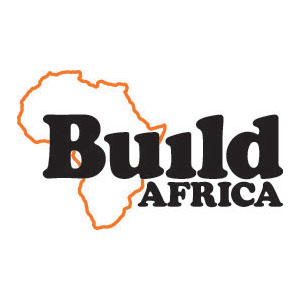
- Formation: 1978
- Type: Charity, Nonprofit
- Purpose: International development, Poverty, Education, Gender equality
- Location: London, UK
- Region served: Kenya and Uganda
- Website: www.build-africa.org

Build Africa formerly International Care & Relief (ICR), and International Christian Relief, is a British charity based in London, England, involved in international development and education.

The NGO works to improve access to quality primary education in rural Africa, with projects focussed in Kenya and Uganda, East Africa.

Build Africa state that they "believe in the power of education to help end poverty", and work to ensure vulnerable children in Africa get the right infrastructure, teaching and family support so they can get the most from their time at school and go on to lead productive, healthy and happy lives.

== History ==
Founded as a branch of International Christian Relief, the charity broke off from the American parent body and became independent under the name International Care & Relief, which enabled it to continue to use its recognized acronym, ICR. At the same time as becoming an independent organisation, ICR moved away from aid relief, choosing instead to focus on long-term development operating specifically East Africa.

2004 - ICR launched its first sustainable education program, called Build a School, aiming to promote access to education in rural areas of Kenya and Uganda. Build a School worked with 11 schools in its first year.
2007 - ICR re-branded to become Build Africa to reflect the organization's interest in sustainable development.
2009 - Build Africa was awarded 'Best International Charity' by the Charity Times, and continued to expand its programs.
2013 - Build Africa supported 65,962 children in 148 school communities, trained 3,063 people in hygiene and sanitation, and worked with 5,378 farmers towards better agricultural practices.
2017 - Build Africa secured support from the Department For International Development UK Aid Match, for its Mums Read, Kids Succeed campaign. The campaign helps young mothers in rural Uganda to learn literacy skills and access healthcare and nutrition services.

== Approaches ==
Build Africa partners with remote and rural communities where children are leaving school without vital basic skills. Their approach then aims to help parents and teachers to create sustainable, effective schools and to nurture their children's learning.

Build Africa's work has two overall aims: Improve access to education for children and improve the quality of education that they receive.

== Ambassadors ==
Michelle Essomé is an ambassador of the charity.

== Patrons ==
Build Africa has a number of patrons who support the charity's work, including: Clive Myrie, Tamzin Merchant, Shiulie Ghosh and Mark Florman.
