= Shiulie Ghosh =

British television journalist and author

- Born: 28 September 1968 (age 57); Leeds, West Yorkshire, England
- Occupation: Television journalist
- Employer: Aero Productions Ltd
- Spouse: Simon Torkington

Shiulie Ghosh (Bengali: শিউলি ঘোষ, /ʃjuli ghɔːʃ/, born 28 September 1968) is a freelance television journalist, conference moderator, author and director of a media services company.

Shiulie formerly worked for the BBC, ITN and Aljazeera. She moderates debates for clients including the World Health Organization and the UN. She also writes young adult fiction novels, and is a part-time newscaster at the TRT World bureau in London. She freelances as an anchor on the evening news hour programme.

== Career ==
Early Career

Ghosh began her career as a programme assistant at Radio Cleveland.

In 1990 she was accepted as BBC News trainee and worked in various posts at the BBC for the next eight years.

In 1998 she joined ITV News, progressing to Senior Correspondent and eventually being appointed Home Affairs Editor. In 2001 she was named Best Television News Journalist at the British Telecom Ethnic Multicultural Media Awards (EMMA).

Al Jazeera English

In 2006, Ghosh joined Al Jazeera English as a news presenter. She was the opening anchor on the station's launch in Doha on 15 November 2006. In addition, she hosted Every Woman, a show focusing on women's issues from around the world, for which she won the Editor's Choice Media Excellence Award from the Association of International Broadcasting.

Ghosh also presented the current affairs program 'Inside Story'.

Ghosh was featured in Qatar's winning 2022 FIFA World cup bid presentation video.

She left Aljazeera at the end of 2015 and set up a media services company in the UK, Aero Productions Ltd. She is now a conference host and moderator, as well as a freelance presenter for TRT World in London. She is also a successful author, with several books published since 2018. They include the young adult urban fantasy series 'Daughter of Kali', the paranormal romance 'Kingdom of Salt', and the YA urban fantasy adventure 'Mark of the Djinn'.

== Personal life ==
Early Life

Ghosh was born in Leeds, though the family moved to India soon afterwards. The family returned and resettled in the north east of England several years later.

Education

She was educated at the Avenue Primary School, in Nunthorpe, Middlesbrough, and then at Teesside High School. She graduated from the University of Kent with an honours degree in law. She was made a Master of Arts by the University of Teesside in 2003.

Family

Ghosh is married to Simon Torkington, a former BBC News editor, and they have one daughter.

Interests

Ghosh is a patron of the charity Build Africa which supports education for children in Uganda and Kenya.
