= Teesside High School =

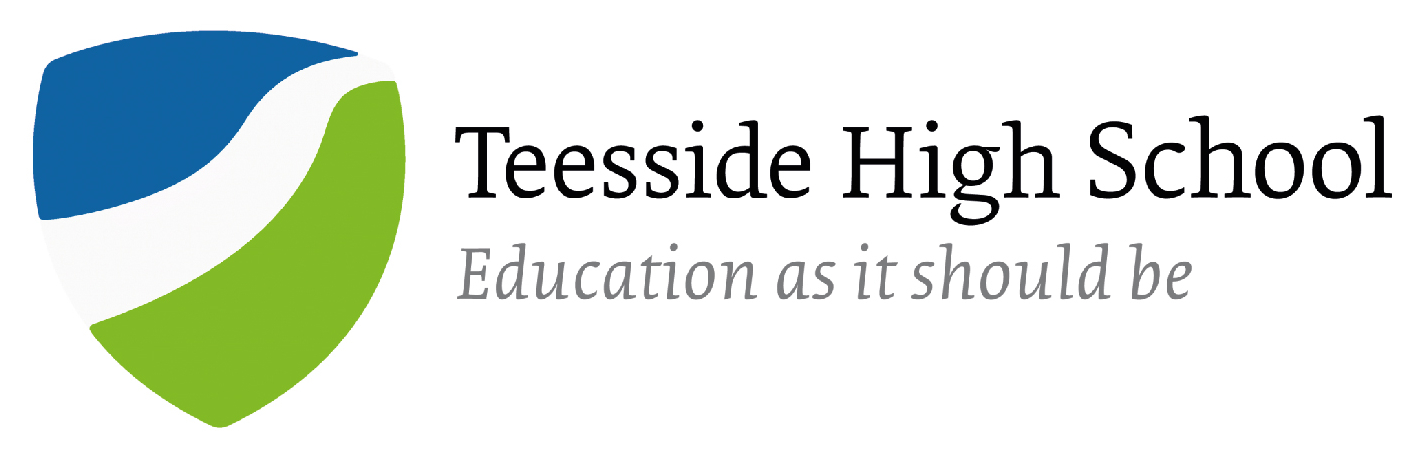

Location
- The Avenue; Stockton-on-Tees, County Durham, TS16 9AT; England
- Coordinates: 54°31′41″N 1°20′34″W

Information
- Type: Independent day school
- Motto: Education as it should be.
- Established: 1883
- Head Teacher: K Mackenzie
- Gender: Mixed
- Age: 3 to 18
- Enrolment: 364
- Houses: Cleveland; Victoria; Woodside
- Former Pupils: Teesside High Former Students' Association
- Website: http://www.teessidehigh.co.uk/

Teesside High School is a co-educational private day-school in Eaglescliffe, Stockton-on-Tees, England.

== Introduction ==
Teesside High School is an independent day school located in Eaglescliffe, Stockton-on-Tees, in northeast England. The school is co-educational and has been rated as 'Outstanding' by the Independent Schools Inspectorate, which indicates a high level of academic performance and educational standards.

Teesside High School provides education for boys and girls from the ages of 3 to 18, covering four different departments: Early Years and Pre-Prep, Prep School, Senior School, and Sixth Form. All departments are located on the same school site.

== History ==
The grounds which Teesside High School occupies were originally home to The Cleveland School, founded in 1938 and housed in Woodside Hall on the banks of River Tees from 1945.

Queen Victoria High School was founded in 1883 and was located at Yarm Lane, Stockton.

In 1970, The Cleveland School merged with Queen Victoria High School to form Teesside High School.

== Diamond Model ==
A system of education evolved towards the end of the twentieth century to address gender differences in education, the Diamond Model. This was outlined in the Daily Telegraph Guide to Independent Schools and the Service Parents' Guide. Teesside High School adopted this model in 2005.

Boys and girls were taught separately for core subjects from year 5 through to the completion of GCSE at 16. Boys and girls mixed socially, both in terms of organized activities and unstructured time during breaks in the school day. In 2015, the school moved away from the Diamond Model to become fully co-educational.

== Notable former pupils ==
- Shiulie Ghosh, TV presenter
- Hazel Hall (information scientist), Professor of Social Informatics
- Heather Ingman, Professor of English, novelist and journalist
- Charlotte Riley, actress
- Amelia Lily, a contestant in series 8 of the X Factor
- Dr Lara Menzies, Neurologist
