= Eve Patten =

Irish writer and Professor of English

- Born: Belfast, Northern Ireland
- Education: Trinity College Dublin (PhD)
- Occupations: Writer, professor
- Employer: Trinity College Dublin

Eve Veronica Patten is an Irish writer and Professor of English at Trinity College Dublin.

== Biography ==
Eve Patten is Professor of English at Trinity College Dublin, where she has worked since 1996. Patten was born in Belfast. She got her degrees from Oxford University and Trinity College, Dublin. She has edited and written books on nineteenth- and twentieth-century Irish and British literature. Patten also writes reviews for The Irish Times. She is a Fellow of Trinity College Dublin and was appointed the Director of the Trinity Long Room Hub for Arts and Humanities Research in 2020.

Patten was elected a Member of the Royal Irish Academy in 2024.

== Bibliography ==
- Samuel Ferguson and the Culture of Nineteenth-Century Ireland (2004)
- Imperial Refugee: Olivia Manning's Fictions of War (2012)
- Irish Studies (2003)
- The Cambridge Companion to the Irish Novel (2006)
- Irish Literature in Transition, Volume 5: 1940–1980 (Cambridge University Press, 2020), editor
- Ireland, West to East: Irish Cultural Connections with Central and Eastern Europe (2013), co-edited with Aidan O'Malley
- The Perils of Print Culture: Book, Print and Publishing History in Theory and Practice (Palgrave Macmillan, 2014), co-edited with Jason McElligott,
- Ireland's "Two Cultures" Debate: Victorian Science and the Literary Revival (2003)
