= Tordoff =

Tordoff is a surname. Notable people with the surname include:

- Geoffrey Tordoff, Baron Tordoff (born 1928), British businessman and politician
- Gerry Tordoff (1929–2008), British first-class cricketer
- Harrison B. Tordoff (1923–2008), American ornithologist and conservationist
- Michael Tordoff (born 1956), British psychobiologist
- Rennie Fritchie, Baroness Fritchie (born 1942), British civil servant
- Sam Tordoff (born 1989), British racing car driver
- Chris Tordoff, Irish actor and comedian also known as Francis "the Viper" Higgins
