= Mark Florman =

British businessman (born 1958)

- Born: 2 November 1958 (age 67); London, England
- Education: Harrow School; London School of Economics
- Occupation: CEO Time Partners Limited
- Spouse: Alexia Florman
- Children: 3
- Website: https://www.markflorman.com/

Mark Florman (born 2 November 1958) is a British businessman. He is the founder and CEO of Time Partners Limited. Florman led the review of governance for UK public bodies in 2021, and has worked to drive efficiency in the public sector through the adoption of private sector practices.

== Education and professional background ==
Florman was educated at Harrow before attending the London School of Economics.

In 1992, Florman was co-founder and later CEO of Maizels, Westerberg & Co. He sold the firm to create Nordea Securities.

In 2009, Florman co-founded 8Miles, an African private equity firm, with Bob Geldof and Kofi Annan.

In 2013, Mark Florman co-founded the investment and corporate advisory firm Time Partners. The company advises investors, families and other owners of substantial assets on long-term investment strategies and transactions in private markets. The firm worked with the London School of Economics to develop the concept of the External Rate of Return, which aims to measure an investment’s impact on society, the environment, and the economy.

On 20 March 2015, Mark Florman was appointed to the BBC Trust as Trustee for England. Florman's term began on 1 April 2015 and ended in April 2017.

In 2018, he was appointed as a non-executive director of the UK Home Office, with his term ending in 2021.

== The External Rate of Return ==
In February 2016, Mark Florman in conjunction with Dr Robyn Klingler-Vidra, King's College London and LSE Enterprise with Mr Martim Jacinto Facada; created the External Rate of Return (ERR), an inclusive, transparency index for measuring the overall impact of business activities upon the economy and society in general.

== Philanthropic activities ==
Florman co-founded the UK social justice and poverty think tank Centre for Social Justice in 2004 alongside Iain Duncan Smith, Tim Montgomerie and Philippa Stroud.

He is life Ambassador to the Centre for Social Justice and Build Africa.

== Academic Relationships ==
Florman is a distinguished fellow at INSEAD Global Private Equity Initiative, a visiting senior fellow at the London School of Economics and a visiting professor at the Policy Institute King's College London.

== Political work ==
Florman has worked as an advisor to a number of Governments, including the UK, Sweden, Nigeria and Saudi Arabia, to build sustainable business, venture capital and investment frameworks for the purpose of job creation.
