= Maizels, Westerberg & Co. =

- Company type: Limited Company
- Industry: Financial services
- Founded: 1992
- Defunct: 1999
- Fate: Acquired
- Successor: Merita Nordbanken (now Nordea)
- Headquarters: London, Stockholm, Helsinki and Oslo, Nordic countries
- Key people: Spencer Maizels, Sten Westerberg, Mark Florman, Peter Wikström, Tomas Söderström & Jonas de Verdier
- Products: corporate finance, mergers, acquisitions and divestitures

Maizels, Westerberg & Co. (MW & Co.) was a Nordic boutique investment bank, specialising in major corporate finance transactions in the Nordic countries.

The major focus of the firm was owner-driven transactions, restructurings, mergers, acquisitions and divestitures. Spencer Maizels was the company's first CEO, but died aged just 43 in 1995. He was succeeded by Mark Florman, who had been one of the driving forces behind the establishment of the firm. In 1999 the firm was acquired by Finnish-Swedish bank Merita Nordbanken (now Nordea).

== History ==
The firm was established by six former employees of Enskilda Secusrities: Spencer Maizels, Sten Westerberg, Mark Florman, Peter Wikström, Tomas Söderström & Jonas de Verdier. Sten Westerberg had been undersecretary of state at the Ministry of Finance (Sweden) and had strong government connections.

Maizels, Westerberg & Co. was often described as a "corporate finance boutique". The term belies the position the firm had as a leading player in the Nordic mergers and acquisitions market. The Volvo/Procordia deal, which was the largest demerger in the history of Sweden, got the firm off to a running start. The emergency restructuring resulting in the sale of four subsidiaries belonging to the Swedish co-operative KF (Kooperativa Förbundet) soon followed as did a string of high-profile deals.

At the end of 1999, Maizels, Westerberg & Co. was bought by the Finnish-Swedish bank Merita Nordbanken (now Nordea). The resulting investment bank was named Maizels Merita Nordbanken and grew from 30 to 70 employees. The joint chief executives were Mark Florman and executive vice-president of Merita Nordbanken, Björn Carlsson. Nordbanken's M&A advisory team was demerged from the bank's Stockholm office and moved into Maizel's new office.

== Associated Companies ==
- Hambro, Maizels, Westerberg & Co. Ltd. (London)
- Heggeli, Maizels, Westerberg & Co. Ltd. (Oslo)
