= Sweden–United Kingdom relations =

- Sweden: United Kingdom

Diplomatic mission
- British Embassy, Stockholm: Swedish Embassy, London

Envoy
- Ambassador Judith Gough: Ambassador Torbjörn Sohlström

The United Kingdom and the Sweden maintain bilateral relations. Both countries share common membership of the Council of Europe, the European Court of Human Rights, the International Criminal Court, the Joint Expeditionary Force, NATO, the OECD, the OSCE, the United Nations, and the World Trade Organization. Bilaterally the two countries have a Double Taxation Convention, a Mutual Defence Agreement, and a Strategic Partnership. Additionally, the United Kingdom holds Observer status of the BEAC, CBSS and AC.

== History ==
=== Viking Age ===
The earliest wave of migration from present-day Sweden, came from the Viking invasion of Britain in the year 793 when Viking pagans from Scandinavia (present-day Denmark, Norway, and Sweden) started raiding and settling around the British Isles. Viking raids occurred up and down the largely undefended east coast of England and Scotland during the eighth and ninth centuries. Scandinavian settlements became established over the entire island of Great Britain, the most important of which was Jórvík (now York). Scandinavian influence is evident in the UK even to this day and many millions of Britons have some Scandinavian heritage (especially in Northern England, Eastern England, Scotland and the Shetland Islands).

Another early recording of Swedes in England can be found on the so called England runestones which describe Swedish Vikings taking gold, Danegeld, and tributes in England. Almost all Runestones of this period mentioning England are found in modern day Sweden.

=== Beowulf ===
One of the earliest mentions of present day Sweden in old English literature comes in the form of the epic poem of Beowulf. The story is set in Scandinavia. Beowulf, a hero of the Geats, (Swedish Viking tribe), comes to the aid of Hrothgar, the king of the Danes, whose mead hall in Heorot has been under attack by a monster known as Grendel. After Beowulf slays him, Grendel's mother attacks the hall and is then also defeated. Victorious, Beowulf goes home to Geatland (Götaland in modern Sweden) and becomes king of the Geats. Fifty years later, Beowulf defeats a dragon but is mortally wounded in the battle. After his death, his attendants cremate his body and erect a tower on a headland in his memory.

=== Colonial era ===
As part of the Continental System, Sweden was forced to declare war on the UK by Napoleon - however the Anglo-Swedish war of 1810–1812 existed only on paper and was entirely bloodless. In the Treaty of Stockholm of 1813, Britain ceded Guadeloupe to Sweden in exchange for Swedish support against Napoleon in the War of the Sixth Coalition and trading rights in major Swedish cities. Swedish rule was brief as the island was ceded to France in the 1814 Treaty of Paris.

=== Migration ===
During the late 19th and early 20th centuries, many Swedes emigrated to the United States and the majority of Swedes sailed from Gothenburg to Kingston upon Hull before travelling to Liverpool or Southampton to continue their journey to North America. This created a significant Swedish presence in these cities, so much so that Swedish churches were built to cater to the dynamic communities. Although most emigrants eventually left the ports for the US, some remained in Britain and started their new lives a stage early.

== Defence and security ==
The Joint Expeditionary Force (JEF) is a United Kingdom-led multinational military partnership formed for rapid response and expeditionary operations, primarily focused on Northern Europe and the Baltic Sea region. The JEF was officially launched as a NATO initiative at the 2014 NATO Wales Summit when seven countries - Denmark, Estonia, Latvia, Lithuania, the Netherlands, Norway, and the United Kingdom - signed a foundational Letter of Intent to establish the force. Sweden joined the JEF in the summer of 2017 alongside Finland, expanding the membership to nine nations. In 2021, Iceland became the tenth member.

Since 2022, Sweden, along with Finland, is in a mutual defence treaty with the United Kingdom. In 2022, British Prime Minister Boris Johnson arrived in Sweden and granted Sweden security assurances for the duration of its NATO membership process. In July 2022, the United Kingdom fully approved Sweden's application for NATO membership.

== Diplomatic missions ==
Of the United Kingdom

- Stockholm (Embassy)
- Gothenburg (Consulate General)
- Malmö (Consulate General)

Of Sweden

- London (Embassy),
- Gibraltar (Consulate General)

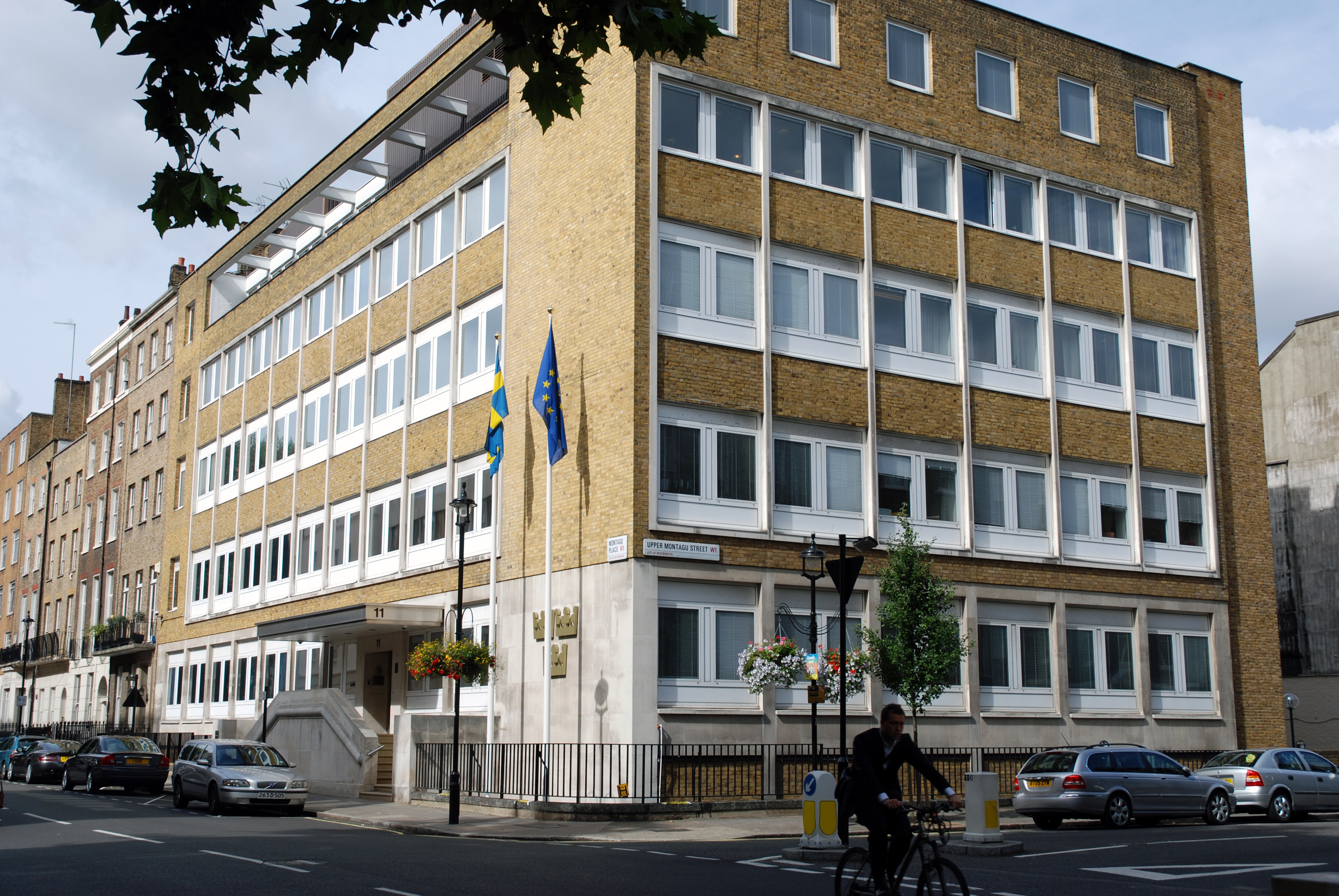
Embassy of Sweden in London

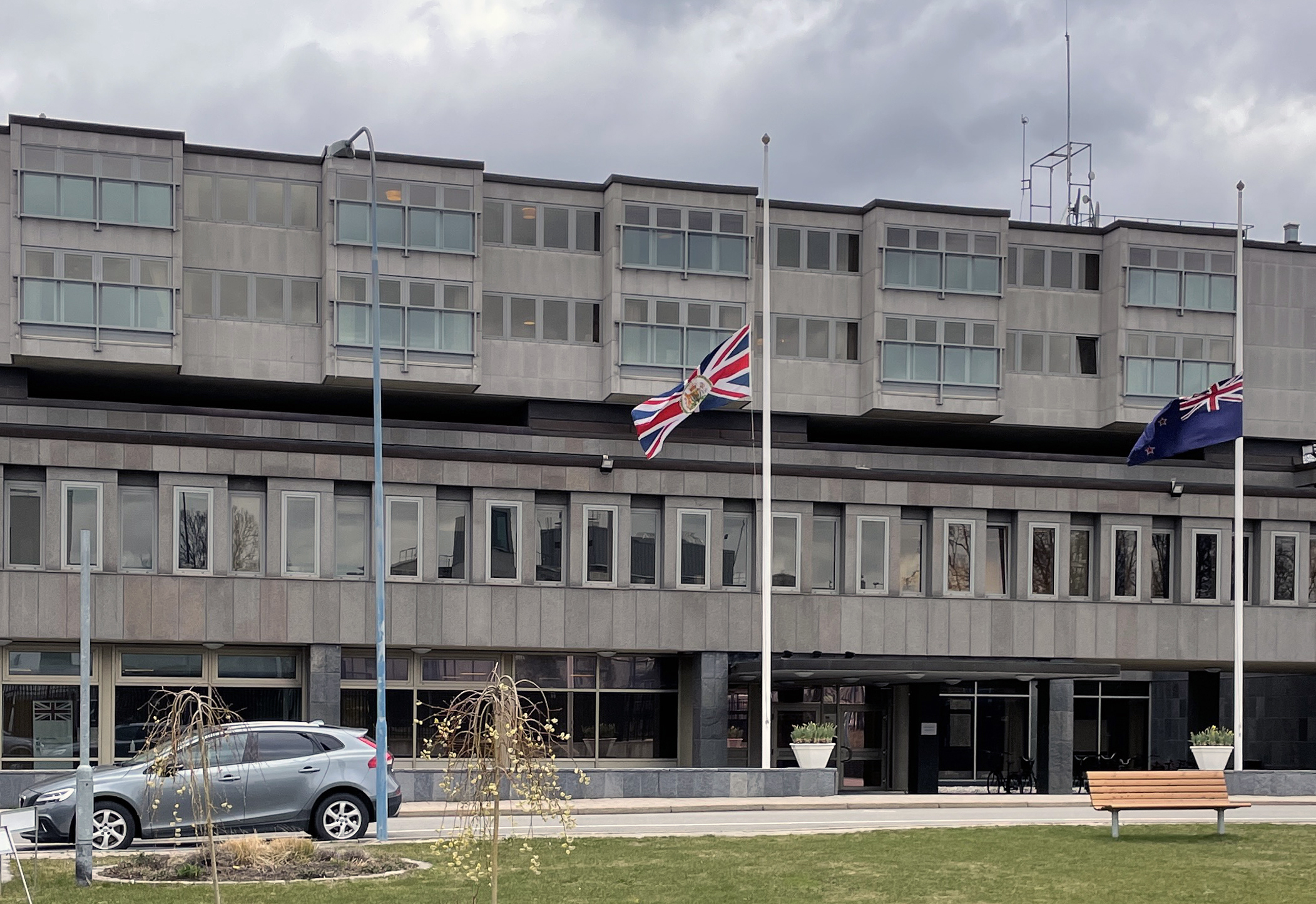
Embassy of the United Kingdom in Stockholm

The British embassy in North Korea based in Pyongyang is located in the same building as the Swedish embassy.

== State visits ==
Two official states visits each between UK and Sweden took place during the reign of Elizabeth II. Former King Gustaf VI Adolf and Queen Louise made a visit to Elizabeth between 28 June to 1 July 1954. In return she made an official visit to Sweden visiting Stockholm and Gothenburg between 8 and 10 June 1956. Later on, the current monarch Carl XVI Gustaf made an official visit to the UK between 8 and 11 July 1975. Elizabeth later returned the visit between 25 and 28 May 1983.

== Monarchy ==
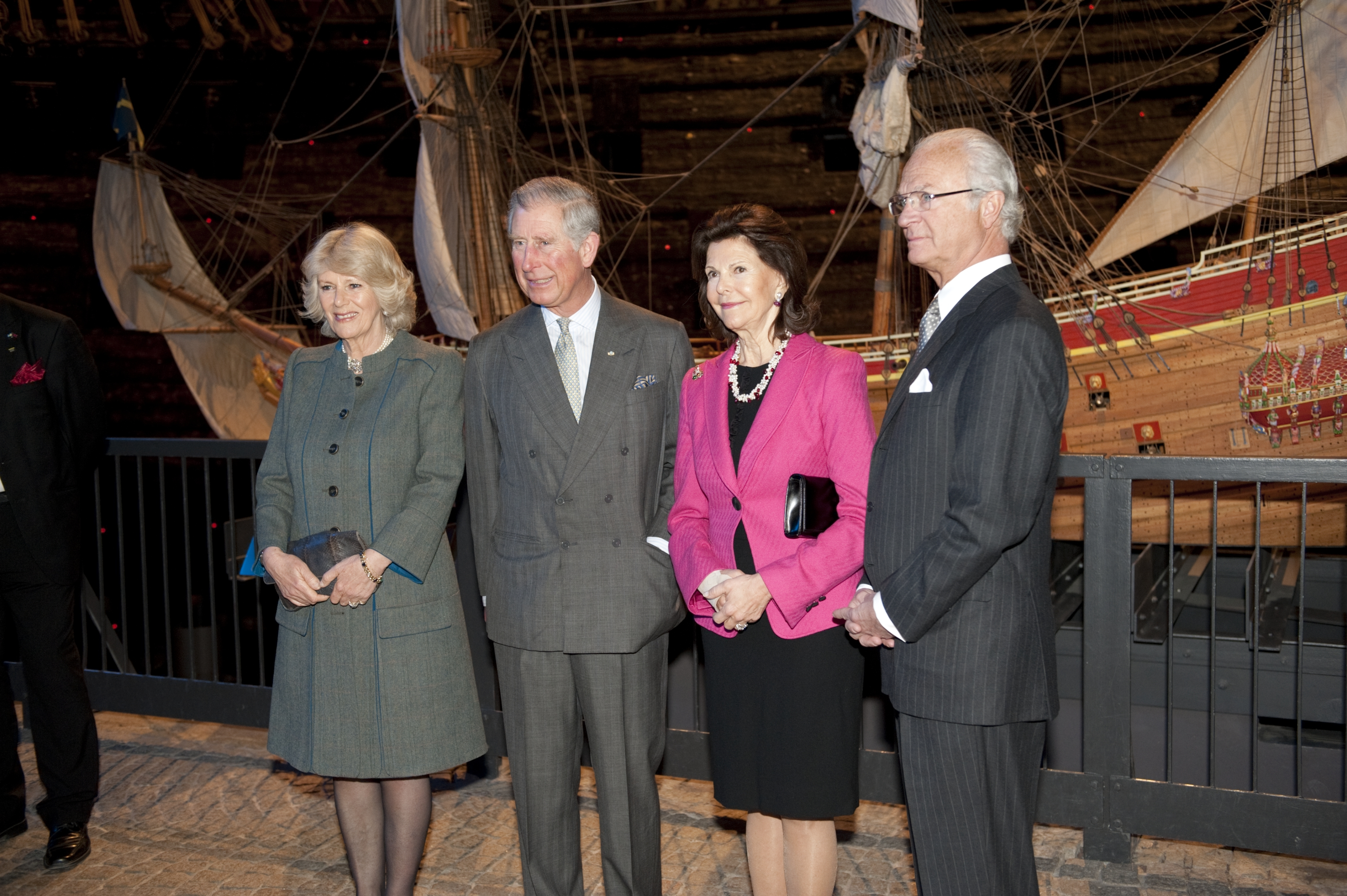
The King and Queen of Sweden with King Charles III and Queen Camilla of the United Kingdom (then Duke and Duchess of Cornwall) at the Vasa Museum in 2012.

King Carl XVI Gustaf is about 290th in line to the British throne as he is a descendant of Victoria of the United Kingdom through her third son, Prince Arthur. King Charles III, a descendant of Charles XI of Sweden is not in line to the Swedish throne, as the Swedish Act of Succession limits successors to the descendants of Carl XVI Gustaf.

Other noted British members of the Swedish royal family are Christopher O'Neill who holds a British passport, who is married to the king's daughter Princess Madeleine. Their three children; Princess Leonore, Prince Nicolas and Princess Adrienne are entitled to British nationality on descent of their father. Notable previous British members of the Swedish royal family include Welsh-born Princess Lilian, who was the king's aunt-in-law, and his paternal grandmother Princess Margaret of Connaught, the first wife of the king's grandfather Gustaf VI Adolf. King Gustaf VI Adolf continued with the British connection, by marrying the German-born Briton, Louise Mountbatten (a maternal aunt of Elizabeth II's husband, Prince Philip, Duke of Edinburgh) as his second wife. Carl XVI Gustaf's maternal grandfather, Charles Edward of Saxe-Coburg-Gotha, was by birth a British prince.

The Earl and Countess of Wessex have represented the British royal family in all the recent royal weddings the king's children of Crown Princess Victoria and Daniel Westling, Princess Madeleine and Christopher O'Neill and Prince Carl Philip and Sofia Hellqvist.

The UK and Sweden have small republican movements, including Republic and Republikanska Föreningen. Which are members of the pan-European Alliance of European Republican Movements, which is based in Stockholm.

== Transport ==
=== Air transport ===
The UK and Sweden are part of the Single European Sky, hence there are no restrictions between them to operate flights to. Both flag carriers British Airways and SAS between them fly between the capitals’ major airports of London-Heathrow to Stockholm-Arlanda, SAS also flies from Arlanda to Birmingham, Manchester and Edinburgh. BA and SAS also flies between Heathrow and Gothenburg airports, with SAS providing connections to other parts of the country.

Other carriers that fly between the UK and Sweden include regional and low-cost carriers. The regional carriers that fly between UK and Sweden are Sun-Air which flies from Gothenburg to Manchester.

Low-cost carriers are well established between the UK and Sweden, Norwegian flies from London-Gatwick, Edinburgh, Manchester airports to Arlanda and Gatwick to Gothenburg, with connections to other airports in Sweden. easyJet also flies from Gatwick to Arlanda, plus seasonally to Åre Östersund for skiing and winter holidays. Ryanair flies between London-Stansted to Stockholm-Skavsta, Stockholm-Västerås & Gothenburg, with Gothenburg-City, Malmö and Skellefteå airports in the past. Polish airline Enter Air offers seasonal charter flights to Kiruna from eleven British airports.

BA, SAS, Norwegian, easyJet and Ryanair all fly to nearby Copenhagen airport in Denmark from various British airports, which has easy access by the Öresundståg and SJ trains to Scania and Småland.

=== Marine transport ===
In the past, there were regular ro-ro ferries between Gothenburg and Newcastle, Harwich, Immingham and Hull done by Tor Lines, England-Sweden Line and Scandinavian Seaways using such ferries as the MS Tor Britannia and MS Tor Scandinavia. The plot of the BBC soap Triangle involved on a ferry between the Harwich and Gothenburg route. Popularity of travelling by ferry over the North Sea fell with advent of low-cost carriers and speedy catamaran services between Harwich and Hook of Holland and cross-channel services. Currently commercial port services for freight exist between Harwich and Immingham to Gothenburg.

== Culture and media ==
The UK and Sweden are considered cultural superpowers as they have given a large amount of cultural influence in the world despite their small size. Cross-culturally they strongly influence each other due to being Northern European countries with a majority of people being non-practicing Protestants, with a notable immigrant population. Sweden is also influenced due to the country's strong knowledge of English as a second language.

=== Literature ===
Major historical and contemporary British authors' literature are popular in Sweden, such as William Shakespeare, Lewis Carroll, the Brontë sisters, Jane Austen, Beatrix Potter, Charles Dickens, J. R. R. Tolkien & J. K. Rowling. Due to the high literary knowledge of English language, many popular works are available and read in their original text as well as translated versions. Around ten British authors including Rudyard Kipling, T. S. Eliot, Harold Pinter and the current winner Kazuo Ishiguro have all won the respected Nobel Prize in Literature which is awarded by the Swedish Academy. One British-Irish laureate George Bernard Shaw, used his prize money to help set-up and run the Anglo-Swedish Literary Foundation, a foundation which helps literate links between the UK and Sweden.

On the other hand, historical Swedish literature is quite small in the UK. The reason is that the UK is much more historically linked to literature in Central and Southern Europe such as France and Italy and knowledge of Swedish language is not widely known. However, in the last thirty years. there has been a big interest in Swedish crime thrillers which put the under category of Scandinavian noir, like Henning Mankell's Kurt Wallander series, Camilla Läckberg and the famous Stieg Larsson and his Millennium series. Sweden encourages English translations of its literature through an organisation The Swedish-English Literary Translators’ Association which provide grants to assist this.

=== Press ===
The UK and Sweden are notorious literary readers with high readership of newspapers and magazines. The strength of British news and corporate affairs in Sweden, means that many major publications have a British correspondent including Dagens Nyheter, Göteborgs-Posten & the news agency TT. On the other hand, there aren't any British resident correspondents in Sweden and the nearest is the Financial Times' Nordic correspondent who is based in Norway. British media is more highly reliant on special roving correspondents and the TT news agency to give them the news.

Due to small size of the local market and the high level of literacy of English, many British magazines in a wide range of subjects are available in Swedish newsstands like Pressbyrån. On the other hand, it is very difficult to purchase Swedish publications in the UK due to near zero knowledge of the Swedish language. The only regular publication of a Swedish language magazine is the Swedish Church's quarterly magazine Kyrkobladet .

One highly notable exception to the Swedish press corp, is the English-language Swedish online tabloid The Local. This news-site which was started as a weekly e-mail in 2004 by two British expats Paul Rapacioli & James Savage. It has now morphed into the recognised news-site and it is often quoted abroad.

=== Radio and television ===
Although it is not immediately apparent, Swedish broadcasting is heavily influenced by the UK. The public broadcaster Sveriges Radio (SR) started in 1932, copying the British model of the time of a commercial-free national public broadcaster the British Broadcasting Corporation, which was founded in 1926 and funded by an annual user licence. Although specifics have changed greatly over time, the basic set-up remains the same of a commercial-free national public broadcaster of SR, Sveriges Television (SVT) and Sveriges Utbildningsradio (UR) paid for by a per household television licence fee. The UK and Sweden have worked together in the ETSI, the EBU and the European Union in developing the standards of broadcasting, including the DAB, DVB and IPTV.

The UK was also influential in satellite broadcasting, which helped to establish commercial television in Sweden. The first commercial broadcasting channels such as the Super Channel, the Children's Channel and Sky Television were free-to-air and unencrypted in both countries and established alternatives to the national broadcaster, SVT. When British Satellite Broadcasting and Sky Television merged to form BSkyB, BSB's old satellite family Marcopolo were sold off to Nordic Satellite AB, which turned leased space from the renamed Thor 1 satellite to help create TV3, Sweden's first commercial broadcaster. Due to legal restrictions in advertising, TV3 was initially "broadcast" from its London headquarters, and even today all of the channels of TV3's parent company Viasat are broadcast from the UK despite a considerable relaxation since then of the rules on commercial broadcasting. This leads to an unusual situation where advertising on the service is regulated by the Advertising Standards Authority of the UK and not the domestic regulator, Reklamombudsmannen. TV3's broadcasting from London is also noted, as it helped start the career of British-based Swede Ulrika Jonsson as one of her first jobs in television was a weather forecaster for the channel.

The UK and Sweden are active in the field of international broadcasting. In radio, the English language service of the BBC World Service is available in Sweden by satellite on the Hotbird 13B. The BBC's own Swedish-language service was shut down in March 1961. The weekday English-language programming of Radio Sweden is made by SR International on Eutelsat 9A, and was formerly syndicated on WRN, which is available on Sky and WRN's website. The programme itself is run by a mixture of Swedes and Britons including Richard Orange and Loukas Christodoulou. All the services are available to be streamed on the respective websites of the BBC and SR, and available on podcast libraries such as iTunes.

For television, the BBC World News is available in Sweden on many platforms including BoxerTV, Viasat and Com Hem. Other BBC channels including BBC Earth, BBC Lifestyle and the BBC Knowledge channels which include a mixture of programmes from the BBC's archive are available on various Swedish satellite, cable and IPTV services. Until 2017 Swedes living in the UK had access to SVT's international channel SVT World on Eutelsat 9 and IPTV; this has been replaced by a limited selection of programmes on the on-demand service on SVT Play. On the other hand, people in Sweden cannot access the BBC's on-demand service iplayer as it is completely geo-blocked.

Many British television formats, especially reality television, have been broadcast in Sweden, including Pop Idol (Idol), The X Factor (X Factor), I'm a Celebrity...Get Me Out of Here! (Kändisdjungeln), MasterChef (Sveriges mästerkock), The Great British Bake Off (Hela Sverige bakar) and The Supersizers... (Historieätarna). Sweden also unusually copies a radio format in the popular comedy radio show Just a Minute (På minuten). The only time a Swedish format was brought over to the UK was Expedition Robinson (Survivor UK), although there have been suggestions of Melodifestivalen being brought over to improve British chances to win the Eurovision Song Contest.

Various British TV shows are shown on Swedish public and commercial television including drama such as Downton Abbey and Happy Valley, comedy such as Keeping Up Appearances (Skenet bedrar), soap operas such as Emmerdale (Hem till gården) and documentaries such as The Blue Planet. Programmes are generally subtitled rather than dubbed, except for those aimed at children. Much of this is because the cost of making programming is high in Sweden, and it is often convenient to import programming from abroad.

The phenomenon of Nordic Noir has led to a number of Swedish dramas to being broadcast on British television, including Bron (The Bridge) and Wallander; in the latter case a British version of the programme, was produced, with a British cast filmed in Sweden. The Swedish Christmas classic Sagan om Karl-Bertil Jonssons julafton (Christopher's Christmas Mission) was broadcast on Channel 4 in 1987, with Bernard Cribbins as the narrator and English dubbing. Conversely the British farce Dinner for One (Grevinnan och betjänten), little known in the UK, has been broadcast on SVT for over thirty years.

== Religion ==
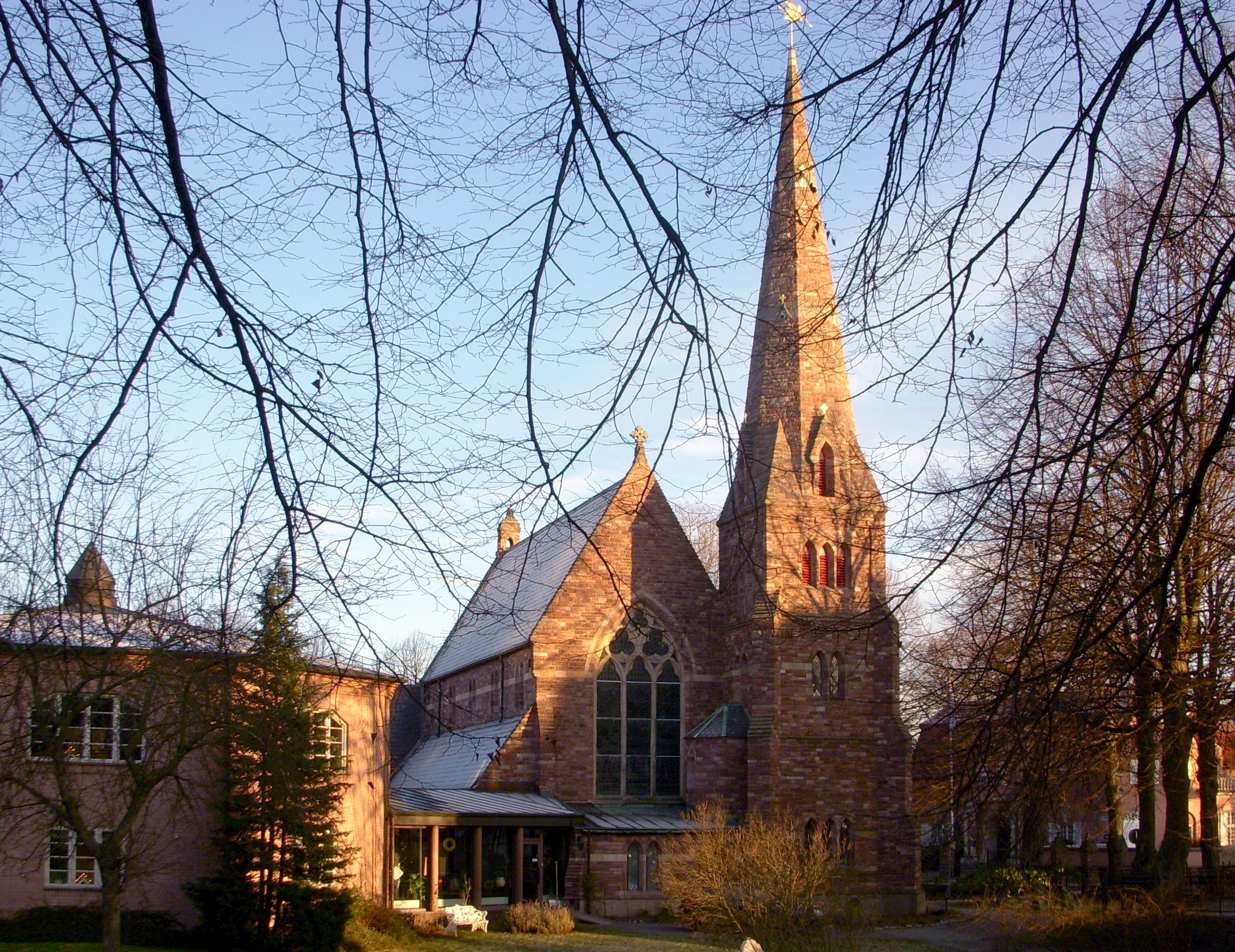
The Church of St Peter and St Sigfrid in Stockholm

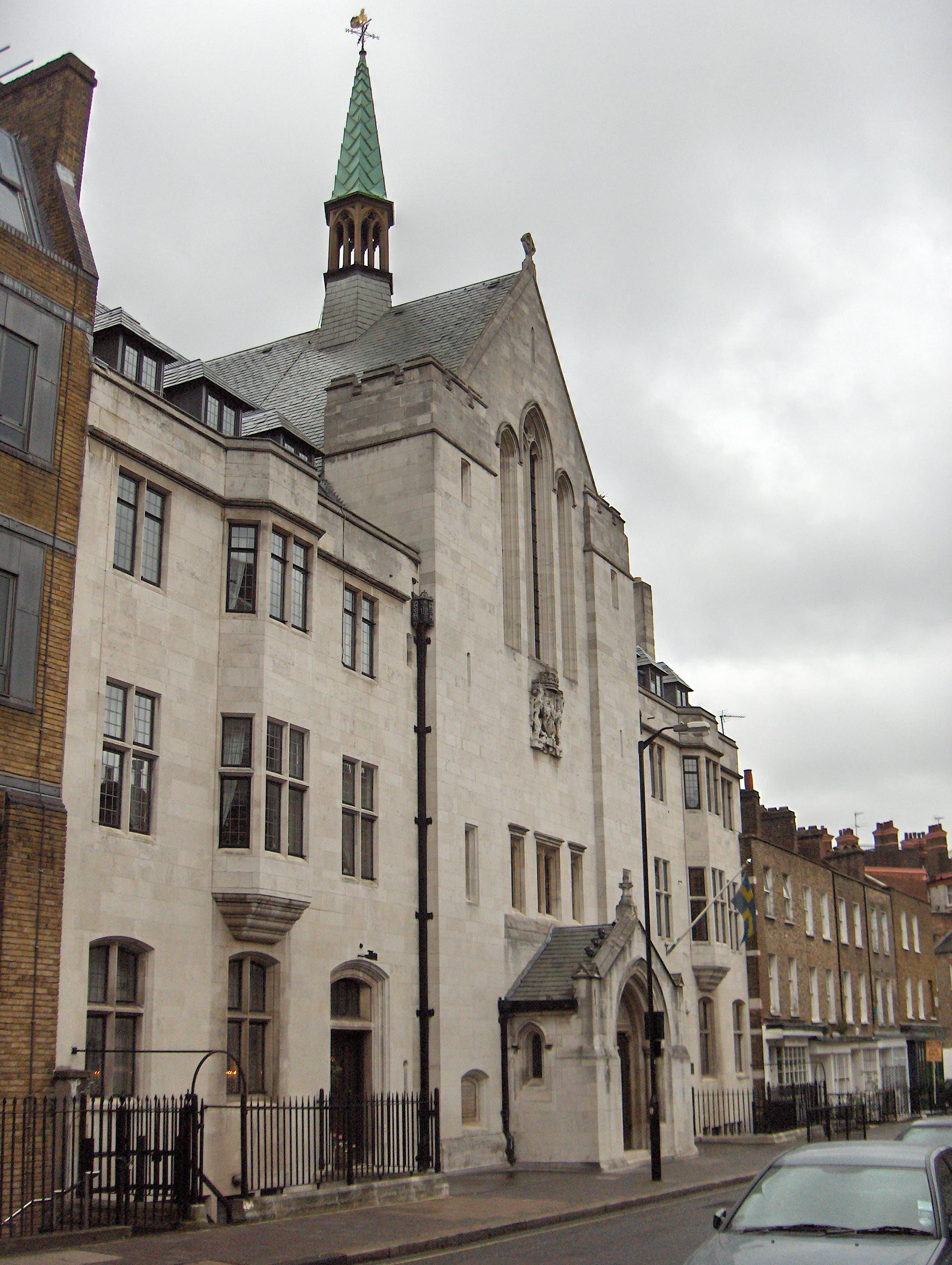
The Ulrike Eleanora Church in London

The UK and Sweden have large establishment Protestant churches, with the Lutheran Church of Sweden, Anglican Church of England and Presbyterian Church of Scotland. Although they are noted for their irreligious nature, with church attendance being low with around 5% in Sweden and 20% in the UK. They have large numbers of atheists and agnostics at 43% in Sweden and 26% in the UK. In 2011, the Northern European Lutheran and Anglican churches created a mutual agreement of the Porvoo Communion, which links the two groups of churches together which includes the Church of Sweden, the Church of England, the Church of Ireland, the Church in Wales & the Episcopalian Church of Scotland.

London is home of the Ulrike Eleanora Church, which is the city's Swedish Church on Harcourt Street, Marylebone. It comes under the Diocese of Visby, which deals with the Church of Sweden Abroad. It is part of the group of the Nordic churches in the UK, which is informal group including the Danish, Norwegian and Finnish churches in London. Every year on the Friday evening closeness to 13 December, the church organises a St Lucia concert either in St Paul's Cathedral or Westminster Cathedral which a major part of the Swedish community's calendar. They also organise an annual Christmas market on the weekend before advent, selling Swedish Christmas-ware.

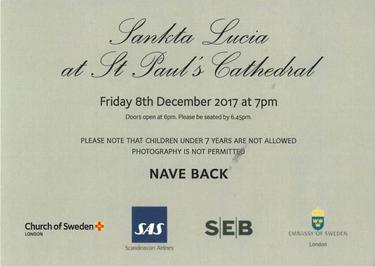
A copy of the ticket for the Church of Sweden London's Sankta Lucia concert at St Paul's.

Stockholm is home to an Anglican church, St Peter and St Sigfrid's Church, known locally as the "English Church" ("Engelska kyrkan"). It was built in the 1860s and was moved to its present location on Dag Hammarskjöldsväg in Östermalm in 1913. Gothenburg also has an Anglican church, St Andrew's, which is located in the city centre. Both churches are within the Archdiocese of Germany and Northern Europe and are administered by the Diocese of Gibraltar in Europe.

== See also ==
- Foreign relations of Sweden
- Foreign relations of the United Kingdom
- United Kingdom-EU relations
- NATO-EU relations
- England runestones
- Beowulf
- Norse activity in the British Isles
- Swedes in the United Kingdom
