= List of fitness wear brands =

This is a list of fitness wear clothing brands with articles on Wikipedia.

- Alanic
- Allbirds
- 2XU
- 361 Degrees
- 4F (company)
- Acerbis
- A.F.C.A
- Adidas
- Admiral
- Air Jordan
- Airness
- Alanic
- Alo Yoga
- AND1
- ANTA
- Ashworth
- ASICS
- Athleta
- Athletic DNA
- Atletica
- Audimas
- Avia
- BIKE Athletic Company
- BLK
- Beyond Yoga
- Brine
- British Cricket Balls
- British Knights
- Brooks
- Bukta
- Burley-Sekem
- Callaway
- Canterbury
- Capelli Sport
- Carbrini
- Castore (brand)
- CCM
- Champion
- Champs
- Classic Sportswear
- Columbia
- Converse
- Craft of Scandinavia
- Craghoppers
- De Marchi
- Deuter Sport
- Diadora
- Donnay
- Dryworld
- Duarig
- Dunlop
- Dynamic
- Ellesse
- Ell & Voo
- ERKE
- Erreà
- Everlast
- Fabletics
- Fairtex Gym
- FBT
- Fila
- Finta
- Forward
- FSS
- Gymshark
- Galvin Green
- Geox
- Gilbert
- Givova
- Gola
- Grand
- Gul
- Gunn & Moore
- Head
- Hi-Tec
- Hummel
- Hunkemöller HKMX
- ISC
- Ivivva athletica
- Jako
- Joma
- K-Swiss
- K2 Sports
- Kappa
- Karhu
- Kelme
- Keuka
- Kickers
- Kukri
- Lacoste
- Le Coq Sportif
- Le Tigre
- Let's Bands
- League
- Legea
- Li-Ning
- Live Breathe Futbol
- Lonsdale
- Looptworks
- Lorna Jane
- Lotto
- Loudmouth Golf
- Luanvi
- Lululemon Athletica
- LUTA
- Macron
- Myprotein
- Majestic Athletic
- Marathon
- Maverik Lacrosse
- Merooj
- Meyba
- Mikasa
- Mitchell & Ness
- Mitre
- Mizuno
- Molten
- Moncler
- Mondetta
- Munich
- Musto
- Nanque
- New Balance
- New Era
- Nike
- Nivia
- No Fear
- Nomis
- Olympikus
- On Holding AG
- Onda
- One Way
- O'Neill
- O'Neills
- Outdoor Voices
- Patrick
- Peak
- Penalty
- Ping
- Pirma
- Pony
- Prince
- Prospecs
- Puma
- Quechua
- Quick
- Rapha
- Raymond Ltd
- Reebok
- Regatta (clothing)
- Reusch
- Riddell
- Russell Athletic
- Ryderwear
- Rykä
- Romai Sports
- Saeta
- Salomon
- Santini SMS
- Select
- Sergio Tacchini
- Sherrin
- Shimano
- Signia
- Skins
- Skis Rossignol
- Slazenger
- Soffe
- Sondico
- Spalding
- SPECS
- Speedo
- Sportika
- Starbury
- Starter
- Steeden
- Sting
- Sugino
- Superga
- Swix
- TaylorMade-Adidas
- The Game
- Titleist
- Tokaido
- Topper
- TYKA
- Tyr
- Uhlsport
- Umbro
- Under Armour
- Vuori
- Walon Sport
- Warrior
- Warriors
- Warrix Sports
- Webb Ellis
- Wilson
- XBlades
- Xero Shoes
- Xtep
- Yonex
- Zoke
