= Rhone (brand) =

American activewear company

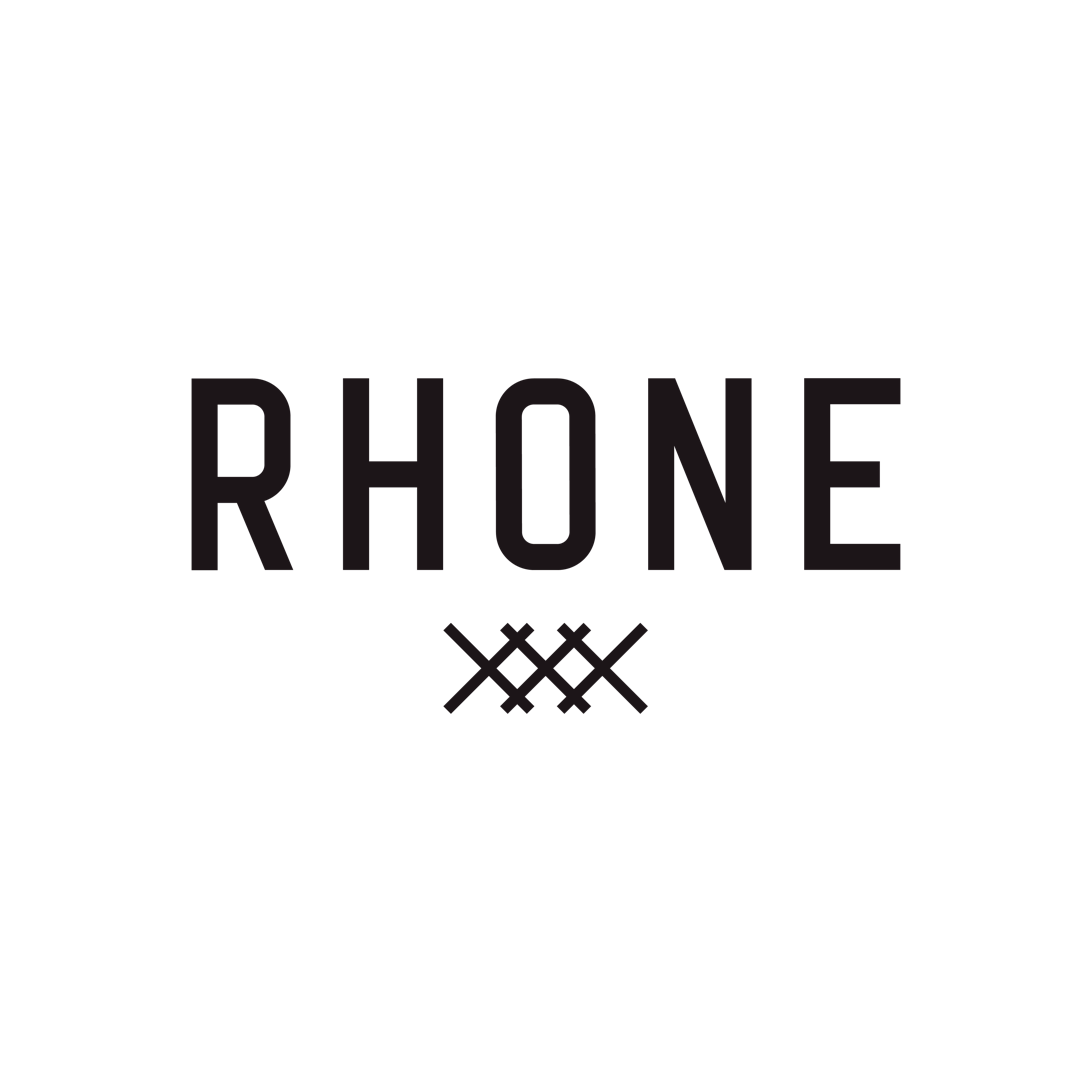
- Founded: 2014; 12 years ago
- Founders: Nate Checketts, Carras Holmstead, Casey Edgar, Kyle McClure, Ben Checketts
- Headquarters: One Dock Street, Stamford, United States
- Number of locations: 21
- Website: rhone.com

Rhone is an athleisure and activewear apparel brand founded in 2014 by brothers Nate and Ben Checketts. It is named after the Rhône river and region in France known for its historical significance and aesthetic beauty.

== History ==
Rhone was founded by brothers Nate and Ben Checketts, along with Casey Edgar, Kyle McClure and Carras Holmstead. Initially launched as a web-only retailer, Rhone later partnered with Bloomingdale's in November 2014, expanding its sales to five locations. In 2015, the company's products were stocked in a total of 127 locations, including retailers such as Nordstrom, Equinox, and CorePower Yoga. In November 2015, Rhone generated 62% of its total annual revenue for 2014.

In September 2015, Rhone announced the closing of a $5 million Series A financing round, with investments from individuals in sports, media, and fashion industries. Since its inception, Rhone has raised a total of $6.2 million in funding. In February 2016, the company acquired a building in Stamford, Connecticut to serve as its new headquarters.

In 2026 the company launched its ReRhone e-commerce site to sell customer returns that have been vetted by the company.

== Profile and products ==
Rhone primarily manufactures and sells activewear. The company uses fabrics like organic cotton, recycled polyester, merino wool, and modal in their products. Many of the company's offerings include antimicrobial and breathable fabrics. Flatlock stitching, where the seams lie flat with edges of fabric butting together rather than folding together, is used to avoid chafing.

Originally focused on men's activewear, Rhone began selling a permanent line of women's activewear in April 2024, after having offered temporary women's collections in the past.

== See also ==
- Alo Yoga
- Beyond Yoga
- Fabletics
- Lululemon
- On
- Vuori
- Athleta
