= Onda =

Onda or Ondas may refer to:

== Places ==
- Onda, Arkansas, an unincorporated community in Washington County
- Onda, Castellón, a municipality of province of Castellón, Valencian Community, Spain
- Onda, Bankura, a village in Bankura district, West Bengal, India
- Onda (community development block), an administrative division in Bankura district in the Indian state of West Bengal
- Onda (Vidhan Sabha constituency), an electoral constituency in Bankura district
- Onda Station, Yokohama, Japan

== Organizations ==
- CD Onda, a football club based in Onda, Castellón, Spain
- Onda Mobile Communication, an Italian telecommunications company
- ONDA Technologies, Inc. (昂达电子), a major Chinese motherboard manufacturer
- ONDA (Morocco), now known as Airports of Morocco, a Moroccan airports operator
- Onda (sportswear), a Portuguese sportswear brand

== Music ==
- Ondas (award), Spanish music awards
- Ondas (album), a 1981 album by New Zealand jazz pianist Mike Nock
- Ondas, a 2000 album by German band Estampie
- Onda (Jambinai album), a 2019 album by South Korean band Jambinai
- Onda, singer and member of South Korean girl group Everglow

== Other uses ==
- Onda (surname), a Japanese surname
- La Onda, a Mexican artistic movement
