= Alanic =

Alanic may refer to:

- Alanic language, the language of the Alans
- Alanic (brand), American sports and fitness clothing brand
- Mathilde Alanic, French writer
