= Mrs. Space Cadet =

American runner and social media personality

Erin Azar
Personal information
- Nickname: Mrs. Space Cadet
- Nationality: American
- Born: October 11, 1983 (age 42) Kempton, Pennsylvania
- Website: https://www.mrsspacecadet.com/

Sport
- Sport: Running

TikTok information
- Page: Mrs. Space Cadet
- Followers: 855.8K
- Socials last updated: Apr 24, 2023

Erin Azar (born October 11, 1983 (age 42)), also known as Mrs. Space Cadet, is an American runner and social media personality.

== Early life ==
Azar is from Kempton, Pennsylvania.

== Social media career ==
Azar started running a few months after giving birth to her third child. Her first goal was to run for 30 days. Her goal later increased to running a marathon within a year. She started documenting her runs online soon after starting running; she started on YouTube and later moved to TikTok in order to find a community for her to fit into. She made videos because she couldn't find any 'realistic running' videos online. On her social media, she invited her followers to join her, a "slightly overweight person who drinks too much beer" and "an expert struggle runner", as she trained for a marathon. She quickly became popular, and her first video has over 1 million views as of November 2021. She has 696,300 followers and 26 million likes on TikTok as of November 2021.

Through her popularity, she has managed to raise more than US$76,000 to the Michael J. Fox Foundation as of November 2021. She hoped to eventually raise US$100,000.

=== Running career ===
Azar ran the 2021 New York City Marathon. She completed the course in 6 hours and 8 minutes. She decided to run in a marathon after seeing the 2021 New Jersey Marathon cancelled in August 2021. In 2022 she ran the Chicago Marathon.

== Personal life ==
She lives in Kutztown, Pennsylvania. She is married and has three children. Her oldest child was born in 2013 or 2014 (age 10–11).

Her father, Jim Gaffney, has Parkinson's disease. She left her marketing job in order to pursue running full-time.
