= Focus mitt =

Padded target fixed to a glove, used in training combat athletes

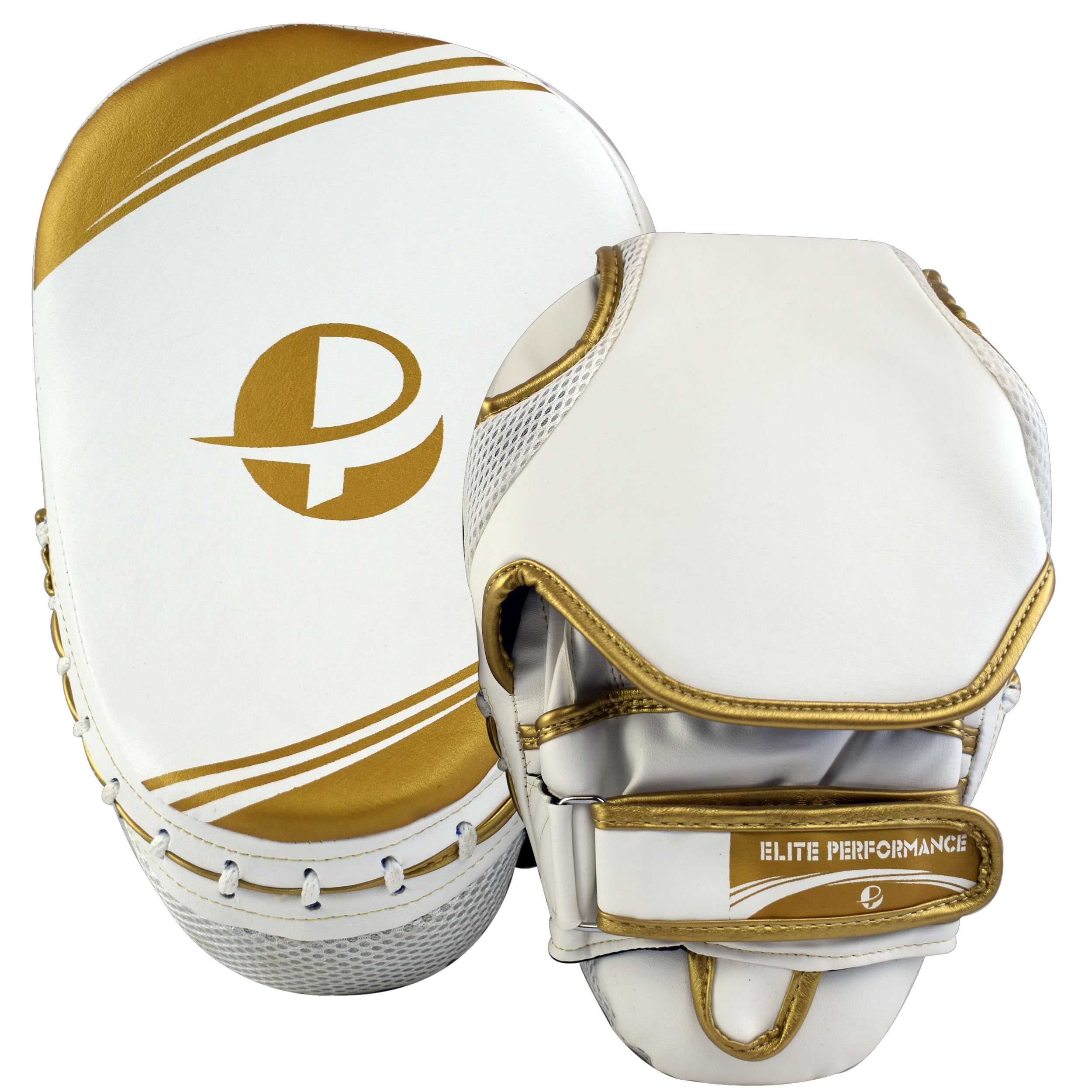
Focus mitts front and reverse sides.

A focus mitt is a padded target attached to a glove and usually used in training boxers and other combat athletes.

The use of focus mitts is said to have come about as Muay Thai and Far Eastern martial arts made their way toward the United States in the late 1700s. The concept first began with using foot tongs or slippers on hands to absorb the impact from kicks and strikes. Modern day punch mitts came into more widespread use in the mid-1960s when Bruce Lee was seen using them in his training routines. Although they have been around for decades, they were never a central part of coaching until the late ‘70s and early ‘80s. Now they’ve become an almost irreplaceable part of a fighter’s routine.

The person holding the focus mitts will typically call out combinations and "feed" the puncher good counter-force while maneuvering and working specific skills. Focus mitts are often used as an augment to sparring, with more explicit focus on the puncher than the feeder, especially to develop good punch combinations and defensive maneuvers such as "slipping," "bobbing" and "weaving."

When wearing focus mitts it is important not merely to hold them but to actively "feed" them into the punches, to balance their force and prevent injury to both parties.

Similar to a focus mitt but designed for different purposes are heavier Thai pads used in muay Thai boxing and MMA, kicking shields, body shields and uppercut shields used in a variety of martial arts to help gauge distance and practice techniques with kicks, knees, elbows and uppercuts.

== Working with focus mitts ==
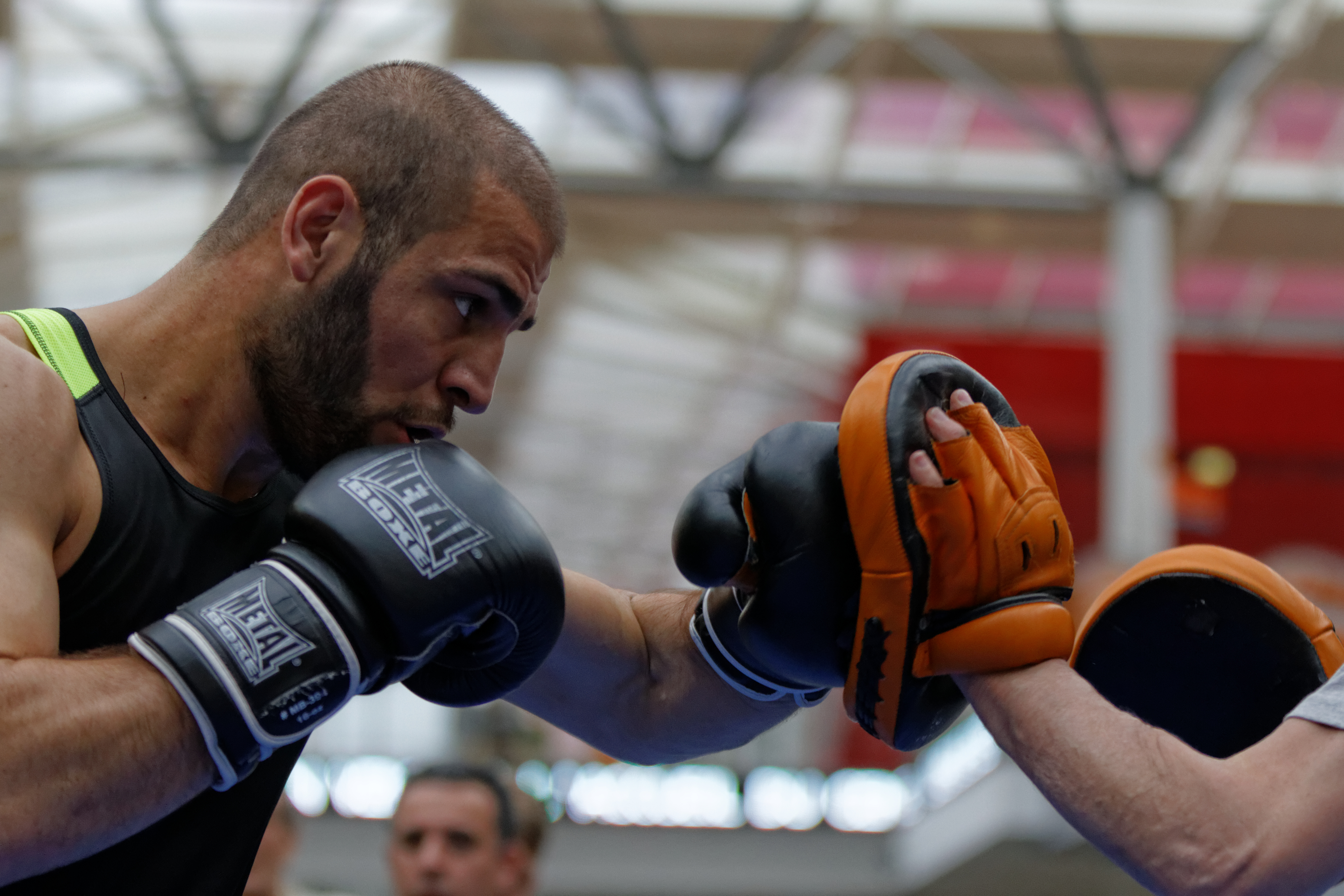
Boxer Engin Karakaplan strikes focus mitts to demonstrate technique during a public training session

It is often said that holding focus mitts can be as taxing as striking them. Typically, the person wearing the focus mitts will yell a number that represents a combination. For example, yelling "one, two, three!" might signify that the striker should throw a jab, followed by a cross, followed by a hook in rapid succession. Defensive maneuvers are often incorporated into the combinations as well.

Improving punching technique relies upon the person wearing the focus mitts knowing where to set his/her hands, as well as knowing how to time the movement of the focus mitts. Typically the holder will comment on how the striker can improve his/her technique between combinations.

== See also ==
- Sting Sports
