= XBlades =

Australian sportswear company

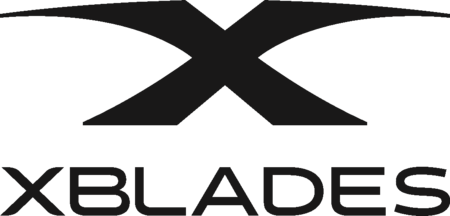
- Company type: Private company
- Industry: Textile, footwear
- Founded: 1989; 37 years ago
- Founder: David Miers
- Headquarters: Melbourne, Australia
- Area served: Australia
- Products: Teamwear, protective gear, football boots, clothing
- Website: xblades.com.au

XBlades is an Australian sports equipment manufacturing company that designs, develops, and sells products primarily related to footwear and clothing. The company was established in 1989 to make shoes for athletes who played rugby union and Australian rules football.

The company is the original creator of the bladed sole football boot, designed to minimize athlete injury.

== History ==
XBlades was established by David Miers, a biomechanist listed with AFL club Collingwood in the 1980s. He suffered many knee injuries throughout his career, which he attributed to his studded boots, leading him to create a rubber-soled shoe with X-shaped 'blades' as an alternative.

Gloucester Rugby signed the company as its new kit supplier in April 2015 for their 2015–2016 season. In January 2016, XBlades was acquired by former Callaway Golf director Leighton Richards and former AFL player Jimmy Bartel.

XBlades and Major League Rugby (MLR) announced a multi-year partnership in December 2017.

The company signed a four-year deal with the London Irish starting in the 2017–2018 season.

== See also ==
- List of fitness wear brands
