= Alanic (brand) =

American sports and fitness clothing brand

- Type: Private
- Industry: Clothing, Sportswear and Sports Equipment
- Founded: 2005; 21 years ago
- Headquarters: Beverly Hills, Los Angeles, California, United States
- Area served: Worldwide
- Products: sports wear
- Brands: Alanic
- Parent: Dioz Group
- Website: www.alanic.clothing

Alanic is a sports and fitness clothing brand headquartered in North Hollywood, California, US. Alanic corporate offices are located at 1/49 Lemana lane, Sydney, Australia. It has been the official supplier of the Miami Marathon US, Vancouver Sun Run Canada, New Jersey Marathon US and Some Major Tier 1 Marathons in the United States and also the National Basketball Team of Australia. Alanic has been associated with events like ATP – St. Petersburg Open Tennis; Indianapolis Monumental Marathon 2013, Indiana; 2012 Ironman Triathlon Series in Australia, NZ & Philippines; Seattle Marathon, US; Malibu Marathon, US; where it acted as the official supplier and clothing partner. The Tough Mudder announced a new multi-year partnership with Alanic as the official apparel partner.

== See also ==
- List of fitness wear brands
