= One Way Sport =

Sportswear brand and defunct Finnish company

- Industry: Sports equipment
- Founded: 2004 in Vantaa, Finland, and part of Fischer Sports GmbH since 2018
- Headquarters: Ried im Innkreis, Austria
- Products: Cross-country and alpine ski poles, trekking poles, Nordic walking poles, ski roller poles, protection gear, softgoods, bags, accessories
- Owner: Fischer Sports GmbH
- Website: www.onewaysport.com

One Way Sport (brand name: ONE WAY) is a sports equipment brand with Finnish roots. Headquartered in Ried im Innkreis, Austria, and operating as part of Fischer Sports, the brand develops and produces poles for both winter and summer outdoor sports and related products like apparel, gloves, bags, and protective gear.

== History ==
One Way Sport Oy
- Type: Osakeyhtiö
- Industry: Sports equipment, sportswear, ski poles
- Founded: 2004 in Vantaa, Finland
- Founder: Andreas Bennert
- Defunct: 2018
- Fate: Bankrupted; trademark and patent rights acquired by Fischer Sports
- Headquarters: Vantaa, Finland
- Area served: Europe, North America, Australia, Asia

The company One Way Sport Oy was established in 2004 by Andreas Bennert in Vantaa, Finland, to produce ski poles. It went bankrupt in 2018, and the trademark and patent rights were bought by Fischer Sports. As of 2026, the One Way Sport website advertised products such as ski poles, trekking poles, nordic walking poles, accessories, and protection gear. It remained a part of Fischer Sports GmbH.

== Products ==
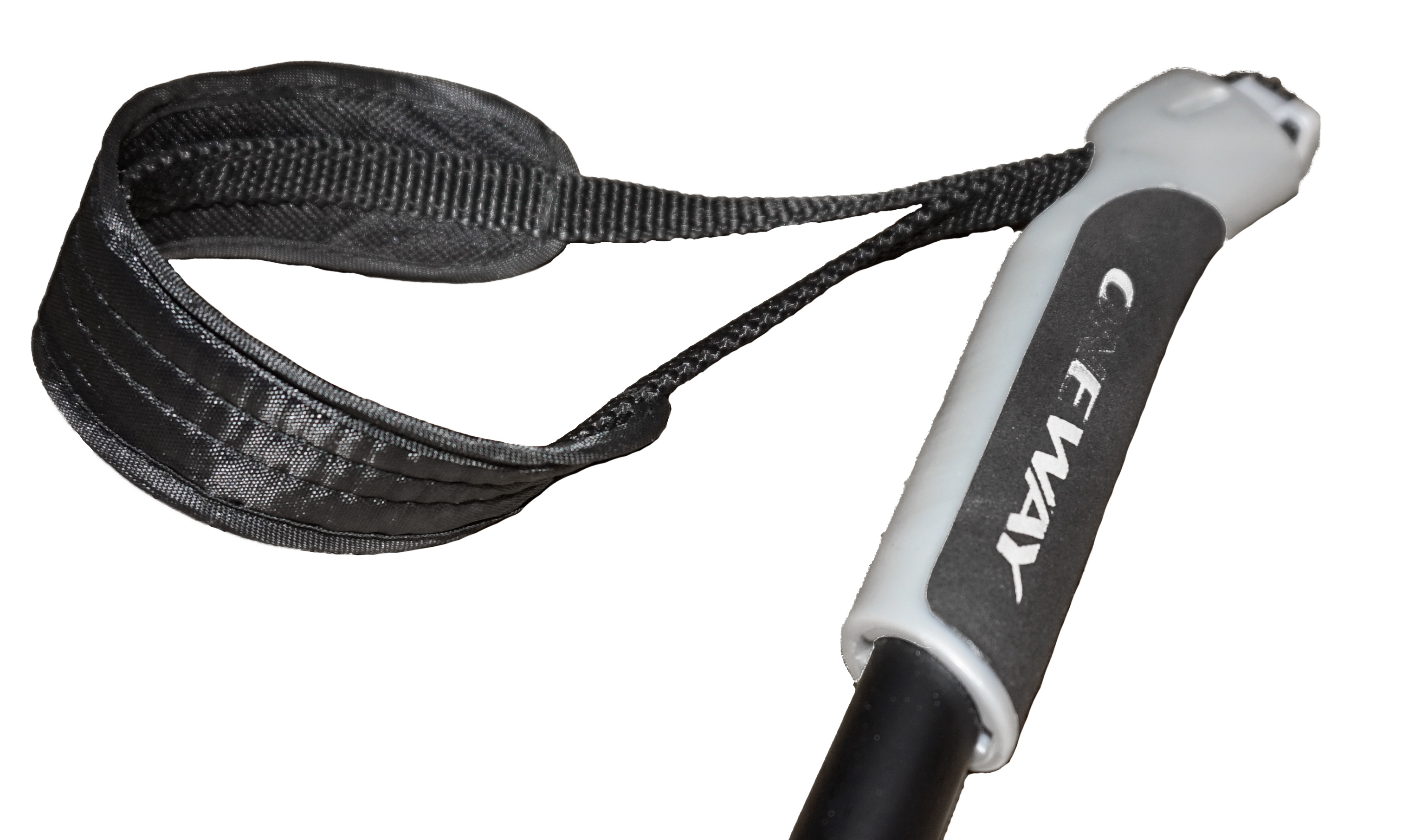
A ski pole grip with One Way branding

The range of products includes:

- Cross-country ski poles
- Alpine ski poles
- Trekking poles
- Skiroller poles
- Nordic walking poles
- Related products such as protective sports gear, softgoods including gloves and apparel, outdoor bags and accessories.

== Athletic sponsorships ==
One Way Sports supports a range of athletes across different disciplines, such as:

Nordic (Biathlon, XC-Skiing, Combined)

- Sturla Holm Lægreid (Biathlon)
- Lars Heggen (XC-Skiing)
- Astrid Øyre Slind (XC-Skiiing)
- Quentin Fillon Maillet (Biathlon)
- Océane Michelon (Biathlon)
- Johannes Dale (Biathlon)
- Lisa Vittozzi (Biathlon)
- Vetle Sjåstad Christiansen (Biathlon)
- Dorothea Wierer (Biathlon)

Alpine (Ski Alpin)

- Eduard Hallberg (Slalom)
- Linus Strasser (Slalom)
- Stefan Rogentin (Speed)
- Justin Murisier (Speed)
- Daniel Yule (Slalom)
- Ramon Zenhäusern (Slalom)
- Albert Popov (Slalom)

Freeski & Freeride

- Mathilde Gremaud (Freeski – Slopestyle/Big Air)
- Sandra Lahnsteiner
- Max Kroneck

Skimo (Ski Mountaineering)

- Marianne Fatton
- Sarah Dreier
- Christoph Hochenwarter

== See also ==
- List of fitness wear brands
- List of companies of Finland
