= Oz Pearlman =

American mentalist (born 1982)

- Born: July 19, 1982 (age 44); Israel
- Other name: Oz the Mentalist
- Citizenship: Israeli; American
- Education: electrical engineering
- Alma mater: University of Michigan
- Occupations: Magician; mentalist; athlete
- Spouse: Elisa Rosen (m. 2010)
- Children: 5
- Website: ozpearlman.com

Oz Pearlman (Hebrew: עוז פרלמן) (born July 19, 1982), also known as "Oz the Mentalist", is an Israeli-American mentalist, author, magician, and long-distance runner of marathons and ultramarathons. He is best known for minor media appearances performing mentalism (magic tricks) for sports teams, including the Dallas Cowboys, New York Jets, Green Bay Packers, and the Los Angeles Lakers.

NBC (national) aired a travel show about Pearlman titled Oz Knows. He won a New York Emmy Award for the show.

Pearlman has appeared in televised media outside of the United States, such as ESPN Philippines and a TV commercial for Mohegan Sun in China.

In 2025, Pearlman delivered a TED Talk titled The Art of Reading Minds. He discussed a mnemonic related to remembering names of people. Pearlman served as the host of the 2026 White House Correspondents' Dinner, which was aborted due to shots fired. He performed at the rescheduled dinner three months later.

== Early life ==
Pearlman was born on July 19, 1982, in northern Israel. He moved to the United States due to his father’s career as an engineer (also a Lieutenant Commander in Israeli Navy) when he was three, and then lived in Wisconsin and mainly in Michigan (Farmington). When he turned twelve, he was informed that he had had a twin brother who died at birth. Pearlman graduated from the University of Michigan in 2003. He performed magic at restaurants, children’s shows and corporate events at the age of 14, and has stated that he always had a deck of cards with him between the ages of 13 and 18.

== Career ==
Pearlman was originally employed at Merrill Lynch in its global technology-services department, only performing magic and mentalism as a part-time profession. After he was allowed to deliver a corporate entertainment show to upper management within the company, he quit his full-time job at Merrill Lynch to become a full-time entertainer.

Pearlman appeared on HBO's Hard Knocks, the NBC Golf Channel and as a guest on CBS Sports coverage of NCAA March Madness. Pearlman won third place in Season 10 of America's Got Talent in 2015. On January 13, 2020, he returned as a contestant for America's Got Talent: The Champions.

NBC TV (national) aired a travel show called Oz Knows in 2018, which followed Pearlman to various tourist attractions where he would perform his mentalism. Pearlman won an Emmy Award in May 2018 for the show. In July 2023, Pearlman was a featured performer for ESPY Awards on ESPN. He also made guest appearances on NBC Today Show on August 23, 2015 and in 2016 and predicted the Super Bowl result on January 26, 2017.

On December 17, 2024, Pearlman was a guest on The Howard Stern Show. Ten years earlier, in 2014, Stern's guest Valerie Harper, while discussing her terminal illness, had privately shared a secret code word with Stern that only the two of them would know, which could be used after her death to prove whether psychics are real. The idea for using a secret word was based on a pact that the illusionist Harry Houdini had made with his wife Bess in which they promised each other that the first one to die would attempt to contact the other from the afterlife, using a code that the couple had created to confirm the veracity of any spiritualists or psychics who might claim that they had made contact. Pearlman correctly guessed that Harper's secret word was "curly", greatly shocking Stern.

On June 4, 2025, Pearlman appeared on the Joe Rogan Experience. According to Rogan, Pearlman correctly guessed the ATM PIN code of Rogan's bank account. Rogan appeared visibly disturbed by this and stated "Yeah... that's weird," followed by "Yeah, I don't like that." The hosts of FLAGRANT hosted Pearlman on their podcast the following week.

On November 18, 2025, Pearlman appeared on The View and revealed host Sara Haines's real PIN number live on the air. Later, Haines stated that she felt "violated" by Pearlman. "I don't like someone that will sell a human violation for click bait," said Haines.

On December 5, 2025, Pearlman appeared on The Tonight Show Starring Jimmy Fallon, where he told Fallon to pick someone in the show's crowd. Fallon picked one person, changed his mind and selected another. The first crowd member found an envelope under her chair saying, "So sorry Jimmy did not go with you," and the second one found an envelope reading "Jimmy will pick me." The rest of the audience found envelopes reading "Jimmy will not pick me." Pearlman then asked the crowd and Fallon to picture a celebrity and write it down. Pearlman correctly guessed that Fallon and the entire crowd picked actor Will Smith.

On April 15, 2026, Pearlman went on Hasan Minhaj's podcast Hasan Minhaj Doesn't Know. On April 27, 2026, Pearlman appeared on The Basement Yard with Joe Santagato and Frank Alvarez, where he guessed a contact from Joe's phone and a childhood friend of both podcasters.

=== 2026 White House Correspondents' Dinner ===
On February 26, 2026, Pearlman was announced to serve as the host of the 2026 White House Correspondents' Dinner. The dinner was held on April 25, 2026, but was interrupted when gunshots were fired, which left the dinner cancelled and necessitated its rescheduling. He performed at the rescheduled dinner on July 25.

== Book ==
On October 28, 2025, Penguin Random House released a book by Pearlman called Read Your Mind.

== Criticism ==
"I don't read minds," Pearlman says, "I read people." Critics have called this statement of Pearlman's his main deception, as he often scouts audience members prior to performances and carries out investigative discovery into guests to get answers instead of expertly reading subtle body language or other cues in the moment. Pearlman's critics say that selling books on how to "read people" is fraud.

== Long-distance running achievements ==
On April 4, 2022, Pearlman broke the world record for most miles run in Central Park in New York. The total distance that he ran was more than 116 miles (19 loops), and it was completed in 17 hours, 40 minutes and 59 seconds. The New York Times, Reuters, Runner's World, and CBS News published articles about the event. The event raised money to help Ukrainian citizens affected by the war against Russia.

On August 5, 2022, Pearlman ran 130 miles in 21 hours, 52 minutes and 33 seconds from Montauk to Manhattan. The Audacious Report produced a short documentary about the run and The New York Times published an article about it.

Pearlman has won the New Jersey Marathon four times. He won the 50-mile Chicago Ultra Marathon in 2015 in 5 hours, 25 minutes, and 26 seconds, and has ranked within the top 30 fastest Americans for 50-mile races. He has also participated in the Hawaii Ironman World Championship, Western States 100 Mile Run, Spartathlon 153 Mile Run, Leadville 100 Mile Run and Badwater 135 Mile Run.

== Media appearances ==
=== Onscreen and podcast appearances ===
- America's Got Talent
- The Joe Rogan Experience
- CBS 60 Minutes
- The Ellen Show
- Hard Knocks
- Piers Morgan Uncensored
- The Early Show
- The Dr. Oz Show
- Power Lunch
- Fox & Friends
- NBC's Squawk Box
- NBC Golf Channel
- Jake Paul's podcast BS w/ Jake Paul
- Flagrant
- Today Show
- Bert Kreischer's podcast
- Elvis Duran and the Morning Show
- The Tonight Show Starring Jimmy Fallon
- Hasan Minhaj Doesn't Know
- The Basement Yard
- The Howard Stern Show

=== Sports appearances ===
Pearlman has performed mentalism for major sports teams, including:

- Dallas Cowboys
- Cincinnati Bengals
- Milwaukee Bucks
- Alabama Crimson Tide
- Michigan Wolverines
- Texas A&M Aggies
- Duke Blue Devils
- Buffalo Bills
- Tampa Bay Buccaneers
- Baltimore Ravens
- New York Giants
- Seattle Seahawks
- New York Jets
- Green Bay Packers
- Los Angeles Lakers
- Las Vegas Raiders
- Detroit Lions

=== Print and website publications ===
- Forbes
- Sports Illustrated
- The New York Times
- USA Today
- ABC World News Tonight
- The Howard Stern Show
- People
- Esquire
- GQ
