= ISC (sportswear) =

Australian sportswear company

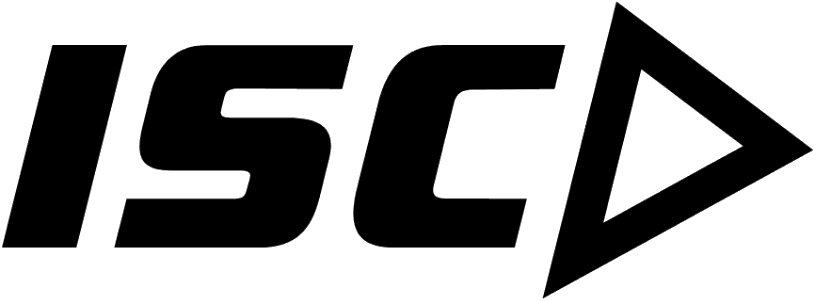
- Type: Public company
- Industry: Textile
- Founded: 1991; 35 years ago in Rosebery, New South Wales
- Headquarters: Sydney, New South Wales, Australia
- Key people: Norm Gelber (Director); Jason Schulman (Group CEO and Managing Director); Scott Manley (COO)
- Products: Sportswear, accessories
- Website: iscsport.com

ISC (International Sports Clothing) is an Australian clothing manufacturer. The company was founded in the Sydney suburb of Rosebery in 1991. ISC mainly manufactures team uniforms for several sports, including Australian football, rugby league, rugby union, association football, cricket, basketball, netball as well as schoolwear. ISC also produces licensed casual wear clothing such as polo shirts, hoodies, jackets, and caps.

== History ==
In the past, ISC has sponsored the Australian national cricket team from 1991 to 2002, the 1992 Cricket World Cup, the Milton Keynes Dons from 2010 to 2012, the NBL from 2014 to 2016, and the English national rugby league team from 2010 to 2015.

ISC had an exclusive contract with Marvel to design rugby jerseys for nine of their National Rugby League teams to wear that displays some of Marvel's superheroes. There have been three series of "ISC Marvel Heroes" jerseys, the latest series was run in late March and early April 2017. A similar promotion was brought to the Super League in May 2017.

In December 2024, Under Armour made a strategic investment in ISC Sport, becoming a shareholder and forming a partnership to roll ISC’s product lines into Under Armour Teamwear.

== Current major partnerships ==
=== Australian Rules Football ===
==== Australian Football League ====
- (Australia) Hawthorn Football Club

=== Soccer ===
==== Club teams ====
- (Australia) Canberra United (female)

=== Rugby league ===
==== National Rugby League ====
- (Australia) Canberra Raiders

=== Rugby union ===
==== Super Rugby ====
- (Australia) NSW Waratahs

== See also ==
- List of fitness wear brands
- List of sporting goods manufacturers
