= 2XU =

Australian/New Zealand sports gear corporation

- Type: Private
- Industry: Textile
- Founded: January 2005; 21 years ago
- Founders: Clyde Davenport, Jamie Hunt, Aidan Clarke
- Headquarters: Melbourne, Victoria, Australia
- Area served: Worldwide
- Products: Compression garment
- Website: 2xu.com

2XU Pty. Ltd. is an Australian/New Zealand multinational corporation engaged in the design, development and selling of sportswear, mostly compression garment for sports such as triathlon, cycling, running, open water swimming, and physical fitness. Founded in 2005 by Clyde Davenport, Jamie Hunt and Aidan Clarke, the company is headquartered in Melbourne, Victoria.

2XU stands for "Two Times You," which symbolises the multiplication of human performance.

2XU has been worn by world champion athletes including triathlete Emma Snowsill and currently holds official alliances with organisations including Rowing Australia, the Australian Paralympic Committee, United States Ski and Snowboard Association, and the Australian Institute of Sport.

== History ==
In 2003, Clyde Davenport approached Jamie Hunt & Aidan Clarke about creating a sportswear brand. Davenport had recently sold his eponymous underwear line.

In March 2012, 2XU acquired Sports Multiplied which was renamed 2XU North America.

In May 2013, 2XU launched its interactive microsite, Athlete 2.0. The site provided more tools to achieve multiplying athletic performance through its gear, recovery, workouts, and nutritional portals.

In 2017, 2XU collaborated with Kanye West to design a wetsuit for his Yeezy Season 5 fashion line.

== Ownership ==
In 2011, Lazard Australia Private Equity acquired a minority interest share in the 2XU business. In December 2013, L Capital acquired 40 percent of 2XU.

The L Capital investment cost a reported A$75 million (US$68.3 million). L Capital is a private equity firm sponsored by French luxury retail company LVMH Group.

== Stores ==
Within Australia, 2XU is retailed in 20 of its own 2XU Performance Centres, and stocked in major sports stores across the country including Rebel Sport, Amart Sports, Anaconda, The Iconic, and Melbourne Sports and Aquatic Centre (MSAC). In May 2013, 2XU opened its first Performance Centre in the United States, 2XU Santa Monica, in Los Angeles, California, and the company opened a store in the Fashion Island shopping centre in Newport Beach in June 2014. Outside of Australia, 2XU has 24 distributors across 50 countries in Asia, Central and South America, Europe, and North America.

== Sport affiliations ==
2XU was the apparel supplier of the Gold Coast Football Club in 2013 and 2014.

2XU sponsors multiple sports teams and events, including the Surrey Men's League, a company-sponsored cross-country league, and the 2XU Compression Run, a half-marathon held annual in Singapore since 2011.

It also sponsors 2XU Stroke & Stride, a swimming and running biathlon located in New Zealand, as well as the 2XU Great Ocean and Otway Classic Ride, a bike ride that starts and ends in Torquay.

The company also sponsors 2XU New Zealand Davis Cup, a tennis team. 2XU is the official compression supplier to the Australian Institute of Sport, Ironman Triathlon, and for the U.S. Ski and Snowboard Association.

== 2XU Compression Run ==
2XU organises annual running event known as the 2XU Compression Run for 5km, 10km and 21.1km categories.

== See also ==
- List of fitness wear brands
