= The Game Headwear =

- Company type: Brand
- Industry: Headgear
- Founded: 1960; 66 years ago
- Headquarters: Columbus, GA, USA
- Products: Caps
- Owner: MV Sport
- Website: thegameheadwear.com

The Game Headwear is a headgear brand, specialising in caps and currently owned by MV Sport. TGH started in 1960 as a sports equipment company, focusing on the minor leagues and school teams. The registered trademark was done in 1986.
