= Galvin Green =

Swedish golf clothing brand

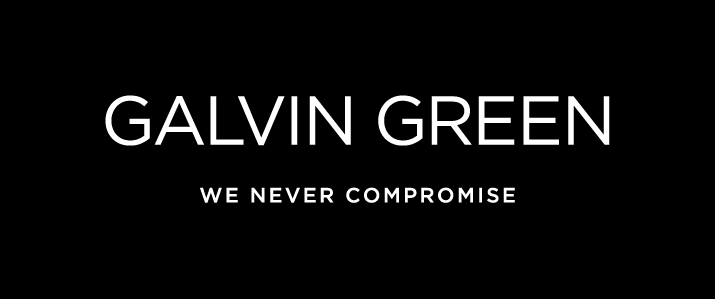
- Type: Private
- Founded: 1990
- Founder: Tomas Nilsson
- Headquarters: Växjö, Sweden
- Area served: Europe; Scandinavia; North America; Middle East; Asia
- Products: Golfing apparel, outerwear, jackets, trousers, pullovers, shirts, base layers, caps, hats, belts, accessories
- Website: galvingreen.com

Galvin Green is a golf clothing brand based in Växjö, Sweden. The company was established in 1990 by entrepreneur Tomas Nilsson. Galvin Green designs and sells multi-layer garments for the game of golf, sold via golf retail stores, on-course shops and authorized online retailers.

== History ==
In the early 1990s, the majority of golfers wore dark-colored, ill-fitting rain suits that became extremely heavy when it rained and stayed in their golf bag until the next downpour. By 1995, Galvin Green had launched a full range of waterproofs in bright colors that incorporated a high level of detail never seen before in golf apparel. A series of 'firsts' then followed in quick succession – half-zip rain jackets, zip fly trousers, jackets without front pockets, adjustable chest tabs, cuffs with rain channels, stretch fabric with various color options.

Galvin Green is now among the world's leading golf apparel brands and dominates the rainwear sector in the UK & Ireland. The company entered the U.S. market for the first time in 2013.

== Ryder Cup Collection ==
Galvin Green is a licensee of Ryder Cup Europe and was selected to be part of a new 'Exclusive Collection' for the 40th Ryder Cup at Gleneagles, Scotland in September 2014. This collection includes specially designed garments using cutting edge materials in Gore-Tex, Gore-Tex Paclite, Windstopper, INSULA and VENTIL8 fabrics featuring a distinctive silhouette of the famous Ryder Cup trophy.

== Sponsorships ==
PGA of Sweden

Galvin Green is currently one of five main sponsors for the PGA of Sweden.

PGA of Germany

Galvin Green is the official clothing outfitter and one of 24 partners of the PGA of Germany, having first signed an agreement in 2009.

PGA of Denmark

Galvin Green has been the official clothing supplier to the PGA of Denmark since 2009 and is one of five principal sponsors providing financial support and golf clothing packages to PGA professionals and members.

PGA of Canada

Galvin Green signed a multi-year agreement in March 2013 to become the official clothing supplier to the PGA of Canada and provide PGA of Canada branded shirts, sweaters and outerwear.
