= Sting Sports =

Australian sports equipment company

- Company type: Private
- Industry: Sports equipment
- Founded: 2003; 23 years ago
- Founder: Amir Anis
- Headquarters: Melbourne, Australia
- Area served: Worldwide
- Products: Boxing gloves and helmets
- Website: stingsports.com

Sting Sports is an Australian sports equipment company focused on boxing and mixed martial arts. The company was founded in Melbourne, Australia in 2003 by Amir Anis. Sting Sports was selected as the official AIBA boxing glove and official supplier for the 2014 Commonwealth Games and 2016 Summer Olympics.

The company manufactures and commercialises boxing gloves and protective gear such as helmets.

== Sponsorships ==
Sting Sports has a number of partnerships both domestically and internationally including Boxing Australia, USA Boxing, Boxing NZ, Boxing Canada, Italian Boxing Federation and has recently secured the sponsorship of the 2018 Gold Coast Commonwealth Games in April 2018.

It also has held sponsorships AIBA's APB and is the current sponsor of the World Series of Boxing.

== See also ==
- List of fitness wear brands
