= Zoke =

Chinese swimwear company

- Type: Public
- Industry: Textile
- Founded: 1996; 30 years ago
- Headquarters: Shanghai, China
- Products: Swimwear
- Website: zoke.cn

Zoke Chau G (洲克) is a Chinese manufacturing company of swimwear, headquartered in Shanghai and founded in 1996. As of 2000, the company was among the most visible swimwear brands in China. It is one of the local premium Chinese brands similar to Li Ning brand for sportswear. The company's main factory is in Quanzhou, Fujian.
