= Onda (surname) =

Onda (written: 恩田) is a Japanese surname. Notable people with the surname include:

- Riku Onda (恩田 陸, born 1964), Japanese writer
- Yoshie Onda (恩田 美栄, born 1982), Japanese figure skater
- Yuichi Onda (恩田 祐一, born 1980), Japanese skier
