= Let's Bands =

Brand of exercise equipment

- Product type: Fitness good
- Produced by: Sports and more Ltd.
- Country: Malta
- Introduced: October 2013
- Markets: Sports, physiotherapy
- Website: letsbands.com

Let's Bands is a sports equipment brand of resistance bands manufactured by Sports and more Ltd., a Maltese company. The brand name is specialized in the development, conception, and sports training with resistance bands made of stretch fabric in Europe and USA. Its training devices are designed for routines and rehabilitative exercises in fitness and rehabilitation facilities. Let's Bands's approach to fitness is covered in a workshop for trainers, physiotherapists and amateurs. It also includes an education course for health and fitness professionals who are concerned about muscle and joint pain. Let's Bands is the original creation of Nina Romm, Valeria Trupia, Niko Schmitz, and Uno Gomes inspired by their Powerband. The brand was acquired in 2015 by Active Resistance Fitness, LLC, an American company.

== See also ==
- General fitness training
- Physical medicine and rehabilitation
