= Live Breathe Futbol =

Soccer/football Clothing Brand

- Founded: 2011
- Founder: Ebun Olaloye, Domenick Cucinotta
- Headquarters: Philadelphia, Pennsylvania, United States
- Products: Clothing, Accessories, Sports Apparel
- Owner: Ebun Olaloye
- Website: livebreathefutbol.com

Live Breathe Futbol is a soccer (football) clothing brand started in 2010 by Ebun Olaloye & Domenick Cucinotta while students at Temple University in Philadelphia.

The company began selling soccer-inspired T-shirts online, but in the fall of 2012 released the LBF is Forever collection. This collection included a track jacket, scarf, hoody, sweater and T-shirt. Famed soccer journalist Keith Hickey (Goal.com) wrote about the collection, saying, “The LBF Fall/Winter line takes America’s cult soccer lifestyle label to the next level.”

The brand grew more in 2013, and was featured in The Philadelphia Inquirer after being one of the winners of FedEx’s small business grant contest. The Rebels and The Little Victories collections were released that year. Passion Soccer Boutique, Village Soccer Shop, and Paradise Soccer Club began carrying LBF products.

In 2014 the FIFA World Cup in Brazil served as a major catalyst for growth for the company, with the American Futbol and World Cup Winners collections doing very well (Forbes). That year, LBF also secured its first European retailer, Unisport, headquartered in Denmark.
