= Athleta (athleisure brand) =

American clothing brand

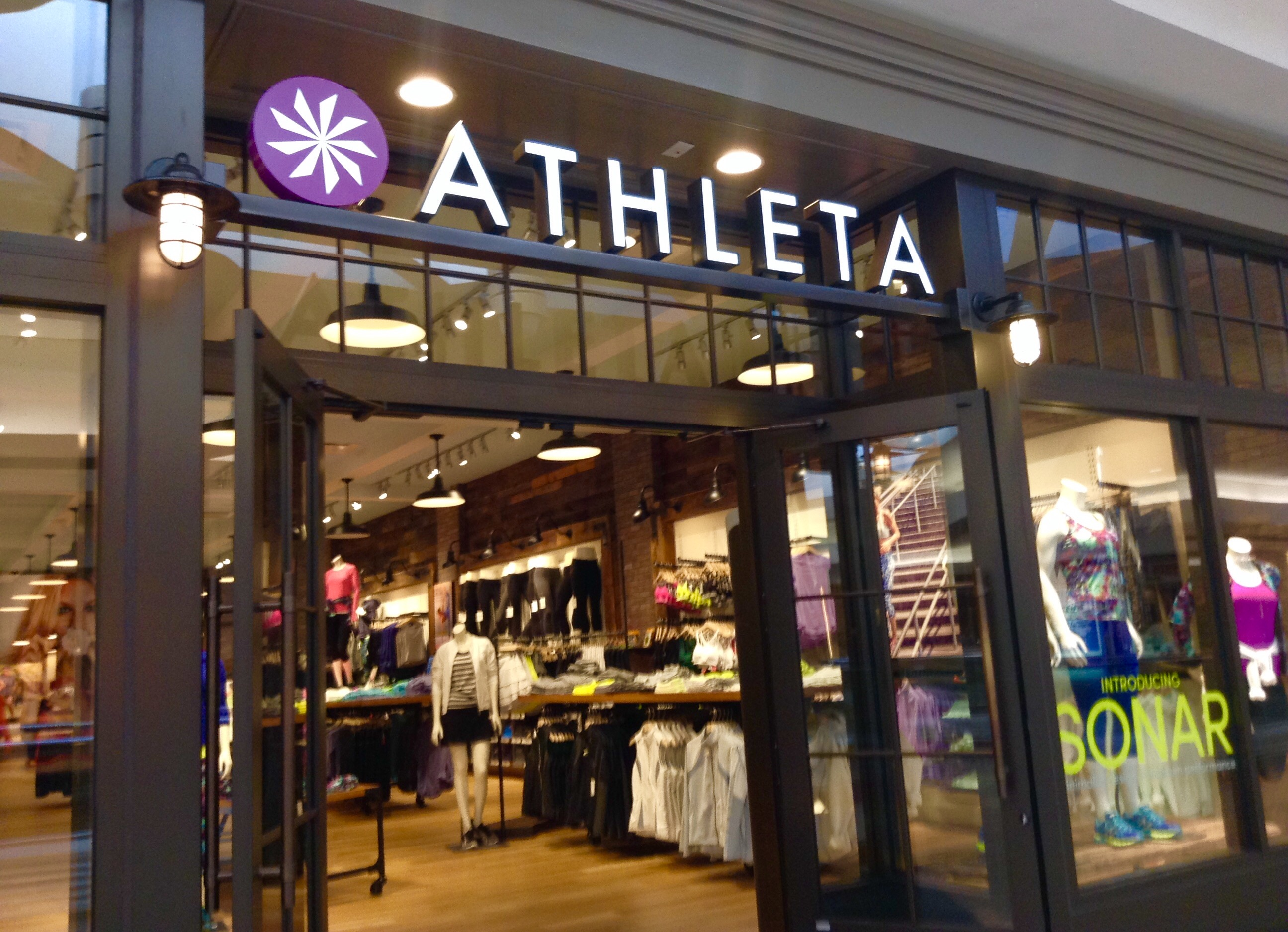
An Athleta retail outlet at Westfarms mall in West Hartford, Connecticut in 2015

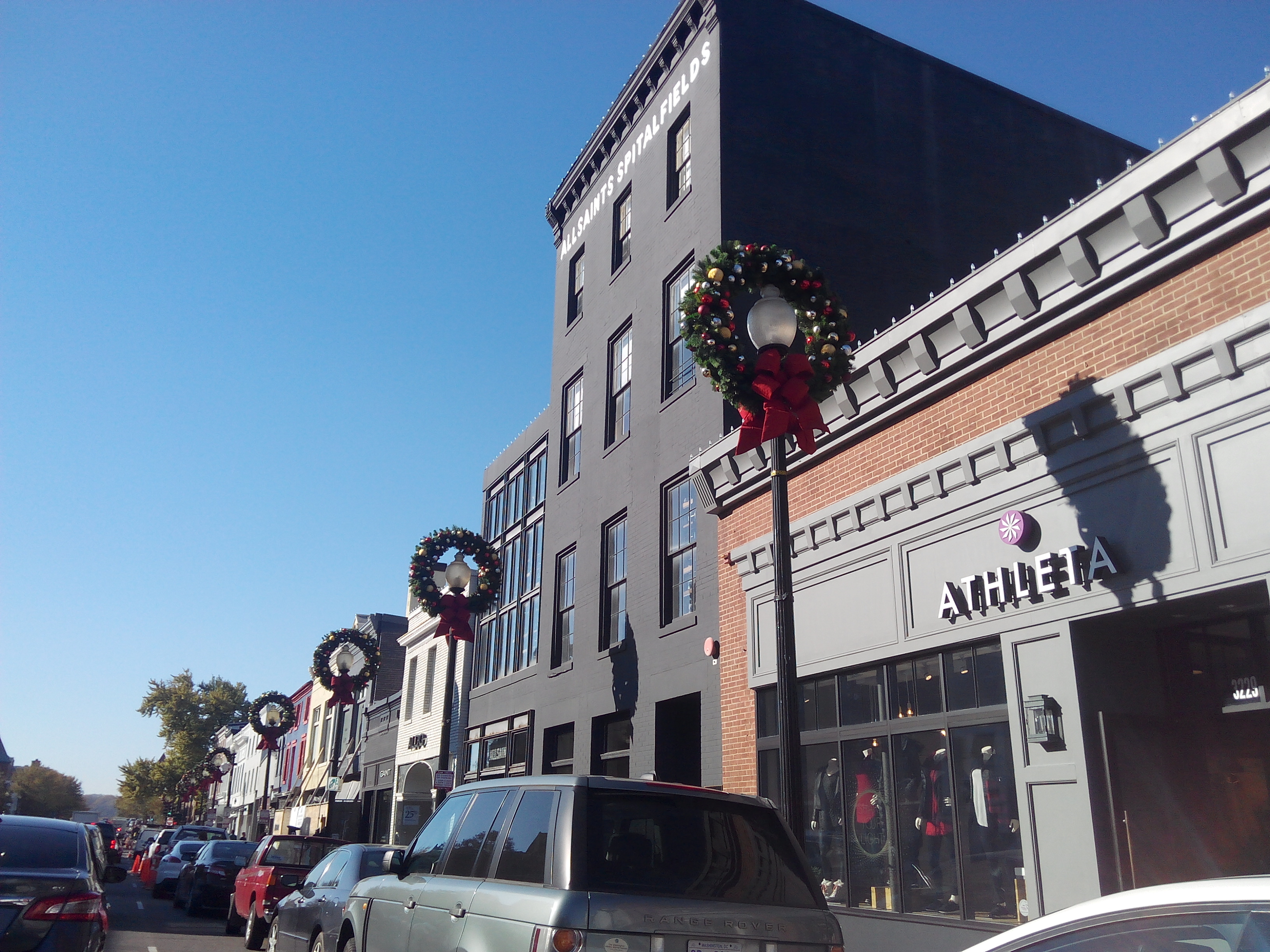
Athleta storefront in Georgetown, Washington, DC

Athleta is an athleisure fashion brand owned by Gap Inc.

== History ==
Athleta was founded in 1998 as an independent women’s athletic apparel company focused on combining performance clothing with stylish, everyday wear. In 2008, Gap Inc. acquired Athleta for approximately $150 million and expanded the brand into physical retail stores, opening the first brick-and-mortar location in Mill Valley, California, in 2011. In 2018, Athleta committed to higher environmental standards by becoming a certified B corp.

Maggie Gauger, former head of Nike‘s North America women’s business, is its global brand president and chief executive officer. She replaced former CEO, Chris Blakeslee.

In 2026, Athleta partnered with the San Francisco Ballet as their official athletic partner.

== See also ==
- Alo Yoga
- Aritzia/TNA
- Beyond Yoga
- Fabletics
- Lululemon
- On
- Vuori
