= Ivivva athletica =

Youth sportswear brand

Ivivva Athletica, styled as ivivva, was a youth brand founded by lululemon athletica in 2009. ivivva was created in order to cater to a younger demographic and focused on creating athletic sportswear for girls ages 6–14. The company launched with its first store in Vancouver, Canada in December 2009, and had over 70 stores and pop-up shop locations across Canada and the United States. In 2012, ivivva opened its first American stores in New York, Chicago, Boston, Bellevue and Orange County. ivivva’s clothes were designed for athletic pursuits such as dance, running, yoga, ice skating, gymnastics, and on-the-court sports.

In June 2017, lululemon announced the closure of multiple ivivva stores and started focusing the brand online. As of 2024, all ivivva locations have been closed.
