= Audimas =

Sportswear and apparel manufacturing company

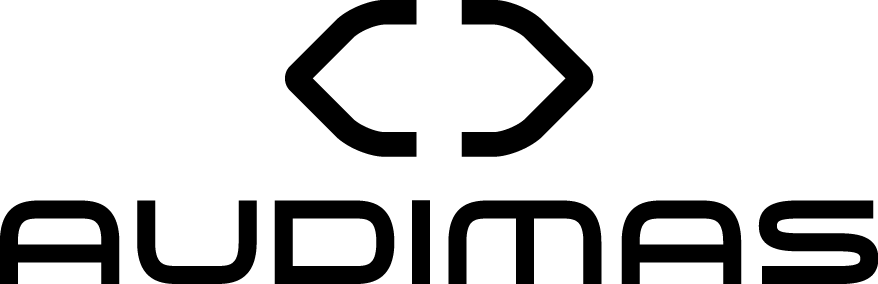

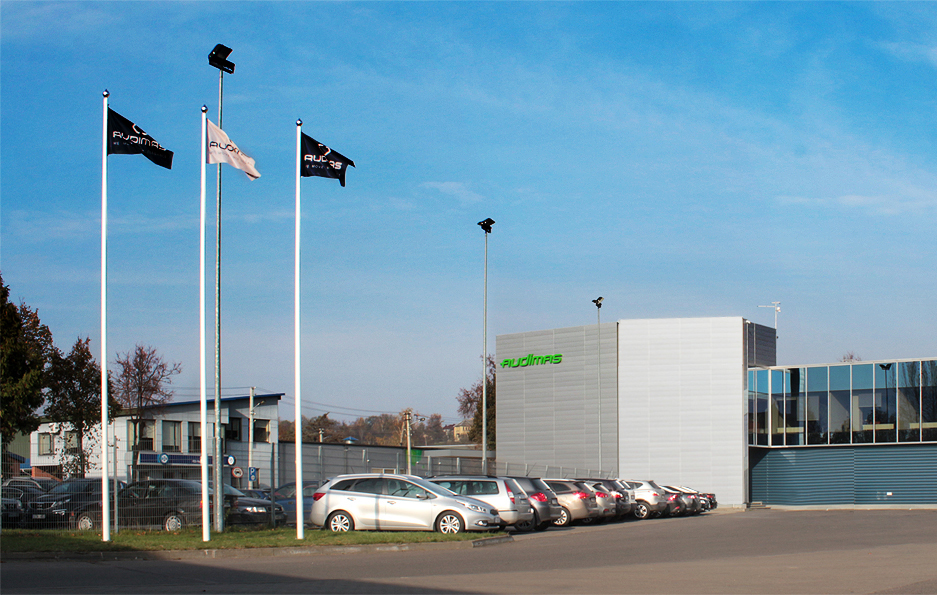
- Audimas headquarters in Kaunas, Lithuania
- Native name: AB Audimas
- Type: Joint stock
- Industry: Retail, Apparel
- Founded: 1931 in Kaunas, Lithuania
- Headquarters: Raudondvario Rd. 80, Kaunas, Lithuania
- Number of locations: 10 (2018)
- Area served: Worldwide
- Key people: Lina Šlegerienė (CEO)
- Products: Sportswear, Sportswear, Accessories
- Revenue: ▼€19.9 million (2024)
- Website: audimas.com

Audimas is the largest sportswear manufacturer in the Baltic States with the headquarters in Kaunas, Lithuania.

== History ==
The joint-stock company Audimas was established in 1931 in Kaunas (Lithuania) and opened its own manufacturing facilities, producing sportswear. In 1991, after the re-establishment of Lithuania's independence, the company started its new period of business and development.

In 1997, the first retail store belonging to the company opened. The first seasonal collections with Audimas trademark were introduced to the market. In 1998, Audimas signed its first sponsorship contracts with sports clubs. In 2001, Audimas introduced its first TV commercial and the slogan "Freedom of Movement".

In the first three-quarters of 2002, Audimas's total sales amounted to 45.4 million litas (13.16 million euros), a significant increase from 42.5 million litas the previous year.

The first store in Latvia (Riga) was opened in 2002, but the country later (2008) was heavily affected by the economic crisis and rental prices were raised, so the company had to close it. At the end of 2013, Audimas returned to the market of Latvia and opened its first store in Riga for the second time.

In 2003, an extra line of clothing was created for the winter sport. In 2007, Audimas updated its brand logo. In 2008, Audimas opened its first e-shop. In 2010, all company manufactured products were available in e-shop.

In 2011, all participants of the Lithuanian expedition to the Antarctica wore clothing the company designed and made for them. In 2012, Lithuanian designer Juozas Statkevičius presented outdoor clothing line for women specially created for Audimas. The company distributed Statkevičius' designed "Muscle suit" originally created for his 2013 Spring. In 2013, two new concept retail stores opened in Vilnius (Lithuania).

In 2014, Audimas sold its first franchise in Ukraine and opened its first brand store in Kyiv. The company also initiated a joint project for street basketball Basketball court renovation in major Lithuanian cities.

In 2016, Audimas's sales revenue fell by 10% to 27.2 million euros, and net profit fell by almost 40%.

In August 2018, the asset management company LitCapital acquired 60% of Audimas. In 2021, Donatas Pušinskis became CEO of Audimas.

=== Olympic's Official sportswear ===
Since 1999, the company has been cooperating with the National Olympic Committee of Lithuania and manufactured sportswear for the Lithuanian athletes who participate in the Olympics and national competitions. Audimas was the official wear of the Lithuanian Olympic team the following years:

- 2000: the Summer Olympic Games in Sydney (Australia)
- 2002: the Winter Olympic Games in Salt Lake City (US)
- 2004: the Summer Olympic Games in Athens (Greece)
- 2006: the Winter Olympic Games in Turin (Italy)
- 2008: the Summer Olympic Games in Beijing (China)
- 2012: the Summer Olympic Games in London (United Kingdom)
- 2013: the Winter Olympic Games in Sochi (Russian Federation)

In 2014, Audimas began sponsorship of Belarus National Olympic Committee. One of the first outcomes of this new agreement was the Belarus Olympic team wearing the company-manufactured sportswear in Sochi Olympic Games (2014).

=== Other sponsorships ===
Audimas manufactures and provides kit uniforms for sport teams in and around Lithuania. Company currently sponsors basketball club BC Pieno žvaigždės. In 2010–2011, Audimas sponsored BC Žalgiris. The company was a long-time sponsor of BC Lietuvos rytas. In the past, Audimas was sponsoring Latvia national basketball team as well.

Audimas sponsored the Lithuanian athletics federation and supported the Lithuania national athletics team.

== Description ==
=== Activities ===
Audimas is a joint stock company ("AB") and almost 90% of its shares belong to the three key shareholders.

Audimas has two manufacturing divisions in Kaunas and Jonava (Lithuania), the subsidiaries in Belarus and Latvia (since 2013). Audimas has a retail and wholesale network in Lithuania. As a retailer, Audimas runs directly operated and franchise stores. As a wholesaler, Audimas works with local sportswear retailers and brand owners on business-to-business (B2B) basis. In 2007, the company expanded its retail network to Poland.

The company runs 14 branded (directly operated) stores in all major cities of Lithuania, one branded store in Riga (Latvia), 11 franchise stores (10 in Lithuania and one in Ukraine) and one e-store. Since 2008, Audimas produces four clothing collections per year, these are dedicated for every season of the year separately (Fall, Winter, Spring and Summer).

Audimas exports its products to Europe, especially Germany, Poland and Finland, as well as Middle East (United Arab Emirates) and Baltic States (Latvia, Estonia). 80% of the company's products are exported to European Union countries. In addition, Audimas is manufacturing for other brands and supplies products to Switzerland, Italy, Germany, France, Great Britain, Sweden and the United States of America. In the past, the company was also working with Nike Inc. on such basis (Audimas manufacturing divisions were used as contractual factories by Nike) and provided to this partner with roughly 35000 clothing sets per year.

The company has about 300 suppliers and about 300 people work in its manufacturing divisions (2011).

In 2014, the company sold about 40% of apparel production with its own brand and the rest with other brand names including Assos, Lucas Hugh, Rapha and others.

=== Products ===
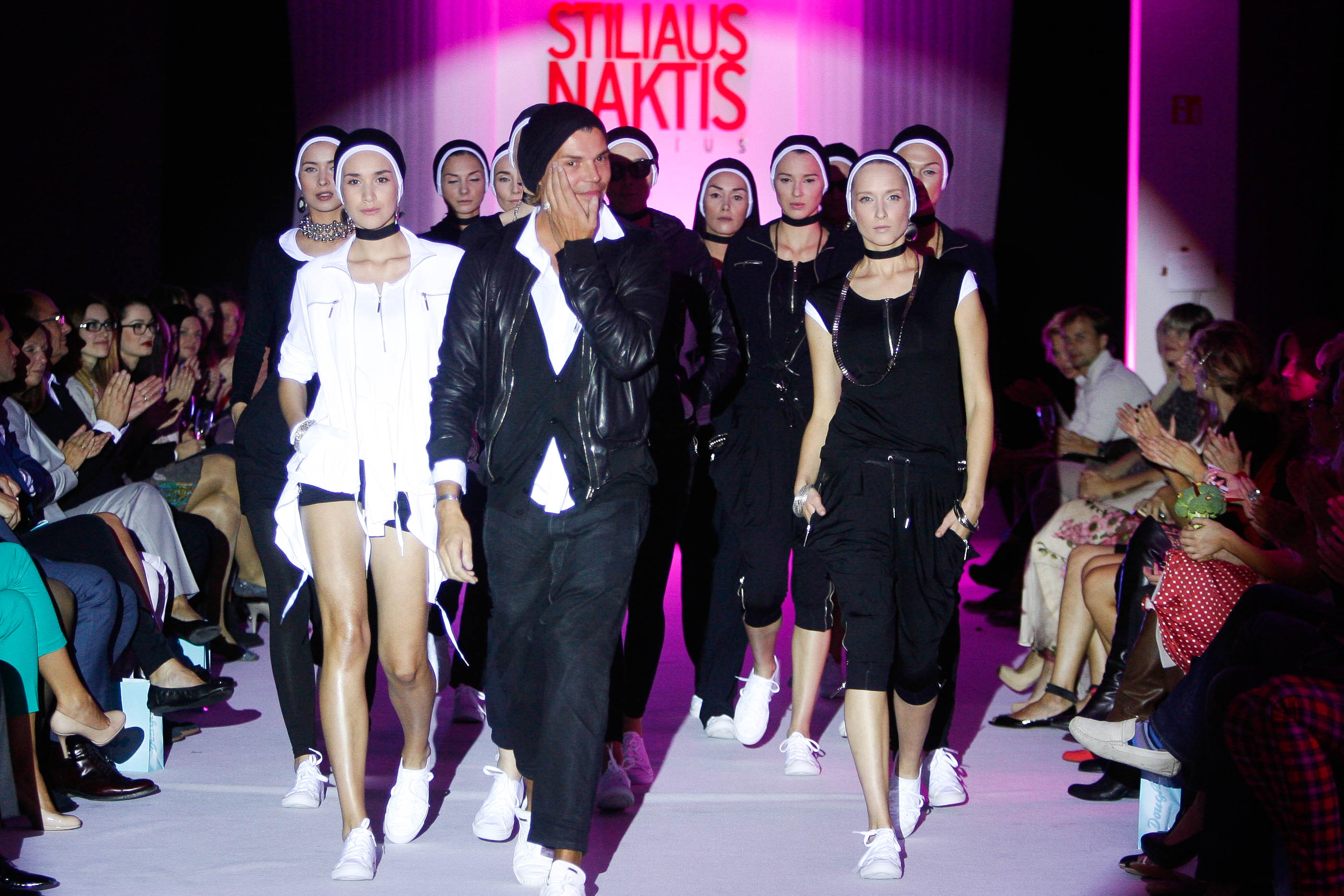
Juozas Statkevicius on stage at his "Black And White" collection presentation

The company produces sports and active lifestyle wear for women and men. Audimas manufactures the following products: tops (shirts, t-shirts, polo shirts), outerwear (jackets, pants, blouses, tunics, skirts, dresses, coats, jackets, overalls), swimsuits, cycling jerseys and sports clothing (basketball wear), undergarments (lingerie, bras, panties, socks). In addition, the company produces headgear (hats, kerchiefs), accessories (bracelets, belts, gloves, scarves), towels and backpacks.

Audimas seasonal clothing collections are usually divided into themes. Recent collection "Autumn - Winter 2014" is divided into four themes: an active lifestyle, active sport, limited and special. Company's active indoor wear is designed for gym, exercises, body training, basketball and fashion. Active lifestyle products range is designed for traveling, winter sports, bike wear, tennis wear and swimwear.

Special clothing lines usually are created by Lithuanian and foreign fashion designers, including Juozas Statkevičius, Sandra Straukaitė, Aleksandras Pogrebnojus, Kristina Kalinauskaitė, Kristi Andress and others.

== Awards ==
- 2001, 2003 and 2004: "Lithuanian Exporter of the Year" by the Lithuanian Confederation of Industrialists.
- 2001: "best IKEA supplier" in the Baltic states
- 2005: "Mercury" prize by the Lithuanian Chamber of Commerce in Latvia for the successful business development in Latvia.
- 2012: "Good Design" (Lithuanian design prize) for the official Lithuania national Olympic team wear in London Olympic Games.

== Marketing ==
=== Retail store ===
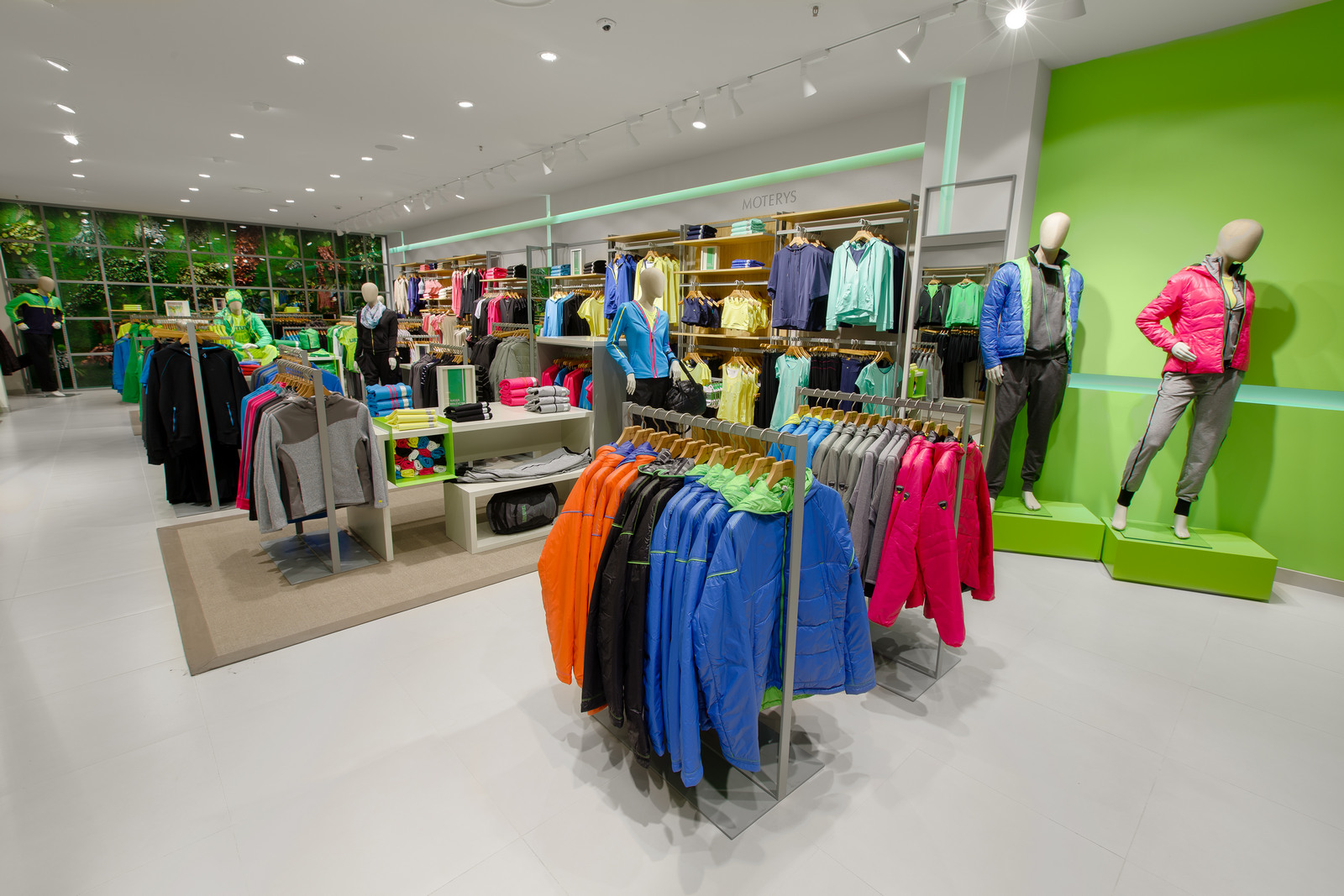
Inside Audimas new concept store

The creative idea behind the newest concept of the Audimas retail stores is a loft with a view combining so called "home" and "action" areas. The facade and the entrance should welcome the shopping centre visitors to come and visit Audimas store. The facade of the store should communicate the brand changes to the visitors. The facade signboard is made of bamboo wood with LED lighting and TV screens (Digital Signage) presenting seasonal communication. To realize the "Window with a view" store interior idea, the back area of the retail store is equipped with a plant wall. This is how the company illustrates its marketing idea of the synthesis of the natural and the technical. An important highlight of the store interior is a wall of changeable color which should serve as a background for mannequins wearing brand's new collection items, as well as LED lighting. These details is intended to help communicating Audimas new season's updates to shopping centre visitors before they actually enter the store. The interior of the central store area (or the "home" area) illustrates the home interior. The sales equipment should remind the customer a large closet. The central displays of the sales floor is installed using home-like elements, carpets, armchairs, picture frames and shelves. Such composition is supplemented with natural looking mannequins. The "action" area of the new concept Audimas retail store includes items that should stimulate customers desire to travel. Each store is equipped with a different item stimulating visitors this kind of desire. That is another marketing way Audimas chooses to attract visitors to its products and increase retail sales.
