= Beyond Yoga =

Yoga fashion brand

- Founded: 2005
- Founder: Jodi Guber Brufsky; Michelle Wahler
- Owner: Levi Strauss & Co.
- Website: beyondyoga.com

Beyond Yoga is a Los Angeles-based athleisure and yoga fashion brand founded by Jodi Guber Brufsky and Michelle Wahler in 2005. The company has been owned by Levi Strauss & Co. since 2021. Nancy Green has been the company CEO since 2024.

== History ==
Beyond Yoga was formed in 2005 and officially launched in 2006 by co-founders Michelle Wahler and Jodi Guber Brufsky.

The company was purchased by Levi Strauss & Co. for $400 million in September 2021.

== Marketing ==
In 2025, the company launched a new brand platform and creative campaign featuring an original spoken-word anthem written and performed by Issa Rae.

== See also ==
- Lululemon
- Alo Yoga
- Athleta
- On
