= Vuori =

American contemporary clothing brand

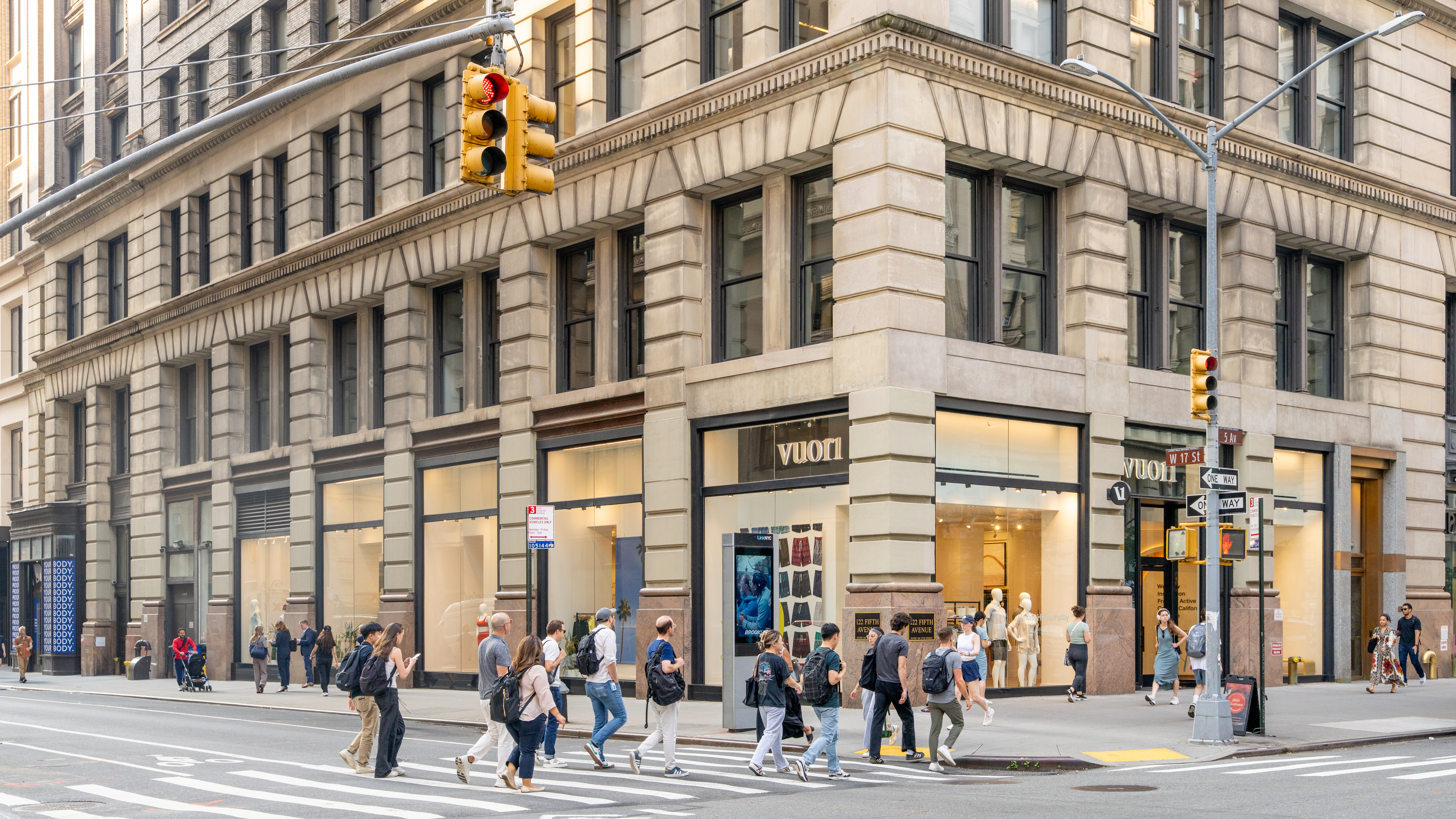
- Vuori store in Manhattan
- Type: Private
- Industry: Apparel
- Genre: Athleisure
- Founded: 2015; 11 years ago in Encinitas, California, US
- Founder: Joe Kudla
- Headquarters: Carlsbad, California, US
- Number of locations: 40 Stores (2023)
- Key people: Joe Kudla (CEO)
- Website: vuoriclothing.com

Vuori is an American contemporary clothing brand headquartered in San Diego County, California, with its flagship store located in Encinitas, California. It was founded by Joe Kudla in 2015 as a retailer of athletic and athleisure clothing, and has expanded to sell lifestyle apparel and other merchandise. An US$825 million funding round led by General Atlantic and Stripes valued the company at over $5 billion. SoftBank and Norwest Venture Partners participated in the funding round. Founder and CEO Joe Kudla retains majority ownership of Vuori.

Vuori has 40 stores in major US markets such as Los Angeles, Chicago, Denver, New York, San Francisco, and Boston. Its products are sold at Nordstrom, REI, Equinox, and other retailers. In addition to its hometown flagship store in Encinitas, Vuori has flagships in the SoHo neighborhood of Manhattan and on Regent Street in London.

Vuori was certified as a Climate Neutral brand, meaning it measures and offsets all its carbon emissions from product creation to delivery, but its certification has expired.

== History ==
Founder Joe Kudla began developing the concept in 2014 and formally launched the brand in 2015 with a focus on versatile men's activewear sold primarily through direct‑to‑consumer e‑commerce. Early on, the company also operated a pop‑up in downtown Encinitas, California to bring the brand to life for local customers.

The brand opened its first permanent store in spring 2016 in Encinitas. The company expanded to wholesale with REI, which tested the line in 2016 and subsequently expanded distribution, followed by placements at Nordstrom and Equinox.

The company reported reaching profitability by 2017 as growth accelerated.

The company's growth has been supported by several rounds of financing. In 2019, Norwest Venture Partners made a $45 million minority growth investment. In October 2021, SoftBank Vision Fund 2 invested $400 million at an approximately $4 billion valuation to support international expansion and a multi‑year US store rollout. In November 2024, Vuori completed an $825 million secondary tender led by General Atlantic and Stripes, reported at about a $5.5 billion valuation.

Vuori's has expanded its US retail presence from its Encinitas flagship to dozens of stores in major markets including Los Angeles, San Francisco, Chicago, Boston, New York and Denver. Store formats and sizes varied by location, with examples ranging from sub‑4,000-square-foot (370 m^{2}) neighborhood sites to larger flagships such as the roughly 6,000 sq ft (560 m^{2}) SoHo, New York space at 106 Spring Street.

International expansion began in 2022 with the launch of localized e‑commerce and selective wholesale in the UK, France, Germany, Ireland, the Netherlands, Australia and Canada, followed later that year by the opening of Vuori's first international store in London's Covent Garden.

== Etymology ==
Vuori means “mountain” in Finnish, reflecting founder Joe Kudla's passion for mountain climbing.

== See also ==
- Alo Yoga
- Athleta
- Lululemon
- Outdoor Voices
- Under Armour
