= New Jersey Marathon =

Annual race in the United States held since 1997

- Date: April
- Location: Jersey City, New Jersey, U.S.
- Event type: Road
- Distance: Marathon
- Primary sponsor: Goya, Newport, RWJBarnabas Health Jersey City Medical Center
- Established: 1997 (29 years ago)
- Website: www.jerseycitymarathon.com
- Participants: 7,395 finishers (2024)

The New Jersey Marathon and Half Marathon is now taking place in Jersey City NJ taking over the former, defunct race that took place in and around Long Branch, NJ. It started in 1997 as a revival of the Jersey Shore Marathon, which was held from 1972 to 1985. The name was changed to the New Jersey Shore Marathon in 1999, and changed again to the New Jersey Marathon in 2001. Then-governor James McGreevey declared it the official state marathon in 2005.

As of 2023, the Jersey City Marathon has been crowned the official marathon to represent the state of New Jersey. The race which was first held in April 2023 with over 6,000 runners from over 15 countries, is now in its fourth year. The next race is taking place on April 19, 2026 and is the first sell-out for this marathon.

== History ==
The original Jersey Shore Marathon was held from 1972 to 1985 every November, which was too close to the New York City Marathon, and the marathon dissolved in 1985 due to lack of participation and sponsorship.

In 1995, the idea of staging a world class marathon was promoted and a feasibility study showed great interest within the racing community. By 1997, the dreams of a world class marathon returning to the Jersey Shore became a reality and the first New Jersey Marathon was held on April 27, 1997. Over 1,000 runners registered for the race and over 800 of them finished.

In 2005, race officials were told by the governing body of Sea Bright, NJ that they could no longer use Ocean Ave., a critical section of the course, in the town for the race. Sea Bright officials cited safety concerns as the reason for the banning of all sporting events on the road.

The race moved south to Long Branch, and the finish of the course has been there since 2006. The Long Branch half-marathon was also added in 2006.

In 2010, hundreds of runners were incapacitated by heat stroke and dehydration during the marathon, with several people going into cardiac arrest and organ failure.

The 2020 in-person edition of the race was cancelled due to the COVID-19 pandemic, with all registrants given the option of running the race virtually, transferring their entry to 2021, or obtaining store credit of equivalent value. The 2021 marathon was also cancelled due to COVID-19, as Long Branch refused permission for a large gathering to be hosted in the town due to concerns over Delta variant.

Although the organizers hoped to return in 2022, they were neither able to reach an agreement with Long Branch nor find a new venue willing to accommodate the race. The 2019 race will remain the last one in the series, and the New Jersey Marathon is officially defunct. This created a void of spring races in the area, and in 2023 the Jersey City Marathon debuted. It was successful, and the race has grown bigger than the New Jersey Marathon.

== Course ==
External image
- Course map of full marathon in 2018

The old New Jersey Marathon started within the parking area of Monmouth Park Racetrack in Oceanport, New Jersey. It wound its way through the residential areas of Oceanport and Monmouth Beach before turning south into Long Branch. It then continued south through the beach communities of Deal, Allenhurst, Loch Arbour, Asbury Park and Ocean Grove, mostly within a block or two of the beach itself. The final 1.7 miles was run on the Long Branch boardwalk.

The course had no significant hills and was virtually flat, outside of some gentle rolling stretches early on and several bridge crossings. It was USATF-certified, which allowed runners to use the full marathon course to qualify for the following year’s Boston Marathon.

The new marathon and half marathon will be a USA Track & Field-sanctioned event on a USATF-certified course. The course will run through Jersey City.

== Winners ==
Key: Course record

Year	Male Winner	Time	Representing	Female Winner	Time	Representing
1997	Brian McCourt	2:39:34	NJ/USA	Kimberly Keenan	3:09:53	NJ/USA
1998	Brett Albert	2:37:43	NY/USA	Laurie Corbin	3:02:59	NJ/USA
1999	John Gouveia	2:40:55	NJ/USA	Kate McCoy	3:01:52	PA/USA
2000	Michael Harrison	2:41:02	VA/USA	Laurie Corbin	2:59:55	NJ/USA
2001	Michael Harrison	2:29:19	VA/USA	Wendy Locke	3:04:03	NJ/USA
2002	Maciej Ciepak	2:44:19	Poland	Dorian Meyer	2:57:28	NJ/USA
2003	Peter Heimgartner	2:37:22	NY/USA	Dorian Meyer	2:52:46	NJ/USA
2004	Gyula Szabo	2:33:55	NY/USA	Dorian Meyer	2:51:43	NJ/USA
2005	Jacob Cooper	2:36:55	NY/USA	Jennifer Meyer	3:09:05	CT/USA
2006	Richard Tessier	2:31:37	QC/CAN	Connie Grace	3:04:22	NY/USA
2007	Anthony Cioce	2:32:27	NJ/USA	Molly Mahany	3:10:03	NY/USA
2008	Oz Pearlman	2:33:09	NY/USA	Kathryn Bowser	3:04:51	PA/USA
2009	Michael Arnstein	2:38:42	NY/USA	Lauren Uhler	2:52:10	NY/USA
2010	Michael Arnstein	2:37:53	NY/USA	Holly Parker	3:13:37	MA/USA
2011	Oz Pearlman	2:28:19	NY/USA	Bronawyn Oleary	3:02:22	NJ/USA
2012	Jason Page	2:33:13	NC/USA	Megan DiGregorio	3:00:44	MD/USA
2013	Oz Pearlman	2:28:23	NY/USA	Elizabeth Drews	3:00:11	NJ/USA
2014	Oz Pearlman	2:29:24	NY/USA	Rachel Clattenburg	2:57:58	NJ/USA
2015	Thomas McConville	2:32:30	NY/USA	Sara Belles	3:05:01	CT/USA
2016	Robert Dennis	2:33:16	NJ/USA	Greta Sieve	2:53:06	NJ/USA
2017	Jeff Powers	2:32:22	PA/USA	Annie Onishi	2:54:17	NY/USA
2018	Leif Fredericks	2:23:56	ID/USA	Caitlin Phillips	2:41:43	NY/USA
2019	Sean Clark	2:25:51	PA/USA	Meghan Bishop	2:42:17	NY/USA
2020	cancelled due to coronavirus pandemic					
