= Alo Yoga =

Athletic apparel retailer

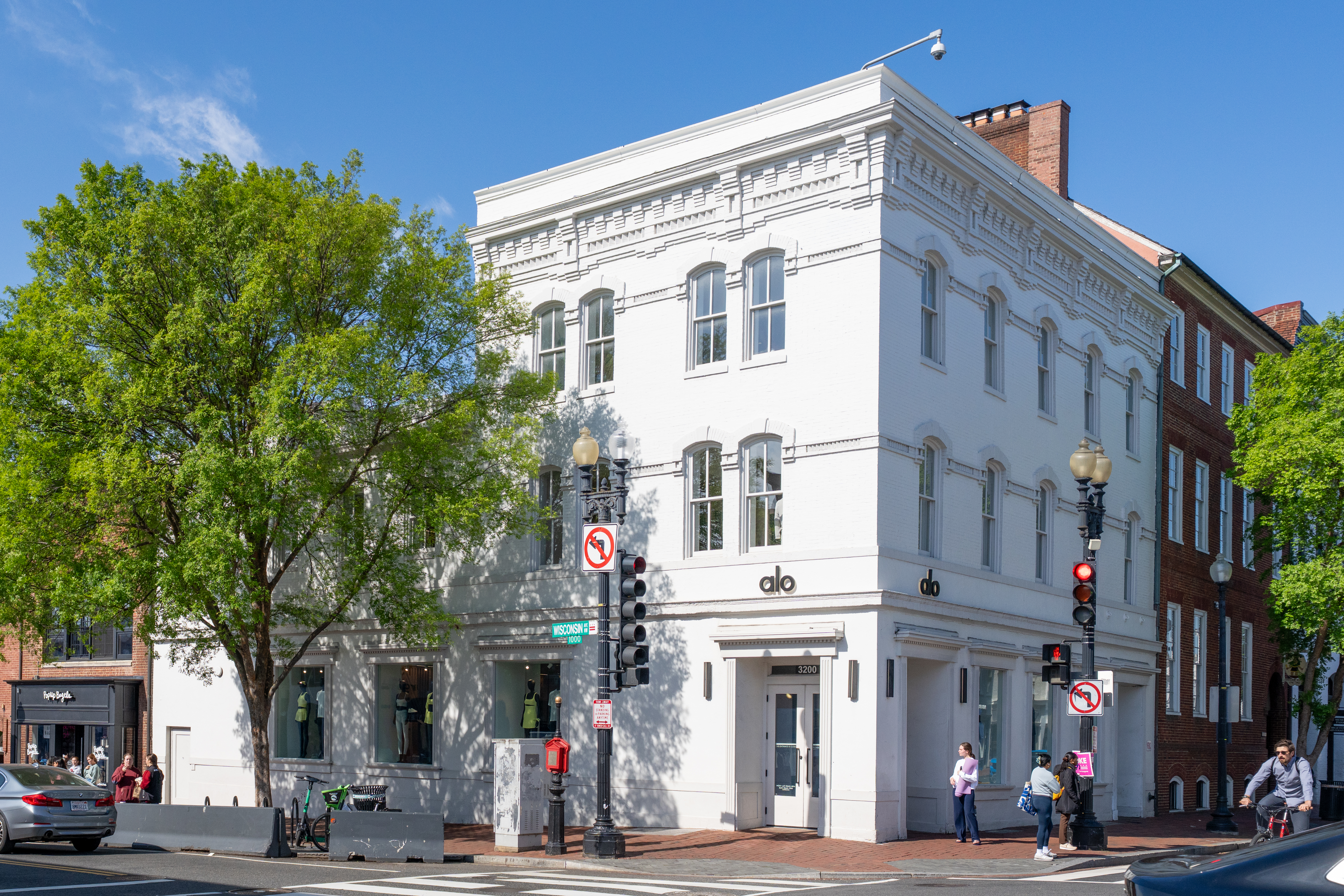
- Storefront in Georgetown, Washington, D.C.
- Type: Private
- Industry: Apparel
- Founded: 2007; 19 years ago in Los Angeles, California, US
- Founders: Danny Harris; Marco DeGeorge
- Headquarters: Beverly Hills, California, US
- Key people: Danny Harris (CEO)
- Parent: Color Image Apparel
- Website: aloyoga.com

Alo Yoga (stylized as alo) is an American premium athletic apparel retailer headquartered in Los Angeles. It was founded in 2007 by Danny Harris and Marco DeGeorge. The name is an acronym for "air, land, ocean".

== History ==
Alo Yoga was founded in 2007 in Los Angeles by Danny Harris and Marco DeGeorge, childhood friends who had become interested in yoga as a treatment for anxiety and a back injury, respectively. Alo opened its first store in Beverly Hills on April 20, 2016. The name stands for "air, land, and ocean". The brand rose to prominence when celebrities who received free products such as Kendall Jenner, Hailey Bieber, and Bella Hadid wore Alo in paparazzi photographs. Jisoo from BLACKPINK and Jin from BTS are brand ambassadors.

Alo is headquartered in Beverly Hills. As of October 2023, the company operated more than 50 brick-and-mortar stores.

On 10th January 2026, Alo appointed a new International CEO, Benedetta Petruzzo, to focus on market strategy, brand identity and client experience, whilst managing the brands global operations and international expansion. Petruzzo has a history in the luxury fashion industry where she was previously a managing director at Dior, and prior to that, a CEO of Miu Miu. Petruzzo stated she will keep wellness at the core of Alo's proposition whilst working alongside the two current brand owenrs who will remain co-CEO's together.

Alo has expanded beyond athletic wear. A line of beauty and wellness products, ALO Wellness System, was launched in December 2020. ALO launched its first shoe in 2023, focused on recovery, and the shoe collection now includes running, trail, and street shoes. In 2023, the company launched ALO Atelier, a premium line with a strong focus on travel.

Alo promotes mindfulness and posts images of yoga practitioners on its Instagram page. The company became the "official wellness partner" of New York Fashion Week in September 2021, holding yoga workshops and other events.

In 2023, Alo expanded internationally with a store on Kings Road in London, and in 2025 expanded into Asia with a store in Dosan Park in Seoul. In March 2025, Alo opened a two-story retail store at the Beirut Souks, in Beirut, Lebanon. In May, Alo opened its first Philippine store at Greenbelt mall in Makati. In June, the brand opened a beach club and boutique at the Mandarin Oriental in Bodrum. In May 2026, Alo expanded into France and opened two new stores. At 45 Rue Gambetta, Saint-Tropez, one store opened May 7th, followed by their second store in Cannes May 11 at 62 La Croisette. Both stores opened during their most traveled season, displaying menswear, womenswear, accessories collections and their newest luxury bag collection at both stores. In-store experiences are offered at both the Saint-Tropez and Cannes stores, including psychic readings, sound bowl healing, ear seeding and journal customization. As well as physical stores, Alo also expanded it's wellness experiences. From May 12 through June 14 2026, whilst the Cannes Film Festival took place, Alo transformed the Hotel Martinez pier into a wellness destination to further promote the opening of their stores. The pier was filled with 40 custom Alo sunbeds in sun-kissed brown, ivory and navy, each paired with an umbrella and side table, whilst also offering fresh juices, wellness programming, a run club and beach yoga.

In 2024, Alo launched the Alo gym, an invite-only wellness club in the Alo Beverly Hills offices that is frequented by celebrities such as Glen Powell and Justin and Hailey Bieber.

In 2025, Alo rebranded it's online fitness app, Alo Moves, to Alo Wellness Club and made the app free to all members of their loyalty program.

In September 2025, Alo launched its first collection of luxury handbags, with a campaign photographed by fashion photographer Steven Meisel, featuring supermodels Amelia Gray, Candice Swanepoel and Daiane Sodré. This collection is not avaliable online and they are only on display in two Alo stores, the SoHo flagship store in New York City, and the Beverly Hills flagship store in California. The bags will also be displayed at New York Fashion week. Alo offer the option of joining a mailing list where customers can book appointments and turn their purchase into an experience. By releasing exclusive products and experiences, Alo is differentiating themselves from sportswear competitors such as Nike and On by placing themselves further into the luxury market.

In 2025, Alo was named in a $150 million class action lawsuit for FTC violations regarding deceptive marketing tactics from the brand and its affiliate influencers.

In March 2026, Alo marked International Women's Day by hosting free wellness classes, including Pilates, yoga, meditation, and sound baths across nine countries, partnering with independent studios to support women founders.

In May 2026 The Lana, a hotel from the Dorchester Collection in Dubai, formed a partnership with Alo and from that date The Lana became Alo's exclusive hotel partner in Dubai. This collaboration ties in extremely well with the wellness opportunities already offered at the hotel and Alo's brand. For example, The Lana hosts a series of wellness activities during the Dubai Fitness Challenge. The Lana now features Alo yoga mats and pilates accessories in all signature suites, allowing guests to have their own space and make as much use of the facilities as desired. For people who are keen to make use of the equipment and opportunities offered, additional equipment is availiable on request. The hotel runs classes at different times of the day to further prove how it is designed for guests to take a more intuitive approach. For example, starting the morning with a powerful yoga flow overlooking Dubai's skyline or unwinding in the evening through mindful movement. The Lana additionally offers a curated programme of wellness sessions, some open to guests of the hotel, some you need to purchase a ticket for and some for Alo community members who may be in the surrounding area. Sound healing and pilates sessions are offered.

In summer 2026, the Alo Yacht set sail on May 17. A 72-metre, 1,800 gross tons superyacht, docked opposite the Hotel Martinez in Cannes during the Cannes Film Festival 2026. The yacht then sailed to Monaco for the Formula 1 Grand Prix weekend, where an exclusive morning pilates session was organised inviting over 500 models and influencers. These included Kelly Piquet, Kika Gomez, Alexandra Saint Mleux, Rebecca Donaldson, and Magui Corceiro. This wellness experience was invitation only and offered pilates, personal training and EMS training on board. As a further expansion of Alo's wellness clubs which are currently based in Los Angeles, New York City, Seoul, and London, the yacht also offered recovery modalities including IV therapy, lymphatic draining massages, and chiropractic care. It is the largest yacht the Italian shipyard has ever produced, accommodating 12 guests and a crew of 21. The yacht has a diesel-electric propulsion system developed with Siemens Energy. On board, you can also find a fully equipped gym with a fold down sea terrace, massage suite, sauna, cold plunge pool, hair salon, jacuzzi and hydroponic vegetable cabinets.

== See also ==
- Athleta
- Beyond Yoga
- Lululemon
- On
- Vuori
