= Onda (sportswear) =

Portuguese sportswear brand

Coordinates: 41°18′51″N 8°44′16″W

- Company type: Subsidiary
- Industry: Retail, textile
- Founded: 1999; 27 years ago
- Headquarters: Barcelos, Portugal, Portugal
- Area served: Worldwide
- Products: Surfwear • Streetwear
- Website: ondaworld.com/ing/

Onda is a Portuguese sportswear brand founded in Barcelos, Portugal. It is the official provider of sportswear to the Olympic Committee of Portugal.

== History ==
The brand Onda started in Barcelos, Portugal, in 1999. The company P&R Têxteis, S.A., that already produced sports equipment for over 20 years, decided to create its own sportswear brand. It was named Onda (which means, in Portuguese, Wave), associating it with the sea and aquatic sports. The first equipment to be produced were essentially for thermal protection.

== Products ==
- Onda Bikewear
- Onda Triathlon
- Surfwear Collection
- Wetsuits Collection
