= The Big Break VII: Reunion at Reunion =

- Hosted by: Vince Cellini; Stephanie Sparks
- Location: Ginn Reunion Resort, Reunion, Florida
- No. of episodes: 7

Release
- Original release: February 25, 2007

Season chronology
- ← Previous; The Big Break VI: Trump National

The Big Break VII: Reunion at Reunion featured sixteen competitors from previous seasons of The Big Break returning to compete for PGA, Champions and LPGA Tour exemptions at the Reunion Resort & Club in Orlando, Florida. The series premiered on The Golf Channel on February 25, 2007 and was won by Tommy "Two Gloves" Gainey, who originally competed on The Big Break IV: USA vs. Europe.

Competitors included:

- Mark "Moose" Farnham, The Big Break I
- Don Donatello, The Big Break II
- Mike Foster, Jr., The Big Break II
- David Gunas, Jr., The Big Break II
- Pamela (Crikelair) Garrity, The Big Break III: Ladies Only
- Cindy Miller, The Big Break III
- Valeria Ochoa, The Big Break III
- Tommy "Two Gloves" Gainey, The Big Break IV: USA vs. Europe
- Edoardo Gardino, The Big Break IV
- Nikki DiSanto, The Big Break V: Hawaii
- Kim Lewellen, The Big Break V
- Ashley Gomes, The Big Break VI: Trump National
- Laura London, The Big Break VI
- Kelly Murray, The Big Break VI
- Gary Ostrega, The Big Break VI
- Briana Vega, The Big Break VI women's champion

Laura London indicated in her interview that The Big Break VII was actually cast well before the completion of filming of The Big Break VI and before London herself had been eliminated.

== Show format ==
Each show will feature two to three challenges, the outcome of each influencing who stays and who goes home. Each challenge will demand precision shot-making designed to simulate conditions that players face every week on tour.

Competitions in The Big Break VII are coed team events with the losing duos going to an Elimination Challenge. The coed teams were formed by pairing the top female & top male, 2nd best female & 2nd best male, etc. The teams were then seeded by their performance in the next challenge. Each week, only half of the duos played. Duos alternated from being exempt for the episode, to playing for survival the next episode. Competitions in The Big Break VII are coed team events with the losing duos going to an Elimination Challenge. Once there, teams are split and males compete against males and female take on other females.

The original duos were:

- Ashley & Don (#1 seed)
- Kim & Mike (#2 seed)
- Bri & Tommy
- Nikki & Kelly
- Laura & Mark
- Cindy & Gary
- Pamela & Dave
- Valerie & Edoardo

Once down to eight players, the competition became every man and woman for themselves. This change of format mocked the original format seen in the earlier seasons. Unlike the previous season, only one person would win, rather than the top person from each gender.

== Elimination Chart ==
Contestant	Ep. 2^{1}	Ep. 3	Ep. 4	Ep. 5	Ep. 6^{2}	Ep. 7	Ep. 8	Ep. 9	Ep. 10	Ep. 11	Ep. 12
Tommy	IN	WIN	IN	WIN	IN	WIN	HIGH	WIN	LOW	HIGH	WIN^{7}
Ashley	WIN	IN	WIN	IN	HIGH	WIN	WIN	LOW	WIN	LOW	OUT
Mike	WIN	IN	LOW	IN	IN	LOW	LOW	LOW	WIN	OUT^{6}	
Dave	IN	LOW	IN	LOW	IN	WIN	WIN	WIN	OUT		
Don	WIN	IN	WIN	IN	WIN^{3}	WIN	WIN	OUT^{5}			
Laura	LOW	IN	LOW	IN	HIGH	HIGH	OUT				
Bri	IN	WIN	IN	WIN	IN	OUT					
Pamela	IN	LOW	IN	LOW	HIGH	QUIT^{4}					
Kelly	IN	WIN	IN	OUT							
Nikki	IN	WIN	IN	OUT							
Mark	LOW	IN	OUT								
Kim	WIN	IN	OUT								
Edoardo	IN	OUT									
Valeria	IN	OUT									
Gary	OUT										
Cindy	OUT										

- ^{1} In episode 1, nobody was eliminated. However, teams competed for the top seed and a $5,000 bonus. The team of Don Donatello (Big Break II) /Ashley Gomes (Big Break VI) edged out the Mike Foster (Big Break II) / Kim Lewellen (Big Break V) duo by one point to win the top seed.
- ^{2} In episode 6, it was announced that the current duos were disbanded and the remaining contestants would compete as individuals for the rest of the series.
- ^{3} In episode 6, Don won the ultimate immunity competition. The victory was worth either $5,000 or a one-time immunity that can be used at any point until the competition is whittled down to four players. Nobody was eliminated in this episode
- ^{4} Due to conflict with other players, Pamela withdrew from the competition.
- ^{5} Donatello decided to play the Elimination Challenge rather than turn in the Ultimate Immunity he won in episode 6. Despite having immunity in his back pocket, Don was eliminated.
- ^{6} For the first time in Big Break history, the finals began at the final 3, rather than the final 2. Mike was eliminated in the first half of the stroke play match after he failed to win a sudden death match over Ashley.
- ^{7} Tommy won "The Big Break VII: Reunion at Reunion" after defeating Ashley in the 2nd half of the match play final. The final was nine holes and Tommy won 3 & 1.

Pink indicates the contestant is a female.
Blue indicates the contestant is a male.
Green background and WIN means the contestant won matchplay final and The Big Break.
Blue background and WIN means the contestant won immunity from the elimination challenge.
Light blue background and HIGH means the contestant had a higher score in the elimination challenge.
White background and IN means the contestant had a good enough score in the elimination challenge to move onto the next episode.
Orange background and LOW means the contestant had one of the lower scores for the elimination challenge.
Gray background and IN means the contestant had the episode off and was therefore safe.
Hot pink background and QUIT means the contestant withdrew from the competition.

Red background and OUT means the contestant was eliminated from the competition
