= The Big Break V: Hawaii =

- Hosted by: Vince Cellini; Stephanie Sparks
- Winner: Ashley Prange
- Location: Turtle Bay Resort, Kahuku, Hawai'i
- No. of episodes: 13

Release
- Original release: February 7 – May 9, 2006

Additional information
- Filming dates: October 16 – October 30, 2005

Season chronology
- ← Previous; The Big Break IV: USA vs. Europe Next → The Big Break VI: Trump National

The Big Break V: Hawaii was the fifth edition of The Golf Channel's reality television competition program, The Big Break. The show's premise is to award aspiring golf professionals exemptions into event on major tours, eliminating one contestant each week through a series of challenges until only one player is left.

The Big Break V: Hawaii was filmed at the Turtle Bay Resort of Oahu's North Shore in Hawaii from October 16 to October 30, 2005. The shooting location was apparently quite close to where ABC's hit series, Lost, also shot on Oahu, is filmed. The show premiered on The Golf Channel on February 7, 2006.

This was the second edition of the show in which all of the contestants were female, the first being The Big Break III: Ladies Only, which aired from February 8 to April 26, 2005.

The Big Break V: Hawaii was also the first edition of the show to begin with 11 contestants rather than the usual 10, as one of the contestants would be eliminated on the first episode, the first time anyone was eliminated on the season premiere. Vince Cellini and Stephanie Sparks returned to co-host their third edition of the show. The Big Break: All Access, the show's behind-the-scenes spinoff, returned for its second season. The Big Break IV: USA vs. Europe contestant Marty Wilde, Jr. hosted All Access. All Access premiered the night after the first episode.

Just after the show premiered, a calendar featuring the 11 contestants in model-style poses while wearing beachwear was released. It drew some criticism from the show's viewers, who said that The Golf Channel was more interested in potential contestants' looks rather than their playing skills, but the contestants themselves said they enjoyed doing the calendar shoot.

Ashley Prange was the show's eventual winner, defeating Jeanne Cho in the matchplay final, which aired on May 9, 2006, 5 & 4, in the show's most lopsided matchplay final victory to date.

== The prize package ==
The Big Break V: Hawaii contained the show's largest prize package to date for the winner. These prizes were:

- An exemption into the LPGA Tour's Safeway Classic, to be held in August 2006
- Entry into all remaining 2006 Futures Tour events, with waived entry fees and travel expenses (7 of the 11 contestants were already Futures Tour members)
- An endorsement deal with Bridgestone Golf
- A $10,000 shopping spree from Golfsmith
- Golf instruction from world-renowned teacher, Dean Reinmuth
- Fitness training from former The Big Break co-host, Katherine Roberts
- Mental coaching from Dr. Gio Valiante
- A 2006 Chrysler Crossfire Roadster

== The contestants ==
The contestants of The Big Break V: Hawaii. Left to right, standing: Dana Lacey; Kim Lewellen; Kristina Tucker; Katie Ruhe; Divina Delasin; Ashley Prange; and Nikki DiSanto. Left to right, kneeling: Jo D. Duncan; Becky Lucidi; Julie Wells; and Jeanne Cho.

- Jeanne Cho — born to South Korean parents in France, Cho began playing golf at age 12, and her parents eventually sent her to David Leadbetter's world-famous academy in Florida, where Jeanne decided to move to the United States permanently after two years. She played golf at the University of Florida, where she co-captained the women's team, and graduated cum laude with a 4.0 grade point average. Cho has also competed in the U.S. Women's Open, even missing her high school graduation to take part in it. She currently plays on the Futures Tour, and lives in Orlando with her fiancé Brian.
- Becky Lucidi — the Michigan-born Lucidi boasted the biggest accomplishment of all the contestants, having won the U.S. Women's Amateur in 2002. Five months later, she won the Mexican Women's Amateur, and in 2003, won a national championship for the University of Southern California in her senior year of college (she had played for two years at the University of New Mexico before transferring). She, too, plays on the Futures Tour, where she finished 2nd in her very first event, and lives in Poway, California.
- Dana Lacey — the show's first contestant from Australia (Perth, Western Australia, to be exact), Lacey had a successful amateur career, winning the Australian Junior Championship at age 17. Lacey was the only one of the 11 contestants who didn't attend college, although she did attend the Australia Institute of Sport for four years. Lacey also plays on the Futures Tour, where, in 2005, she finished 2nd in the Michelob ULTRA Futures Players Championship, losing out to eventual tournament winner Jenny Gleason in a playoff. Dana lives in Wilmington, Delaware.
- Katie Ruhe — born in Montpelier, Ohio, Ruhe began playing at age 9 after winning her first trophy in a tournament, despite shooting a 72 for just nine holes. In high school, Ruhe played on the boys team, and was named an All-American by the American Junior Golf Association. She chose to play golf at the University of South Florida because her grandparents lived close by, but the beginning of her college career was ravaged by bouts with both bulimia and anorexia, at one point weighing 105 pounds with a 5'9" frame. She turned her health around, and improved her game drastically, being named to the Conference USA team in both her junior and senior years. Ruhe currently lives in Wesley Chapel, Florida, and plays on the Futures Tour.
- Kristina Tucker — born Kristina Engstrom in Stockholm, the Swedish Tucker began playing golf in her homeland at age 10. She won the Swedish Girls Championship back-to-back, and moved to the U.S. in 1999 to play at Duke University, where she won three collegiate tournaments, and even got to meet President George W. Bush at the White House after her she and her teammates won the national championship her junior year. After graduating, Tucker returned to Sweden to play on the Telia Tour, where she won one event. In Sweden, Tucker attended the same high school as PGA Tour player Jesper Parnevik and had a class with Tiger Woods' wife, Elin Nordegren. Kristina lives in Pageland, South Carolina with her husband, Paul, whom she met at Duke, and also plays on the Futures Tour. On July 1, 2006, Tucker made the cut at the U.S. Women's Open in Newport, Rhode Island, becoming the show's first-ever contestant to make a cut in an event on a tour offered as a prize after taping The Big Break. She ended up finishing in a 4-way tie for 20th at 12-over.
- Kim Lewellen — the second-oldest contestant at 35, it took bribery from her father with hot dogs and other treats to even get Kim to go to a golf course at first. By age 14, she had grown to like the game, and was on her way to a successful collegiate career at the University of North Carolina, where she earned Division I All-American honors. In 2005, Lewellen was named one of the 50 greatest women golfers in the history of the Atlantic Coast Conference. In the mid 1990s, Kim played on the Ladies European Tour, but with no success. In 1997, Kim began playing on the Futures Tour, and won an event her first year. She stopped playing golf for some time so that she and her husband, John, an Episcopalian priest, could start a family. The couple now have two sons, Jack and Simon. Kim still plays on the Futures Tour, but also coaches the women's golf team at East Carolina University.
- Divina Delasin — Divina was the show's first-ever contestant to be a sibling of a professional on a major tour, as her sister, Dorothy Delasin, has won four times to date on the LPGA. Divina dropped out of high school to support her family and help Dorothy get through the LPGA Qualifying Tournament, at one point, holding down three jobs. Divina caddied for Dorothy at the beginning of the ladder's LPGA career, but once Dorothy won for the first time, Divina was able to go back to school and attend college at Foothill College, but mainly to pursue her own golf dreams. Divina currently works as an assistant professional and a coach for San Francisco's First Tee program, with hopes of opening her own golf school someday.
- Jo D. Duncan — born in St. Louis, Duncan was the oldest contestant at 39. Duncan at first played both golf and basketball, but at 15, took golf more seriously, as her small frame made basketball success unlikely. She played on the boys' team in high school, and was the only girl in her entire county playing high school golf. She got a partial scholarship to Missouri State University, then known as Southwest Missouri State, where she played with and against women for the very first time. After failing to get through the LPGA Qualifying Tournament in both 1996 and 1997, Duncan became a teaching professional. She also competes in long drive competitions, playing in the RE/MAX World Long Drive Championship three times.
- Julie Wells — born in Eugene, Oregon, Wells was a last-minute replacement, as one contestant withdrew on the first day of filming. Julie began playing golf at age six, and saw much success in high school, being named both Oregon's Athlete of the Year and Golfer of the Year. A successful career at the University of Idaho saw Wells helping her team win the Big West Conference championship, and her garnering Player of the Year honors. Julie currently works at the Oregon Golf Club, and lives in Wilsonville, Oregon with her husband.
- Nikki DiSanto — DiSanto was the least experienced of the show's contestants, never having played in a pro tournament before the show was filmed. Like Duncan, she competes in long drive competitions. DiSanto played college golf at the College of Canyons in Valencia, California, where she was team captain both years. DiSanto is a part-time model and teaches golf to juniors in Los Angeles.
- Ashley Prange — the show's eventual winner, Prange comes from a golfing family, as her father and three of her uncles are teaching pros. She began playing at age 2, but didn't start competing until she was 12. Prange, like Lewellen, played collegiate golf at North Carolina, where she won three events, and was an NCAA First Team All-American her senior year. Prange plays on the Futures Tour, and on March 19, 2006, while the show was airing, picked up her first professional win in the Greater Tampa Duramed Futures Classic. She would win for a second time on July 2 in the Northwest Indiana Futures Golf Classic in Hammond, Indiana.

=== Elimination chart ===
Contestant	Ep. 1	Ep. 2/3^{1}	Ep. 4	Ep. 5	Ep. 6	Ep. 7	Ep. 9	Ep. 10	Ep. 11	Ep. 12	Ep. 13
Mulligan; Winner	None	None	Ashley Kristina Kim	None	None	Kristina	None	Kim	None	None	None
Ashley	IN	HIGH	IN	WIN	LOW	WIN	WIN	IN	HIGH	WIN	WIN^{4}
Jeanne	IN	WIN	HIGH	LOW	IN	IN	HIGH	LOW	LOW	LOW	OUT
Julie	IN	WIN	WIN	LOW	HIGH	HIGH	LOW	WIN	HIGH	OUT	
Kim	IN	LOW	HIGH	IN	HIGH	HIGH	HIGH	HIGH	OUT		
Becky	WIN	LOW	LOW	IN	OUT		WIN^{3}	OUT			
Dana	LOW	WIN	WIN	IN	WIN^{2}	LOW	OUT				
Kristina	IN	IN	HIGH	WIN	IN	OUT					
Divina	IN	WIN	WIN	OUT							
Katie	IN	WIN	OUT								
Nikki	LOW	OUT									
Jo D.	OUT										

- ^{1} The 2nd elimination took place across two episodes. In the first hour, the contestants faced off in an immunity challenge. The second hour was where the 2nd contestant was eliminated.
- ^{2} Dana won a brand new Chrysler Crossfire Roadster for being the first individual to win 3 immunity challenges.
- ^{3} In episode 8, all previously eliminated contestants were brought back to compete in a series of challenges where the winner would be brought back. Becky won and returned to the competition.
- ^{3} Ashley won the final match 5 & 4 over Jeanne. This is currently the most lopsided victory to date.

Green background and WIN means the contestant won matchplay final and The Big Break.
Blue background and WIN means the contestant won immunity from the elimination challenge.
Light blue background and HIGH means the contestant had a higher score in the elimination challenge.
White background and IN means the contestant had a good enough score in the elimination challenge to move onto the next episode.
Orange background and LOW means the contestant had one of the lower scores for the elimination challenge.
Red background and OUT means the contestant was eliminated from the competition

== Season overview ==
=== Week one ===
A series of challenges saw contestants playing their way onto the show, as only 10 spots were available. The last challenge, one hole of golf, saw DiSanto and Duncan tie for the highest score, while Lacey clinched the ninth available spot by winning the challenge. In the one-hole playoff, DiSanto made par to eliminate Duncan.

=== Week two ===
Week two took place in two parts, with the "Immunity Challenge" taking one hour, and the "Elimination Challenge" taking another. The "Immunity Challenge" consisted of one hole of golf conducted under matchplay rules. In the challenge, Cho, Ruhe, Lacey, Delasin, and Wells all won their matches to earn the right to play the next day, while DiSanto, Lewellen, Lucidi, Tucker, and Prange had to go to the "Elimination Challenge," which consisted of putting challenges and hitting closest to the pin from a sand trap. In the end, DiSanto was eliminated.

=== Week three ===
The "Immunity Challenge" was a team affair, as the contestants were divided into teams of three, with each player being responsible for a shot on one hole of golf, with one player hitting the tee shot, the other hitting a shot onto the green, and the last having four attempts to sink a long range putt. With her team leading going into the putting portion of the challenge, Cho, paired with Lucidi and Ruhe, missed all four of her putting attempts, while Delasin, paired with Lacey and Wells, sunk her team's putt on her second attempt, helping the three gain immunity. The "Elimination Challenge" consisted of hitting an iron shot to a circle on a green from two distances. The battle to stay out of last came down to Lucidi and Ruhe, and it was Ruhe who ended up being sent home by just one point.

=== Week four ===
Delasin had developed shin splints, and could barely walk the next day. The "Immunity Challenge" consisted of the eight ladies hitting a shot from distances of 100 and 150 yards to a green with a circle. The circle size was determined by shots hit by LPGA players Beth Bauer and Lorie Kane, both of whom were making a cameo appearance. Hitting a shot to the closest of the two shots from Kane and Bauer got a contestant two points, outside of the shots one. Prange won immunity with a 5-point total over the two rounds. The "Elimination Challenge," the ladies had to hit three shots from three different distances to a green, and the closest to the pin on each shot moved onto the next show. The remaining four would have to play one hole of golf to determine who would go home. Lucidi, Tucker and Lacey won the distance challenges, sending Lewellen, Cho, Wells and a brave Delasin to the one hole playoff. All four made par, sending them back to the tee. On the second try, Delasin's leg problems got the best of her, and she ended up with the highest score on the hole, becoming the fourth contestant to leave the show.

=== Week five ===
In week two, Sparks and Cellini told the players that the first to win three "Immunity Challenges" would win a 2006 Chrysler Crossfire Roadster of her own. Going into week five, Lacey and Wells had each won two. The "Immunity Challenge" was the same as the one that eliminated Ruhe, but with two twists. The first was after each failed attempt to hit it into the circle, the player couldn't use the club she hit the shot with for the rest of the round (there were two). The other twist was that an orange circle was placed 7'11" from the pin. The contestant who could hit a shot into that circle would win $5,000 cash from 7-Eleven. In round one, only Lacey and Tucker hit the shot into the circle on their first attempts. In round two, they did it again, but Cho managed to stick her second attempt within eight inches of the cup, securing the 7-11 prize. In the playoff, Tucker hit the circle on her second attempt, while Lacey again stuck her shot in on one attempt, clinching her third immunity and the car. The "Elimination Challenge" dealt with hitting out of two bunkers to a green with three rings, the one being closest to the pin being worth five points, then a three-point circle, then a two-point circle. Anywhere outside of those circles, but still on the green was worth a point. The weather had been particularly uncooperative all day, with high winds and heavy rain. After the first round, only Wells and Cho scored any points. The second round came down to Lucidi and Prange, with Lucidi unable to send Prange home. After this episode aired, Lacey announced she would sell the car to pay back her parents for supporting her career, and to help her get through the LPGA's Q-School, despite her father's pleas for her to keep the car. She is presently hearing offers:

=== Week six ===
Five down, six left, and this time, the weather was much better. Prange won the "Immunity Challenge," in which the contestants hit three tee shots into a grid, from which they'd have to hit those shots onto a green with more painted rings around the pin for points. The "Elimination Challenge" had the five remaining players playing stroke play golf from two different locations: 72 yards and 178 yards. The 72 yard shot would have to be hit from behind a tree, after which the players would have to finish the hole. Whoever had the lowest score after the first location would be granted immunity, but a tie would send everyone to location two. The tie took place with Tucker in last, the scores carried over, and everyone went to the second location, where there was a water hazard in-between the tee box and the green. Cho and Lewellen decided to hit their shots to the fairway beside the hazard, while Wells, Lacey and Tucker decided to go for the green, but with different results. Lacey and Tucker's shots came up short and found the water, while Wells' shot made it across, only to land in the bunker behind the green. She, Cho and Lewellen all made it onto the next show, while Lacey won the war of attrition with a double-bogey that helped her beat Tucker by one shot, and send her packing (Tucker also made double bogey). But for Tucker and the other eliminated contestants, good news awaited.

=== Week seven ===
This episode was very different. The five remaining players were given a rest day, during which they did the calendar shoot. The six eliminateds would have one chance to play their way back into the competition, the first time in Big Break history any eliminated players had such a chance. Delasin was out after finishing last in a narrow zone fairway challenge. Duncan was out after a greenside bunker challenge. Ruhe mastered the challenge that knocked her out in week three, with her third attempt landing straight into the cup without even landing on the green. DiSanto was eliminated after that challenge, with Tucker out after a putting challenge. Lucidi and Ruhe played one hole of matchplay, in which Lucidi made birdie to earn her way back onto the show.

=== Week eight ===
With the number of players back to six, the "Immunity Challenge" was again made a team event, with the players split into pairs of two. The three pairs would play three holes in alternate shot format. One hole was a par-3, one a par-4, and the last a par-5. Prange was paired with Lucidi, Wells with Lewellen, and Cho with Lacey. After three holes, Lacey and Cho went to a playoff with Lucidi and Prange, with the latter pair winning the challenge. The other four were now paired against their teammates in the elimination, which was getting up and down from a bunker. The losers from each match would play each other for the right to stay on the show. Lewellen and Cho won both matches, meaning Wells and Lacey would play each other to stave off elimination. Wells won the match, and Lacey was out, though her new car was a nice reward for her efforts.

=== Week nine ===
The "Immunity Challenge" had the five remaining players playing "B-R-E-A-K," the golfing version of "H-O-R-S-E." Each player picked a shot location everyone had to hit from. Winning a location meant the other players got a letter, and also meant that the winner could add an extra letter to another player's bank. The winner of the challenge would be the only one who didn't spell out "BREAK." Wells easily dominated this challenge, failing to win only one location, and she also handed all of her extra letters to Prange. It would be the only time all season in which Wells would gain immunity. Elimination had the other four hitting shots from three different locations onto a green painted with horizontal lines for points. The leader after two locations would be safe from elimination. Lewellen led after two locations, so she got to sit back and watch along with Wells. Cho and Prange scored five and eight points at the final location to bring their scores up to 20 and 21, respectively, while Lucidi scored two points, and became the first Big Breaker ever to be eliminated twice in one season.

=== Week ten ===
There was no "Immunity Challenge" this time out, so it was straight to the elimination, where the final four would be paired against each other in two holes of stroke play, with the two losers playing each other for the right to be one step from the matchplay final. In the first match, Cho was with Prange. Both made par on the first hole, but Prange birdied the second hole to move on to the next-to-last show. In their match, Lewellen and Wells also made par on the first hole, but Wells made her way onto the next show with a par at the second hole, while Lewellen could only manage a bogey. Lewellen's putter failed her in the extra match. She had a chance to have a one-shot lead over Cho after the first hole with a two-putt, but missed them both, and so they went to the second hole tied. Lewellen was gone after making bogey, while Cho made par. During her "walk of shame," a walk in which the eliminated player walks with his or her back to a camera, Lewellen humorously walked to back edge of the beach next to the course, and threw her putter into the Pacific Ocean.

=== Week eleven ===
The last "Immunity Challenge" was a two-parter. First, the three players would hit four tee shots to a narrow grid on the fairway. Each shot that landed outside the grid would have distance taken away from it, depending on how far it landed outside of the grid. The lowest scoring player would go straight to elimination, while the top two would move on to a putting challenge. The top two in this case were Prange and Cho, and Prange would win the putting challenge, securing her place in the final. Elimination had Cho and Wells playing three holes with the modified Stableford scoring system, with one point for a par, three for a birdie, and five for an eagle, whereas a bogey would cost a point, and a double or worse three. After two holes, Cho had two points and Wells minus two. There was no miracle for Wells, and so, the final match would pit Cho against Prange.

=== Week twelve ===
The matchplay final had arrived. Cho was the first to lead after three holes, but her 1 Up advantage was gone at the very next hole, where she made double bogey to Prange's bogey. Prange would take the lead after eight holes, and never looked back, increasing the lead the following four holes, though she had help from many mistakes made by Cho. At the 14th hole, both Cho and Prange made par, securing the victory and big prize package for Prange.

== How Prange fared at the Safeway ==
Ashley missed the cut at her exemption, shooting 77s in the first two rounds of the 54-hole event (see her scorecard here: ).

== Big Break players at 2006 LPGA Qualifying School ==
Six players from The Big Break V went to the 2006 LPGA Qualifying School, or Q-school, tournament in an attempt to earn playing privileges for the 2007 LPGA season. The top 12 finishers and ties earned exempt status for the 2006 season. The next 41 finishers received non-exempt status.

- Jeanne Cho missed earning a fully exempt tour card by one position and one stroke. She is at the top of the list of non-exempt players for the 2006 season.
- Becky Lucidi finished 36th and earned non-exempt status.
- Dana Lacey did not advance beyond sectional qualifying.
- Ashley Prange finished 37th and earned non-exempt status.
- Kristina Tucker finished 27th and earned non-exempt status.
- Julie Wells did not advance beyond sectional qualifying.
