= The Big Break III: Ladies Only =

- Hosted by: Vince Cellini; Stephanie Sparks
- Winner: Danielle Amiee
- Location: Kingsmill Resort and Spa, Williamsburg, Virginia
- No. of episodes: 10

Release
- Original release: February 8, 2005

Season chronology
- ← Previous; The Big Break II Next → The Big Break IV: USA vs. Europe

The Big Break III: Ladies Only is the third installment of The Golf Channel's reality series, The Big Break. This installment first aired on February 8, 2005. The show was filmed in October 2004 at the Kingsmill Resort and Spa just outside Williamsburg, Virginia. The winner of this edition would receive exemptions into two LPGA events and a celebrity tournament (the American Century Championship) in 2005, not all of which aired on The Golf Channel. Also, a leading golf retailer, Golf Galaxy, was offering $5,000 so that the winning player could purchase whatever they need for the LPGA events, such as new clubs or other accessories. The first of those three tournaments was the Michelob ULTRA Open at Kingsmill, held at the golf resort where the show was filmed. The Michelob ULTRA Open is commonly referred to as the LPGA's "fifth major," much like The Players Championship is for the PGA Tour.

The ten hopefuls for the third season were Tasha Browner of Tarzana, California; Danielle Amiee of Newport Beach, California; Pamela Crikelair of Westchester County, New York; Valeria Ochoa, originally from Medellín, Colombia, but who has since moved to Miramar, Florida; Debbie Dahmer of Escondido, California; Jan Dowling originally from Bradford, Ontario, but who has since moved to Dallas; Cindy Miller of Silver Creek, New York; Sarah Sasse of Lincoln, Nebraska; Liz Uthoff of St. Louis; and Felicia Brown of Redondo Beach, California. Vince Cellini and Stephanie Sparks, who once played in the LPGA herself, albeit briefly, became the show's new hosts. The matchplay final was stellar. Crikelair and Amiee faced off, with Crikelair going 2 up after just three holes. Amiee came all the way back, and, at 1 up on the par 3 17th, sank a birdie to go 2 up, and clinch The Big Break III title 2 & 1. In addition to her exemptions and $5,000 gift card from Golf Galaxy, Amiee also won a new Chrysler Crossfire, which she gave to a friend who had helped her financially. Amiee also donated her Golf Galaxy certificate to a charity for underprivileged children.

Many fans consider this Big Break to be the best edition of the show yet. Dowling was perhaps the most popular player of the whole season among viewers and her fellow competitors, mainly for her class. Many viewers also considered Dowling the best golfer of the bunch. Viewers were disappointed when there was no vote asking to give an eliminated contestant another shot at her "big break", because Dowling, who was the fifth contestant eliminated, to the dismay of many fans, most likely would have won it.

Also for the first time, professional golfers from the tour handing out the exemptions made cameos. In the first episode of the season in which a contestant was eliminated (whom, by the way, would end up being Browner), LPGA winners Kelli Kuehne and Lorie Kane dropped by to participate in the season's first "Mulligan Challenge."

Amiee's first tournament, the Michelob ULTRA Open, did not go well as far as trying to make the cut was concerned. She had plenty of fans following her. In her first round, Amiee shot 79 on the par 71 course. The second round was pushed back a day due to rain, where Amiee shot 77, missing the cut in her first LPGA event. Her second event, the Corning Classic, never materialized, as she withdrew before the first round, citing a back injury, throwing her second exemption away. However, it is believed that Amiee withdrew because of media pressure over an alleged topless photo of her that was circulating around the Internet. There has been a great deal of discussion over the validity of the photo.

Meanwhile, Miller, who actually played on the LPGA Tour from 1979 to 1981, when she married former PGA Tour player Allen Miller (the couple are still married, and have three children), competed in the LPGA Championship, having earned a spot by winning the 2004 LPGA Teaching & Club Professionals national championship. She shot an 84 in the first round, and an 88 in the second round, missing the cut.

It was then Dowling's turn to play in an LPGA event. She's took part in the BMO Canadian Women's Open, where she shot a 77 in round one, and a 74 in round two to take a respectable 7-over for the tournament, though she still missed the cut. Dowling won the Canadian Women's Amateur Championship in 2000, helping her earn the Female Canadian Amateur Golfer of the Year Award; she was also individual champion of the Mid-American Conference in 1999 and 2000 while a student at Kent State University, and in her senior year at Kent State in 2002, she was given the Janet Bachna Award for Kent State Female Senior Athlete of the Year. While at Kent State, Dowling became friends with the winner of the 2003 The Open Championship, Ben Curtis. Dowling says her golfing hero is the great Canadian professional, Moe Norman, who died on September 4, 2004, over a month before the show began taping.

The season's website can be viewed here. Flash is required to view this, though. This link contains two pages of video from this season. The series preview video, which is on the second page, contains a portion of No Doubt's hit, "Just a Girl."

Like The Big Break II, this edition has been made available on DVD:

== Elimination Chart ==
Contestant	Ep. 2^{1}	Ep. 3	Ep. 4	Ep. 5	Ep. 6	Ep. 7	Ep. 8	Ep. 9	Ep .10
Mulligan; Winner	Jan	Cindy Danielle Debbie	Liz	Jan	Jan Liz Pam	Liz	None^{2}	None	None
Danielle	IN	IN	IN	IN	IN	IN	LOW	LOW	WIN^{3}
Pam	IN	WIN	IN	IN	LOW	IN	IN	WIN	OUT
Cindy	WIN	IN	IN	IN	WIN	WIN	WIN	OUT	
Liz	LOW	IN	IN	WIN	IN	IN	OUT		
Valerie	IN	LOW	HIGH	IN	IN	OUT			
Jan	IN	IN	LOW	IN	OUT				
Sarah	HIGH	HIGH	WIN	OUT					
Debbie	HIGH	HIGH	OUT						
Felicia	IN	OUT							
Tasha	OUT								

- ^{1} In the first episode, Jan won the skills challenge and was able to pick her room first.
- ^{2} During the 8th episode, it was announced that there would no longer be mulligan challenges.
- ^{3} Danielle won the final match 2 & 1 over Pam.

Green background and WIN means the contestant won matchplay final and The Big Break.
Blue background and WIN means the contestant won immunity from the elimination challenge.
Light blue background and HIGH means the contestant had a higher score in the elimination challenge.
White background and IN means the contestant had a good enough score to move onto the next episode during the elimination challenge.
Orange background and LOW means the contestant had one of the lower scores for the elimination challenge.
Red background and OUT means the contestant was eliminated from the competition
