= The Big Break VI: Trump National =

- Hosted by: Vince Cellini; Stephanie Sparks
- Winners: Denny Hepler; Briana Vega
- Location: Trump National Golf Club, Los Angeles, California
- No. of episodes: 12

Release
- Original release: September 26 – December 19, 2006

Additional information
- Filming dates: June 2006 – July 2006

Season chronology
- ← Previous; The Big Break V: Hawaii Next → The Big Break VII: Reunion at Reunion

The Big Break VI: Trump National was the sixth edition of The Golf Channel's reality television series, The Big Break. The show awards exemptions into selected events on major professional golf tours.

This is the first time the show was held at a course in California: Donald Trump's Trump National Golf Club in Los Angeles. Trump made a cameo appearance in the season premiere, in addition to appearing periodically throughout the show. This is also the first mixed-gender edition of the show. Nine men and nine women competed for exemptions onto the Champions Tour and LPGA Tour, respectively. The two Champions Tour events the men competed to qualify for were the Turtle Bay Championship and the Bank of America Championship, while the two LPGA events the women competed for entry into were the SBS Open at Turtle Bay and the Longs Drugs Challenge.

The show was taped in June and July 2006, and premiered on September 26, 2006 with the matchplay final broadcast on December 19, 2006.

== Contestants ==
=== Women ===
Contestant	Age	Hometown	Status
Rachel Bailey	25	Faulconbridge, New South Wales, Australia	Futures Tour player
Bridget Dwyer	25	Kailua, Hawaii	Futures Tour player
Ashley Gomes	23	Pleasanton, California	Western Athletic Conference individual champion at San Jose State University; Futures Tour player
Sarah Lynn Johnston	24	St. Charles, Illinois	Futures Tour player; Qualified for 2007 LPGA Tour exempt status after filming of The Big Break VI.
Laura London	25	Scottsdale, Arizona	Played on Futures Tour from 1999 to 2001
Annie Mallory	23	Fredericton, New Brunswick, Canada	Futures Tour player
Kristy McPherson	25	Conway, South Carolina	Futures Tour player; Qualified for 2007 LPGA Tour exempt status after filming of The Big Break VI
Karyn Stordahl-Utecht	25	Prior Lake, Minnesota	Former player for the University of Minnesota; 2005 Miss Minnesota
Briana Vega	23	North Andover, Massachusetts	Futures Tour player; Winner of 2004 Women's Golf Association of Massachusetts Amateur Championship

=== Men ===
Contestant	Age	Hometown	Status
Sid Corliss	56	Cumming, Georgia	Sun Belt Senior Tour player
Albert Crews	54	Homer, Louisiana	Qualified for 2005 U.S. Senior Open
Charlie Gibson	52	Windsor, California	Former All-American at Arizona State University
Denny Hepler	50	Warsaw, Indiana	Former Malaysian Open winner
Jeff Mitchell	51	Frisco, Texas	1980 Phoenix Open winner; 1980 first round co-leader at The Masters; former Texas Tech Red Raiders player and head coach
Kelly Murray	50	Reston, Virginia	Holds world record for longest recorded drive (684.8 yards)
Gary Ostrega	52	Westfield, New Jersey	Played on the PGA Tour from 1977 to 1979
Rocky Rockett	54	Gastonia, North Carolina	Sun Belt Senior Tour all-time leading money winner
Gavin Slabbert	51	Orange Park, Florida	Heartland Tour player

Ages are as of the time The Big Break VI was filmed in July 2006.

=== Elimination Chart ===
Contestant	Ep. 1	Ep. 2^{1}	Ep. 3	Ep. 4	Ep. 5^{2}	Ep. 6	Ep. 7	Ep. 8	Ep. 9	Ep. 10	Ep. 11
Bri	LOW	WIN	HIGH	WIN	WIN	IN	IN	WIN	LOW	WIN^{4}	WIN^{6}
Denny	WIN	IN	IN	WIN	IN	IN	LOW	LOW	LOW	WIN^{5}	OUT
Bridget	IN	IN	IN	WIN	WIN	IN	IN	LOW	WIN	OUT	
Jeff	WIN	IN	IN	WIN	IN	LOW	IN	WIN	WIN	OUT	
Rachel	IN	IN	IN	LOW	WIN	IN	IN	WIN	OUT		
Gary	IN	IN	IN	LOW	IN	IN	IN	WIN	OUT		
Ashley	WIN	IN	IN	WIN	WIN	IN	IN	OUT			
Charlie	IN	IN	OUT			WIN^{3}	HIGH	OUT			
Laura	IN	IN	HIGH	LOW	WIN	IN	OUT				
Kelly	LOW	WIN	HIGH	WIN	IN	IN	OUT				
Albert	WIN	IN	HIGH	LOW	IN	OUT					
Sarah	WIN	LOW	LOW	OUT							
Rocky	IN	LOW	LOW	OUT							
Kristy	WIN	IN	OUT								
Annie	LOW	OUT									
Gavin	LOW	OUT									
Karyn	OUT										
Sid	OUT										

- ^{1} In episode 2 through 4, the contestants competed in pairs of men and women during the immunity and elimination challenges.
- ^{2} In episode 5, the remaining Men and Women faced off for immunity. The winning team would be exempt for the next episode whereas the other team would face elimination the following episode.
- ^{3} In episode 6, Trump announced that the previously 4 eliminated males from the show would participate in a Playback Challenge. The winner would earn the right to compete in the Elimination Challenge with the five males still on the show.
- ^{4} Bri won "The Big Break VI: Trump National" Women's championship matchplay final by defeating Bridget 3 & 1.
- ^{5} Denny won "The Big Break VI: Trump National" Men's championship matchplay final by defeating Jeff 1 up on the 19th hole.
- ^{6} Bri became the ultimate winner in "The Big Break VI: Trump National" by defeating Denny Hepler in a nine-hole skins match. After winning the last 4 out of the 9 holes, Bri was awarded $21,000 and a new car, while the women who partnered with her in holes 6 through 8 split $11,000. Denny won $9000 while the men who partnered with him in holes 1 thru 5 split $9,000.

Pink indicates the contestant is a female.
Blue indicates the contestant is a male.
Green background and WIN means the contestant won matchplay final and The Big Break.
Blue background and WIN means the contestant won immunity from the elimination challenge.
Purple background and WIN means the contestant won the playback challenge and was back on the show.
Light blue background and HIGH means the contestant had a higher score in the elimination challenge.
White background and IN means the contestant had a good enough score in the elimination challenge to move onto the next episode.
Orange background and LOW means the contestant had one of the lower scores for the elimination challenge.
Gray background and IN means the contestant had the episode off and was therefore safe.
Red background and OUT means the contestant was eliminated from the competition

== Winners' exemption performances ==
Denny Hepler competed in the 2007 Turtle Bay Championship, played on the Palmer Course at the Turtle Bay Resort, Kahuku, Hawai'i, January 22–28. He finished tied for 72nd place, with a score of 222 (+6).

Briana Vega competed on her first sponsor's exemption in the 2007 SBS Open at Turtle Bay. She missed the cut and finished last, with a score of 161 (+17). Fellow BBVI competitors and 2007 LPGA exempt rookies Kristy McPherson and Sarah Lynn Sargent also played in the tournament; McPherson missed the cut and finished with a +5 150, while Sargent made the cut and finished tied for 73rd place with a score of 225 (+9).
