= The Big Break IV: USA vs. Europe =

- Hosted by: Vince Cellini; Stephanie Sparks
- Winner: Paul Holtby
- Location: Carnoustie Golf Links, Carnoustie, Scotland; Old Course at St Andrews, Scotland
- No. of episodes: 13

Release
- Original release: September 13, 2005

Additional information
- Filming dates: June 2005

Season chronology
- ← Previous; The Big Break III: Ladies Only Next → The Big Break V: Hawaii

The Big Break IV: USA vs. Europe was filmed in June 2005, and premiered on September 13 of the same year. The twelve hopefuls (including Bart Lower) were taken to Scotland's Carnoustie, and the Old Course in St Andrews to compete for exemptions into two European Tour events (the Algarve Open de Portugal and the Celtic Manor Wales Open), an endorsement deal with Bridgestone Golf, a two-year lease on a Ford Explorer, and a $5,000 gift card from Dick's Sporting Goods. The Golf Channel made this a competition between players from the United States and Europe, much like the Ryder Cup. Vince Cellini and Stephanie Sparks returned as hosts.

The six hopefuls representing Team USA were Lower; Randall Hunt from Los Angeles, who currently lives in Arlington, Texas; Tommy Gainey, known as "Two Gloves," who hails from Bishopville, South Carolina; T.J. Valentine from Plymouth, Massachusetts; David Carnell, a Miami resident who is originally from Park Forest, Illinois; and Paul Holtby from Simi Valley, California. Team Europe's six hopefuls were former British Amateur winner Warren Bladon of Leamington Spa, England; Guy Woodman from Old Windsor, England; Edoardo Gardino, a Crans-Montana, Switzerland resident who is originally from Azti, Italy; Marty Wilde Jr. from Tewin, England; Richard Gillot from Paris; and Thomas Blankvoort from Wassenaar, Netherlands.

Lower was the first contestant eliminated, surprising, considering the fact that he finished third on The Big Break II. Gillot, who won a Challenge Tour event in 2000, was the next to go, followed by Carnell, then Gardino. The USA-Europe elimination trade-off continued with Gainey getting the boot. It finally stopped with Hunt being eliminated in a two-part episode (the Immunity Challenge took a full hour, while Elimination took another). With just two members left, Team USA was given two episodes off so that the European team could be whittled down to its last two. In the first episode of this, ex-Amateur Championship winner Bladon was out, with Wilde to follow the next week. The final two were determined in a double-elimination episode, in which Woodman defeated Blankvoort and Holtby beat Valentine in separate 9-hole matchplay challenges. Holtby went on to defeat Woodman in the matchplay final, 1 Up. Unlike the previous editions, all the eliminated contestants stayed, followed the match and even took group photos with the winner.

In the Algarve Open, Holtby shot 1-over for two rounds, missing the cut by one shot.

Each team had one member with a claim to fame. European team player Wilde is the son of British singer Marty Wilde and the brother of Kim Wilde, who sang the 1981 hit, "Kids in America." Team USA member Valentine is the son of former professional bowler Jeffrey Valentine. Valentine also operates a popular golf logo brand company called 8 Under Par . Another European team member, Gardino, has caddied in two Ryder Cups (1999 and 2002), carrying bags for players like Sergio García, Miguel Ángel Jiménez, and José María Olazábal. Gardino also caddied for Ángel Cabrera in the 2005 Presidents Cup and 2007 U.S. Open. Gainey eventually won on the PGA Tour's three tours -- the Korn Ferry Tour, PGA Tour, and PGA Tour Champions.

During the show's run, a new behind-the-scenes show called The Big Break IV: All Access debuted and aired on "Top Shelf Wednesday," a weekly primetime block of programming hosted by Cellini. Big Break III alumnus Ochoa worked as a reporter for the All Access show.

Promotional ads leading up to the show's premiere were set to Bon Jovi's 1987 hit "Livin' On a Prayer."

The show's website can be found here: It, too, is available on DVD:

== Elimination Chart ==
Contestant	Ep. 2^{1}	Ep. 3	Ep. 4	Ep. 5	Ep. 6	Ep. 7/8^{2}	Ep. 9	Ep. 10	Ep. 11/12	Ep. 13
Mulligan; Winner	Team Europe	None	Team Europe	None	Team Europe	None	None	Team Europe^{5}	None	None
Paul	IN	WIN	HIGH	WIN	LOW	HIGH	IN^{3}	IN	WIN^{6}	WIN^{7}
Guy	WIN	IN	WIN	IN	WIN	IN	WIN^{4}	LOW	WIN^{6}	OUT
Thomas	WIN	HIGH	WIN	IN	WIN	HIGH	LOW	WIN	OUT	
TJ	IN	WIN	LOW	WIN	HIGH	LOW	IN^{3}	IN	OUT	
Marty	WIN	IN	WIN	HIGH	WIN	LOW	HIGH	OUT		
Warren	WIN	IN	WIN	LOW	WIN	HIGH	OUT			
Randal	LOW	WIN	HIGH	WIN	HIGH	OUT				
Tommy	HIGH	WIN	IN	WIN	OUT					
Edoardo	WIN	LOW	WIN	OUT						
David	IN	WIN	OUT							
Richard	WIN	OUT								
Bart	OUT									

- ^{1} In the first episode, Team Europe won the skills challenge. Each player won an opportunity to win a car, none of which won.
- ^{2} During the 7th episode, an immunity challenge took place. Both teams tied so during the 8th episode, everyone went into elimination. There was no immunity winner this round.
- ^{3} Due to the imbalance of the number of players on each team, the remaining members of Team USA were given the next two episodes off as Team Europe was in the process of being whittled down to two players.
- ^{4} After winning immunity, Guy won a Ford Vehicle after draining a 45 foot putt in the Ford Prize Challenge (in which the weekly winners of immunity participated)
- ^{5} In the 11th episode, the remaining teams squared off for a two-year lease on a Ford Explorer and all expenses paid trip back to Scotland were up for grabs, rather than a mulligan.
- ^{6} In the 12th episode, the remaining players from each team would have to face their own teammate in a 9 hole match play face off in order to win their spot in the final 2. Paul would defeat T.J. 5 & 4, Guy would defeat Thomas 3 & 1.
- ^{7} Paul won "The Big Break IV: USA vs Europe" 1 up over Guy.

Contestant was on Team USA
Contestant was on Team Europe
Green background and WIN means the contestant won matchplay final and The Big Break.
Blue background and WIN means the contestant won immunity from the elimination challenge.
Light blue background and HIGH means the contestant had a higher score in the elimination challenge.
White background and IN means the contestant had a good enough score to move onto the next episode during the elimination challenge.
Orange background and LOW means the contestant had one of the lower scores for the elimination challenge.
Gray background and IN means the player was safe and had the episode off.
Red background and OUT means the contestant was eliminated from the competition
