= The Big Break I =

Season of television series

- Hosted by: Rick Smith; Katherine Roberts
- Winner: Justin Peters
- Location: Treetops Resort, Gaylord, Michigan
- No. of episodes: 10

Release
- Original release: October 6, 2003

Season chronology
- Next → The Big Break II

The Big Break I was the first round of The Big Break, the Golf Channel's reality television program. The show's premise is to award an aspiring professional golfer exemptions into selected events or full-season exemptions on certain tours. The series premiered on October 6, 2003.

== Event ==
The contest was filmed over ten days at Treetops Resort near Gaylord, Michigan. The winner would receive exemptions into four selected events on the Canadian Tour in 2004 (all of which were broadcast by The Golf Channel).

The ten hopefuls for the first season were Randy Block of San Antonio; Garrett Garland of Northridge, California; Charles Calhoun of Marietta, Ohio; Justin Peters of Plantation, Florida; Steve Duemig of Clearwater, Florida; Anthony Sorentino of Rochester Hills, Michigan; Mark Farnham of Port Jefferson, New York; Craig Pawling of Sunrise, Florida; Jeff Brown of Hampton, Georgia; and Jon Roddy of Orlando, Florida. The show was hosted by Phil Mickelson's former swing coach, Rick Smith, and Katherine Roberts, who was dismissed as eye candy. In the end, Peters defeated Sorentino 3 & 1 in the matchplay final. Peters, though, failed to make the cut in any of the four Canadian Tour events he played in. He would go on to win the 2014 eGolf $250,000 Championship at Red Hawk.

The success of the first series would launch one of the longest-running reality shows on television, and become one of Golf Channel's most watched series.

== Elimination chart ==
Contestant	Ep. 2	Ep. 3	Ep. 4	Ep. 5	Ep. 6	Ep. 7	Ep. 8	Ep. 9	Ep. 10
Mulligan; Winner	Justin	Jon	Mark	Anthony	Craig^{1}	Randy	None	Justin	None
Justin	IN	HIGH	IN	IN	WIN	HIGH	WIN	HIGH	WIN^{2}
Anthony	HIGH	HIGH	IN	IN	HIGH	IN	WIN	HIGH	OUT
Craig	IN	IN	LOW	IN	LOW	LOW	LOW	OUT	
Randy	IN	LOW	HIGH	HIGH	WIN	HIGH	OUT		
Mark	LOW	LOW	IN	LOW	WIN	OUT			
Jeff	IN	LOW	IN	IN	OUT				
Jon	IN	IN	IN	OUT					
Steve	IN	IN	OUT						
Charles	IN	OUT							
Garrett	OUT								

- ^{1} The remaining contestants that didn't win immunity, participated in the mulligan challenge.
- ^{2} Justin won the final match 3 & 1 over Anthony.

Green background and WIN means the contestant won matchplay final and The Big Break.
Blue background and WIN means the contestant won immunity from the elimination challenge.
Light Blue background and HIGH means the contestant had one of the higher scores in the elimination challenge.
White background and IN means the contestant had a good enough score to move onto the next episode during the elimination challenge.
Orange background and LOW means the contestant had one of the lower scores for the elimination challenge.
Red background and OUT means the contestant was eliminated from the competition
