= Cindy Miller =

American professional golfer (born 1956)

Personal information
- Full name: Cynthia Susan (Kessler) Miller
- Nationality: United States
- Born: February 11, 1956 (age 70) Dunkirk, New York, U.S.
- Spouse: Allen Miller

Career
- Sport: Golf
- College: University of Miami
- Status: Professional
- Current tour: Legends Tour
- Former tour: LPGA Tour

Best results in LPGA major championships
- U.S. Women's Open: T57: 1980

Cynthia Susan (Kessler) Miller (born February 11, 1956) is an American professional golfer who played on the LPGA Tour from 1979 to 1981.

== Career ==
Miller was born in Dunkirk, New York.

In addition to a professional golfer, she is also a golf professional, author, motivational speaker, CEO of www.cindymillergolf.com and Tee Shots, which embroiders sports apparel.

Miller was a walk-on member of the Hurricanes golf team at the University of Miami in 1974 and graduated an All-American member of two National Championship teams (1977 and 1978).

Miller qualified for the LPGA Tour in August 1979 and played through the 1981 season. Her best finish was tie for 18th in the 1981 Bent Tree Ladies Classic in Sarasota, Florida. She became a golf instructor after her LPGA Tour career and was named LPGA Teacher of the Year in 2010. She was listed in Golf Digest as a top 50 Women Teacher in America., teaching thousands of people to "hit the ball straight on purpose" for over thirty years.

Miller was a contestant on two series of the Golf Channel's reality show The Big Break: The Big Break III: Ladies Only and The Big Break VII: Reunion.

Miller has published Golf 101 for Executives, currently in its second edition, and is currently working on: The Mulligan, A Second Chance, due out at the end of 2013. She is also creator of The Fairy Golf Mother character and subsequent line of merchandise.

Miller currently competes on the LPGA Legends Tour, and has finished in the top-10 five times. She has been a member of the LPGA for over 30 years.

== Personal life ==
Miller is married to former PGA Tour golfer Allen Miller and is the mother of three children.
