= Sigma Alpha Mu =

American collegiate fraternity

- ΣΑΜ
- Founded: November 26, 1909; 116 years ago The City College of New York
- Type: Social
- Affiliation: NIC
- Status: Active
- Scope: North America
- Motto: "True Manhood. Democracy. Humanity"
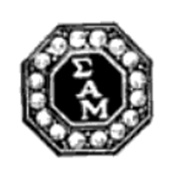
- Member badge
- Colors
- Symbol: Fleur-de-lis and Octagon
- Flag
- Flower: Purple Aster
- Jewel: Pearl
- Publication: The Octagonian
- Philanthropy: Alzheimer's Association
- Chapters: 41 active 152 chartered
- Colonies: 5
- Members: 3,000+ active 67,000+ lifetime
- Nicknames: Sammy, SAM
- Headquarters: 8701 Founders Road; Indianapolis, Indiana 46268; United States
- Website: sam.org

Sigma Alpha Mu (ΣΑΜ), commonly known as Sammy, is a college fraternity founded at the City College of New York in 1909. The fraternity was originally headquartered in New York City, where it was founded. Today, its headquarters are located in Indianapolis, Indiana, along with many other fraternities. Since its inception, Sigma Alpha Mu has initiated more than 67,000 members across 152 chapters in the United States and Canada.

The fraternity was originally founded as an organization for Jewish men prior to dropping its religious affiliation and becoming open to men of all faiths and good moral character in 1953. It is one of three major national/international social fraternities to have been founded at the City College of New York, the others being Delta Sigma Phi and Zeta Beta Tau.

== History ==
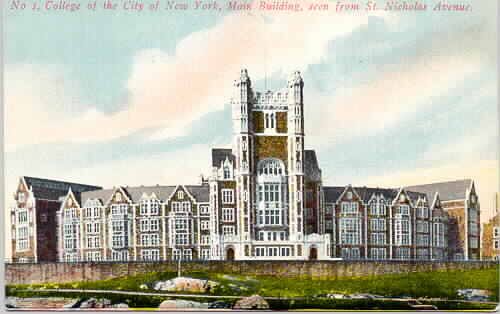
Shepard Hall at the City College of New York, early 1900s

In the fall of 1909, the sophomore class at the College of the City of New York had found itself embarrassed by "lowly freshmen". At a school where "warfare" between freshman and sophomore classes was a tradition, the sophomores found it necessary to regain their fallen honor. Class Marshal Lester Cohen called a meeting of sophomore leaders on November 26, 1909, to decide on a plan for redemption. Its eight founders were Lester Cohen, Adolph I. Fabis, Samuel Ginsburg, Hyman I. Jacobson, Jacob Kaplan, Abram N. Kerner, David D. Levinson, and Ira N. Lind.

During the discussion that took place, much loftier ideals were expressed than the mere formulation of plans for asserting sophomore honor. The men discovered that they held many ideals in common, and the inspiration for the formation of a new fraternity came to them. During this meeting, it was suggested that the Greek letters "Kappa Phi Omega" be used to symbolize the words "Cosmic Fraternal Order" as the new name for the fraternity. This proposal was accepted and the meeting was adjourned.

A second meeting was held a week later. It was found necessary to revise the name of the fraternity because several members had inadvertently made public the chosen name. Ginsburg suggested a motto that was unanimously adopted and which has since remained the fraternity motto. From that time the fraternity was known as Sigma Alpha Mu.

The new fraternity settled down to the accomplishment of the ideals which had promoted its creation. It aimed to prove to the outside world that criticism and objectives leveled against fraternities in general—specious though many of those arguments may have been—did not apply to Sigma Alpha Mu. The founders decided to plan and grow along lines different from those of existing fraternities.

Two years after the founding Sigma Alpha Mu began to grow. To a small group of five at Cornell University, the founders imparted their ideas and inculcated their ideals, and then guided, watched, and aided them-their brothers in far-off Ithaca. Beta chapter patterned its growth as Alpha had and the two chapters, in "the bond of brotherhood, were as one." After this, slowly but surely, Sigma Alpha Mu expanded North, South, East, and West. Sigma Alpha Mu maintains its commitment to growth and attends and assists both the old and new chapters.

The eight founders of Sigma Alpha Mu all came from Jewish backgrounds, and it naturally followed that they were attracted to their brotherhood men of similar backgrounds. They believed in fraternalism among Jewish college men, convinced that without it, a large number of Jewish students would be deprived of the pleasant associations and companionships they now find in most colleges. Sigma Alpha Mu acknowledges its Jewish heritage and the ethical values of Judaism, but with the advent of the mid-twentieth century, expressions of liberalism suggested that constitutional limitations of membership to any particular religious group were not in keeping with the ideal of democracy which had always been part of the fraternity's creed. Thus, responsive to this thinking, Sigma Alpha Mu at its 1953 Convention amended its constitution, making eligible for membership any male student of good moral character who respects the ideals and traditions of the fraternity.

== Mission and creed ==
"Sigma Alpha Mu's Mission is to foster the development of collegiate men and our alumni by instilling strong fraternal values, offering social and service opportunities, encouraging academic excellence, and teaching leadership skills. We will continue to attract members of all beliefs who appreciate our great heritage as a fraternity of Jewish men." Its creed is "To foster and maintain among its sons a spirit of fraternity, a spirit of mutual moral aid and support; to instill and maintain in the hearts of its sons love for and loyalty to Alma Mater and its ideals; to inculcate among its sons such ideals as will result in actions worthy of the highest precepts of true manhood, democracy, and humanity."

== Symbols ==
Sigma Alpha Mu's motto is "True Manhood. Democracy. Humanity". It symbols are the Fleur-de-lis and the Octagon.

Sigma Alpha Mu's badge is octagonal with the Greek letters ΣΑΜ in gold on a black enamel background, surrounded by sixteen pearls. The fraternity's pledge pin is octagonal, with the Greek letter Σ on a purple enamel background.

Sigma Alpha Mu's colors are purple and white. Its flower is the purple aster. Its jewel is the pearl. The fraternity's publication is The Octagonian. Its nicknames are Sammy and SAM.

== Governance ==
Each chapter has a council to take charge and lead the organization which consists of four positions:

- Prior (president): Primarily deals with external affairs such as meeting with presidents of other fraternities, meeting with members of the university, or any other organization’s leaders.
- Vice prior (vice president): Typically deals with internal affairs, and assists the prior with any complicated issues.
- Exchequer (treasurer): Manages financial issues of the house, collects house rent and social dues, and takes care of budgeting for events.
- Recorder (secretary): Documents any pertinent information about the fraternity.

== Activities ==
=== Candidate education ===
Following a school's "rush", or recruitment period, all chapters of Sigma Alpha Mu allow for a Candidate Education (pledge) program where the candidates learn about the fraternity. At the end of the period, these candidates are tested to determine whether or not they have learned about the fraternity and are reliable to carry on the fraternity’s traditions. The basic goal of the pledge program is for the candidates to become more acquainted with the fraternity and more importantly, each other. The candidate process allows each candidate (pledge) to become well known by all active/inactive brothers along with any alumni, as the candidates must be comfortable with not only their candidate class but also the rest of the chapter.

=== Community service ===
Sigma Alpha Mu members, through their chapters, participate in service in the communities in which their respective colleges are located. Bounce for Beats, a national service project, began at Case Institute of Technology's Mu Gamma Chapter in 1965. Scores of chapters bouncing a basketball to symbolize the heartbeat—or now conducting other basketball-related events—have collected hundreds of thousands of dollars for worthy causes including the American Heart Association and Pediatric AIDS Foundation. Since 1995, proceeds from the event have benefited the Elizabeth Glaser Pediatric AIDS Foundation.

In 2005, Sigma Alpha Mu chose the Alzheimer's Association as its service and philanthropy project where they raise donations for Alzheimer's Research. Association board member Marshall Gelfand was instrumental in forging the partnership between the two organizations and received the fraternity's Certificate of Merit in 2005, which is awarded to ΣΑΜ alumni whose service and achievements in community endeavors are worthy of special recognition. Donations raised by the fraternity are part of The Judy Fund, established in 2003 on behalf of Mr. Gelfand's wife who in 1995, was diagnosed with Alzheimer's disease. Mrs. Gelfand died in 2004. Alzheimer's Association's fastest growing individual named fund, The Judy Fund, has raised more than $5.1 million as of December 2014.

== Local chapter or member misconduct ==
On February 8, 2018, the Sigma Beta chapter at Ohio State University was suspended for violations of hazing and alcohol policies. Also in 2018, the fraternity's chapter at Towson University was suspended from campus due to hazing.

On January 22, 2015, national media outlets reported on damage caused by the University of Michigan chapter of Sigma Alpha Mu at Treetops Resort near Gaylord, Michigan. The fraternity was reported to have caused over $430,000 in damages including broken ceiling tiles, furniture and windows. Joshua Kaplan, president of the University of Michigan chapter of Sigma Alpha Mu during the events, stated he was "embarrassed and ashamed of the behavior of some members," and that "our chapter accepts full responsibility for this incident and we will be working with the management of the resort to pay for all damages and cleaning costs." However, according to Treetops Resort officials $25,000 was paid toward the bill, but that the Sigma Alpha Mu organization was "unwilling to accept liability and pay restitution [on behalf of the chapter]." The chapter was subsequently suspended for four years following the events. Three members of the fraternity were criminally charged. University of Michigan President Mark Schlissel entered a four-year ban from campus life. This was "the most severe sanction that can be implemented against any campus student organization." He also asked to national fraternity's council to pull its charter. A lawsuit, claiming that, “the resort says it now believes the vandalism was in retaliation for management confronting the students earlier in the day over payment” and prior damage.

In 2008, a University of Delaware freshman died of alcohol poisoning after attending a party hosted by members of the Sigma Alpha Mu fraternity, where the student was pledging.

== See also ==
- List of Jewish fraternities and sororities
