= Win McMurry =

American sportscaster (born 1983)

Win McMurry (born March 12, 1983) is an American sportscaster. Until October 2013, she anchored Golf Channel's "PGA Tour Primetime" and reported for Golf Central, Morning Drive and other programming features and specials. She is also the host of a series of travel shows on GolfChannel.com titled “Gone With the Win”, and McMurry is also the resident fantasy golf expert, as well as the network's authority on golf fashion.

McMurry previously worked as a producer, writer and host of PGA Tour Entertainment’s PGA Tour Today, Monday Backspin, and Morning Movers on PGATour.com. She has also worked at CBS Sports Network as a golf cart driver for personnel covering the PGA Tour, and a runner for the NFL, and NCAA Basketball, and as a production assistant for WCBS-TV.

== Personal life ==
McMurry was born in Chapel Hill, North Carolina, to Jane Hight McMurry and John E. McMurry, Jr MD, and raised in Wilmington, North Carolina. She is a graduate of University of North Carolina Chapel Hill with a Bachelor of Science in Journalism and Communications Studies and a Post-Graduate Certificate in Business from the Kenan-Flagler School of Business. She also has a sister, Allison Louise McMurry.

McMurry works with many charities, including the Special Olympics, OutFox Cancer, Children’s Miracle Network Hospitals, The First Tee and Junior Champions Foundation.

McMurry was named golf’s "No.1 Beauty" by Sports Illustrated's GOLF Magazine, and crowned "Miss Fantasy Challenge" by Golf Channel. McMurry has received two Telly Awards for her work as a producer, writer, and host of groundbreaking online content for the PGA Tour.
