= Kelly Tilghman =

American golf broadcaster (born 1969)

Kelly Tilghman (born August 6, 1969, North Myrtle Beach, South Carolina) is a former broadcaster for Golf Channel, and NBC Sports, and is the PGA Tour's first female lead golf announcer. On July 29, 2020, it was announced that Tilghman was hired by CBS Sports to host The Clubhouse Report on CBS Sports Network.

Tilghman, who played college golf at Duke University, worked as a course reporter for Golf Channel, after having served as the main play-by-play announcer during its PGA Tour telecasts. She became an anchor in 2007 when the PGA Tour signed a 15-year deal in which Golf Channel broadcasts the first three events of the year, weekday coverage of all tour events, and full coverage of the Fall Series and opposite-field events.

== Early life ==
Tilghman is the daughter of Phil and Kathryn Tilghman of Myrtle Beach, South Carolina.

Her grandfather, Melvin Hemphill, was a golf instructor in the state of South Carolina. Tilghman’s great aunt, Kathryn Hemphill, competed in the 1938 Curtis Cup and won the 1933 Texas Open. All three are members of the South Carolina Golf Hall of Fame.

Tilghman played on the North Myrtle Beach High School boys’ varsity golf team as an 8th grader. She was also a member of the 1986 State Champion North Myrtle Beach high school girls’ basketball team. As an amateur golfer, some of Tilghman’s victories included the 1987 Carolinas Junior Girls Championship and the 1988 Carolinas Golf Association Women’s Four Ball Championship.

She earned a golf scholarship to Duke University. Her lone collegiate title was the 1990 Furman Lady Paladin Invitational.

== Career ==
Kelly Tilghman is currently the host of The Clubhouse Report on CBS Sports Network. She is a former professional golfer and broadcaster for Golf Channel, and NBC Sports. In her 22-year broadcasting career, she was considered one of the most versatile hosts in Golf Channel history and was featured on several of the NBC family of networks most popular platforms like The Today Show, NBC Nightly News, Olympics, U.S. Open, and Ryder Cup golf tournaments.

She became the PGA Tour's first full-time female lead play-by-play announcer for the PGA Tour beginning in 2007 when she partnered with 6-time major champion Nick Faldo.

A former collegiate golfer at Duke University who won the 1990 Furman Lady Paladin Invitational she graduated with a BA in Political Science and History in 1991.

Tilghman was a Touring professional who competed on the European, Asian, and Australian circuits against the likes of Annika Sörenstam and Karrie Webb from 1992-1996.

She was an Olympic host for the Summer Games in London and Rio in 2012 and 2016.

Tilghman is a Co-founder of Gene's Dream Foundation and the Mentor Cup and Dream Challenge golf tournaments in her hometown of North Myrtle Beach, South Carolina. Her charity and its tournaments benefit the local First Tee of Coastal Carolinas, and various other programs that support a positive mentoring experience for area children.

She was the Lead Play by Play Voice of EA Sports Tiger Woods video game in 2009, 2010, and 2011.

Tilghman caddied for Arnold Palmer twice in the Masters Par-3 Tournament as he played alongside Jack Nicklaus and Gary Player. Tilghman was inducted into the North Myrtle Beach High School Athletic Hall of Fame in 2015, the Myrtle Beach Golf Hall of Fame in 2016, and South Carolina Golf Hall of Fame in January 2019. She joined her grandfather Melvin Hempville and great-aunt Kathryn Hemphill, who have been members since 1980, in the honor.

In 2019, she became an ambassador for the Arnold Palmer Invitational at Bay Hill Club and Lodge.

After a 22-year broadcasting career with Golf Channel and NBC Sports, Tilghman retired from the network in March 2018 at the Arnold Palmer Invitational.

On July 29, 2020, it was announced that Tilghman was hired by CBS Sports to host The Clubhouse Report on CBS Sports Network, a live post-game show covering the 102nd PGA Championship at TPC Harding Park in San Francisco, California.

=== Professional career ===
After a brief stint in Scottsdale, Arizona as a PGA Professional at McCormick Ranch Golf Club, Tilghman became a playing professional.

From 1994-1996, Tilghman competed on the Australian, Asian, and European Ladies Golf Tours.

In 1996, Tilghman ended her playing career and turned her focus to television. She was hired at Golf Channel in Orlando, Florida where she began her career as a videotape librarian. She would become a versatile on-air personality, serving as reporter and host to several of the network’s most popular shows.

In 2003, she made her network debut when she conducted interviews for NBC Sports at the U.S. Women’s Open Championship at Pumpkin Ridge Golf Club in North Plains, Oregon.

In 2007, she made history when she became the first full-time female play-by-play announcer in PGA TOUR history after Golf Channel secured a landmark 15-year broadcast rights deal with the PGA TOUR. Tilghman partnered with 6-time major champion Nick Faldo in the booth.

In 2012, Tilghman anchored MSNBC’s daytime coverage of the Olympic Summer Games in London She served as a studio host in Golf Channel’s coverage of golf’s return to the Olympics in Rio de Janeiro in 2016.

In 2018, Tilghman announced her retirement from Golf Channel at the Arnold Palmer Invitational in Orlando, Florida.

In 2019, Tilghman was named an ambassador for the Arnold Palmer Invitational.

On July 29, 2020, after a two and a half year absence from broadcasting, Tilghman was hired by CBS Sports to host The Clubhouse Report on CBS Sports Network, a live post-game show covering the 102nd PGA Championship at TPC Harding Park in San Francisco, California.

=== Philanthropy ===
In 2018, Tilghman created Gene’s Dream Foundation to honor her late mentor, Gene Weldon. Gene’s Dream Foundation is focused on raising funds for mentor-based programs in the Myrtle Beach area. The foundation’s golf tournaments are called the Mentor Cup and the Dream Challenge. They serve as qualifying events for the Liberty Mutual Invitational National Finals.

== Controversy ==
Tilghman drew criticism for remarks about Tiger Woods during a January 4, 2008 PGA Tour Telecast. In response to co-anchor Nick Faldo's joke that younger players should "gang up" on Woods, Tilghman replied, "lynch him in a back alley." Tilghman was laughing during the exchange with Faldo at the Mercedes-Benz Championship, and Woods' agent at IMG was quoted as saying he didn't think there was any ill intent.

The event continued to be covered by the cable news channels, and civil rights activist Al Sharpton demanded she be fired immediately. She apologized two days later for her remarks during the final-round broadcast.

On January 9, it was announced that Golf Channel had suspended Kelly for two weeks as a result of her comment, a reversal of course from the channel's earlier declaration that she would not be suspended.

Before her suspension was announced, Sharpton spoke earlier on CNN's "Prime News" and continued to push for her firing, saying he wanted to meet with Golf Channel because the comment was "an insult to all blacks." On January 15, 2008, Golf Channel re-hired former number one anchor Vince Cellini raising questions as to whether Cellini was brought back in the event Tilghman did not survive the public outcry for her removal.

=== Aftermath ===
In the aftermath of the incident, Golfweek magazine ran a story about the incident, featuring a controversial cover portraying a hanging noose. The choice of imagery was widely criticized, and led to the firing of Golfweek's editor, Dave Seanor.

Since the incident, Kelly has appeared as an announcer on Tiger's Tiger Woods PGA Tour 09, Tiger Woods PGA Tour 10, Tiger Woods PGA Tour 11 video games.
