= Bridget Dwyer =

American golfer (born 1980)

Bridget Dwyer (born September 16, 1980) is an American professional golfer, best known for her appearance on The Big Break, the Golf Channel's reality television series.

Dwyer was born in Oahu, Hawaii, and is the youngest of six children.

== Golf and high school ==
Dwyer started playing golf at the age of 13, when her father took her out to the driving range. She attended Punahou School, a private school in Oahu, Hawaii, where she was a member of the boys golf team, there being no girls team at the time. As well as golf, Dwyer also played soccer. By senior year, she had traveled to the mainland United States, to compete in some American Junior Golf Association tournaments.

== College ==
Dwyer received a partial scholarship to UCLA, where she helped her team go from ranked outside of the top 50 in her freshman year to the NCAA Championship her senior year. She was awarded Most Inspirational Player in her senior year. She graduated in June 2004, with a 3.6 GPA and a major in Economics and minor in Japanese.

== Professional career ==
Dwyer turned professional the following season in 2005. She has played on many tours including the Futures Tour, the Canadian Tour, the Chinese Tour and the West Coast Tour.

== The Big Break VI ==
Dwyer was also featured on The Big Break VI: Trump National, the sixth series of the Golf Channel's reality show. She managed to get through to the final where she competed against Brianna Vega in an 18-hole match play competition. Vega won the final 3 & 1.
