= Reunion, Florida =

Planned community in the United States

Coordinates: 28°16′49″N 81°36′29″W

Reunion is a resort and master-planned community located within Four Corners in Osceola County, Florida, near Walt Disney World Resort. Developed by Bobby Ginn and the Ginn family, owner and developer of several resort communities. Reunion is part of the Orlando–Kissimmee Metropolitan Statistical Area.

== Golf ==
Reunion Resort has three PGA golf courses, each designed by and named for Jack Nicklaus, Tom Watson and Arnold Palmer. The resort hosted the Ginn Open, an LPGA Tour event, from 2006 to 2008.

== Amenities ==
Reunion is situated on 2,226 acres (901 ha) and is a planned Development of Regional Impact (DRI) planned for 6,233 residential dwelling units, 1,574 hotel rooms, 140,000 square feet (13,000 m^{2}) of office space and 484,000 square feet (45,000 m^{2}) of retail space according to the Osceola County Planning Office. The resort presents an upscale vacation community for short-term guests and long-term residents; and includes comprehensive leisure facilities, restaurants, clubhouse and 5 acres (2.0 ha) private water park.

Reunion Resort has a 5 acres (2.0 ha) water park with a winding lazy river, two-story water slide and children's interactive play area. Reunion has a spa, a tennis complex, biking and walking trails as well as a fitness center and fitness programs. Reunion Resort is currently owned and operated by Kingwood International Resorts.

== Accommodation ==
Reunion Resort's portfolio of luxury real estate comprises condominiums and estate homes, both short stay vacation rentals and permanent residences. The Jack Nicklaus-branded Bear's Den Park has two gated subdivisions within the golf community. Phase 2 of the Bear's Den Park is deed restricted as residential only, the first of its kind within Reunion Resort.

== Reunion on TV ==
The Big Break VII: Reunion at Reunion aired on the Golf Channel in 2007 and featured competitors from past seasons competing for PGA and LPGA tour exemptions at Ginn Reunion Resort.

== See also ==
- Celebration, Florida, an adjacent master planned community in Osceola County
- The Reunion Resort Unofficial Blog, Dedicated Unofficial Blog for Reunion Resort's homeowners and members
