= The Big Break II =

- Hosted by: Rick Smith; Lesley Swanson
- Winner: Kip Henley III
- Location: Stallion Mountain Country Club; Bali Hai Golf Club, Las Vegas, Nevada
- No. of episodes: 10

Release
- Original release: September 27, 2004

Season chronology
- ← Previous; The Big Break I Next → The Big Break III: Ladies Only

The Big Break II first aired on September 27, 2004. The majority of the series was filmed at the Stallion Mountain Country Club in Las Vegas, though the matchplay final was held at Vegas' Bali Hai Golf Club. The winner of this edition picked up exemptions into four selected Nationwide Tour events in 2005 (all of which aired on The Golf Channel), a $10,000 cash prize, and a new Ford Five Hundred.

The second season's ten hopefuls were Don Donatello of Lake Mary, Florida; Jay McNair of Brandon, Florida; Kip Henley III of Crossville, Tennessee; Bart Lower of Ann Arbor, Michigan; David Gunas Jr. of Amston, Connecticut; Sean Daly of San Luis Obispo, California; John Turk of Melbourne, Florida; Mike Foster Jr. of Savannah, Georgia; Shelby Chrest of Olds, Alberta; and Scott Yancy III of Glen Carbon, Illinois. Smith returned to host, this time, joined by Lesley Swanson. Henley and Donatello were the final two, and their match needed two extra playoff holes, with Henley eventually winning. Lower also received a prize. A viewer poll determined that of the eight previously eliminated contestants, Lower deserved another chance at his "big break," and with 37% of the vote, more than anyone else, Lower was invited to take part in The Big Break IV, which he accepted. Henley notes in this diary entry that he has gained further awards since his victory. On April 27, 2005, Henley qualified for the PGA Tour's FedEx St. Jude Classic, and qualified for it again in 2011 by winning a local PGA qualifier.

== Elimination chart ==
Contestant	Ep. 1	Ep. 2	Ep. 3	Ep. 4	Ep. 5	Ep. 6^{1}	Ep. 7	Ep. 8	Ep. 9	Ep .10
Mulligan; Winner	None	Sean	Don	Mike	Sean	Kip	David	John	Bart	None
Kip	IN	IN	IN	WIN	WIN	LOW	HIGH	LOW	LOW	WIN^{2}
Don	IN	IN	IN	WIN	IN	IN	LOW	HIGH	WIN	OUT
Bart	WIN	IN	WIN	WIN	IN	IN	WIN	WIN	OUT	
John	IN	IN	IN	IN	IN	IN	HIGH	OUT		
David	IN	LOW	IN	WIN	LOW	IN	OUT			
Mike	LOW	WIN	IN	HIGH	IN	OUT				
Sean	IN	IN	HIGH	LOW	OUT					
Scott	IN	IN	LOW	OUT						
Shelby	IN	IN	OUT							
Jay	IN	OUT								

- ^{1} For this immunity challenge, the six contestants were divided into two teams of three. They played stroke play against three former "Big Break" contestants. The former "Big Break" contestants won, therefore nobody won immunity.
- ^{2} Kip defeated Don in the final match, 20 holes.

Green background and WIN means the contestant won matchplay final and The Big Break.
Blue background and WIN means the contestant won immunity from the mulligan & elimination challenge.
Light blue background and HIGH means the contestant had a higher score in the elimination challenge.
White background and IN means the contestant had a good enough score to move onto the next episode during the elimination challenge.
Orange background and LOW means the contestant had one of the lower scores for the elimination challenge.
Red background and OUT means the contestant was eliminated from the competition
