= Temarrick Hemingway =

American football player (born 1993)

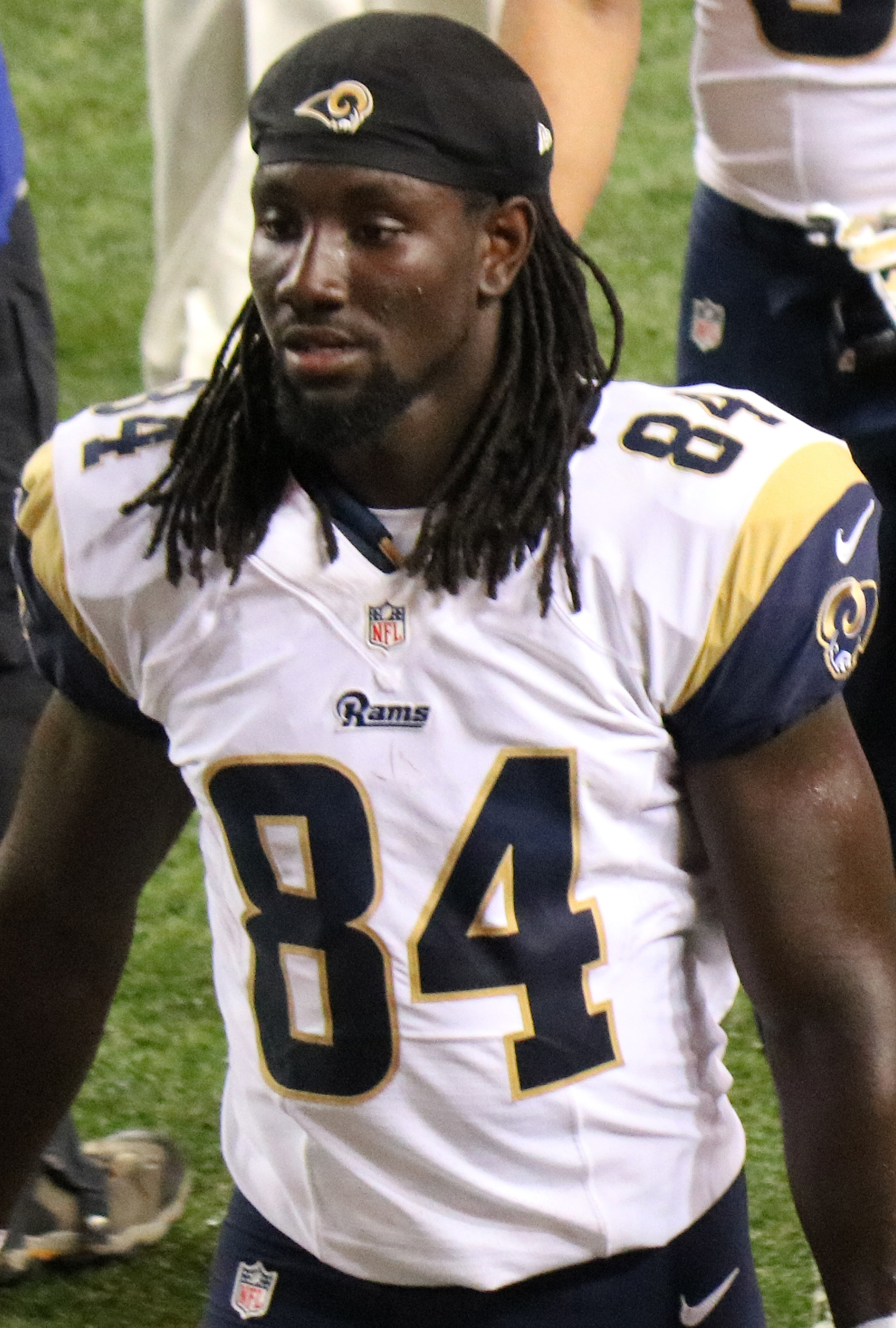
- Hemingway with the Los Angeles Rams in 2016

No. 84, 85, 88
- Position: Tight end

Personal information
- Born: July 30, 1993 (age 33); Longs, South Carolina, U.S.
- Listed height: 6 ft 5 in (1.96 m)
- Listed weight: 245 lb (111 kg)

Career information
- High school: North Myrtle Beach (Little River, South Carolina)
- College: South Carolina State (2011–2015)
- NFL draft: 2016: 6th round, 177th overall pick

Career history
- Los Angeles Rams (2016–2018); Denver Broncos (2018); Carolina Panthers (2019–2020)*; Washington Football Team (2020–2021)
- * Offseason or practice squad member only

Career NFL statistics
- Receptions: 1
- Receiving yards: 10
- Stats at Pro Football Reference

Temarrick Hemingway (born July 30, 1993) is an American former professional football player who was a tight end in the National Football League (NFL). He played college football for the South Carolina State Bulldogs and was selected by the Los Angeles Rams in the sixth round of the 2016 NFL draft.

== College career ==
Hemingway played college football for South Carolina State.

== Professional career ==
=== Los Angeles Rams ===
Hemingway was selected by the Los Angeles Rams in the sixth round with the 177th overall selection in the 2016 NFL draft.

In 2017, Hemingway suffered a fractured fibula in the Rams' third preseason game and was ruled out for several weeks. He was placed on injured reserve on September 2, 2017.

On September 1, 2018, Hemingway was waived by the Rams and was re-signed to the practice squad the next day. He was released by Los Angeles on September 18.

=== Denver Broncos ===
On October 2, 2018, Hemingway was signed to the Denver Broncos' practice squad. He was promoted to the active roster on November 27.

On May 13, 2019, Hemingway was waived by the Broncos.

=== Carolina Panthers ===
On May 14, 2019, Hemingway was claimed off waivers by the Carolina Panthers. He was waived during final roster cuts on August 31, and was re-signed to the practice squad the following day. Hemingway signed a reserve/future contract with the Panthers on December 30.

On September 5, 2020, Hemingway was released by the Panthers.

=== Washington Football Team ===
On September 17, 2020, Hemingway signed with the Washington Football Team's practice squad. He was elevated to the active roster on October 10 and 17 for the team's Weeks 5 and 6 games against the Los Angeles Rams and New York Giants, and reverted to the practice squad following each game. Hemingway was promoted to the active roster on October 22. Hemingway was placed on injured reserve on December 9.

Hemingway was released by Washington on August 26, 2021, as a part of final roster cuts. Hemingway re-signed with the team's practice squad on November 16.
