= Tylenol Par-3 Shootout =

American golf event (1999–2006)

The Tylenol Par-3 Shootout was a skins game golf event that was played annually from 1999 to 2006. It was played on the par-3 Threetops course at the Treetops Resort near Gaylord, Michigan, U.S.

In 2001 Lee Trevino earned a bonus of $1,000,000 by making a hole-in-one at the seventh hole on the first day.

== Winners ==
Year	Winner	Skins ($)	Runner(s)-up	Skins ($)	Third	Skins ($)	Fourth	Skins ($)
Tylenol Par-3 Shootout
1999	Lee Janzen	260,000	Phil Mickelson	230,000	Jack Nicklaus	40,000	Raymond Floyd	10,000
2000	Raymond Floyd	320,000	Phil Mickelson	120,000	Lee Janzen	60,000	Hale Irwin	30,000
2001	Lee Trevino	1,080,000	Phil Mickelson	280,000	Paul Azinger	60,000	Raymond Floyd	30,000
2002	Fred Couples	410,000	Phil Mickelson	60,000	Lee Trevino	50,000	Arnold Palmer	20,000
2003	Fuzzy Zoeller	330,000	(T2) Fred Couples, Lee Trevino			90,000	Phil Mickelson	30,000
2004	Fred Couples	270,000	(T2) Phil Mickelson, Lee Trevino			130,000	Fuzzy Zoeller	10,000
ING Par-3 Shootout
2005	Andy North	350,000	Gary McCord	90,000	(T3) Fred Couples, Phil Mickelson			50,000
2006	Fred Couples	300,000	(T2) Chris DiMarco, Craig Stadler			110,000	Andy North	20,000

Note: All players listed were Americans.
