= North Myrtle Beach High School =

Location
- 3750 Sea Mountain Highway; Little River, South Carolina 29566; United States; 33°51′46″N 78°40′05″W

Information
- Type: Public high school
- Established: 1970 (56 years ago)
- School district: Horry County Schools
- Superintendent: Rick Maxey
- CEEB code: 411532
- Principal: Ansley Morrow
- Teaching staff: 93.00 (FTE)
- Grades: 9–12
- Enrollment: 1,654 (2023-2024)
- Student to teacher ratio: 17.78
- Colors: Blue and gold
- Mascot: Chiefs
- Feeder schools: North Myrtle Beach Middle School (6–8); Ocean Drive Elementary School (K–5); Waterway Elementary School (K–5); Riverside Elementary School (K–5)
- Website: www.horrycountyschools.net/nmbh

North Myrtle Beach High School is a public school located in Little River, South Carolina. The school is one of nine high schools within Horry County Schools. The school serves the city of North Myrtle Beach, the town of Atlantic Beach, and the communities of Little River and Longs.

== History ==
Following integration, North Myrtle Beach High School was created out of Wampee-Little River High School (the white school) and Chestnut High School (the black school). These two schools covered an attendance zone including Atlantic Beach, Little River, Longs, and the newly incorporated North Myrtle Beach. The school mascot, the "Chiefs", and the school colors were voted on by a committee consisting of one member from each of the six grades of the original two schools. The previous mascots were the "Indians" (Wampee), and the "Braves" (Chestnut). The school's colors of blue and gold are a combination of Wampee High School's blue and white, and Chestnut High School's maroon and gold.

== Sports ==
North Myrtle Beach High School Arrowhead Sports Logo

North Myrtle Beach High School offers the following sports: baseball, basketball, cheerleading, cross country, football, golf, lacrosse, soccer, softball, swimming, tennis, track and field, volleyball, and wrestling.

The school's teams compete in South Carolina Region 6-4A sports with Myrtle Beach High School, Marlboro County High School, Hartsville High School, Darlington High School, and Wilson High School.

The school's won the region football championship in 2006, 2016, 2017, and 2020. The 2017 team had the best record in school history with a 12–1 season.

The school’s volleyball team won the SCHSL State Championship in 2012, 2018, 2019, & 2024 and were the state runner-ups in 2013, 2022, & 2023.

== Notable alumni ==
- Alyssa Arce – fashion model, Playboy Playmate for July 2013
- Scott Bessent – 79th United States Secretary of the Treasury (2025-Present)
- Temarrick Hemingway – Second player in school history to reach the NFL.
- Ryan Quigley – Played at Boston College and is a retired NFL punter
- Kelly Tilghman – Broadcaster for The Golf Channel, and the PGA Tour's first female lead golf announcer
- Vanna White – Television personality known for co-hosting Wheel of Fortune. (Class of 1975)
