= Ryan Quigley =

American football player (born 1990)

No. 1, 4, 9
- Position: Punter

Personal information
- Born: January 26, 1990 (age 36); Little River, South Carolina, U.S.
- Listed height: 6 ft 2 in (1.88 m)
- Listed weight: 205 lb (93 kg)

Career information
- High school: North Myrtle Beach (Little River)
- College: Boston College
- NFL draft: 2012: undrafted

Career history
- Chicago Bears (2012); New York Jets (2013–2015); Philadelphia Eagles (2016)*; Jacksonville Jaguars (2016)*; Arizona Cardinals (2016); Minnesota Vikings (2017)
- * Offseason or practice squad member only

Career NFL statistics
- Punts: 330
- Punting yards: 14,555
- Average: 44.1
- Inside 20: 113
- Stats at Pro Football Reference

Ryan A. Quigley (born January 26, 1990) is an American former professional football player who was a punter in the National Football League (NFL). He played college football for the Boston College Eagles and was signed by the Chicago Bears after going undrafted in the 2012 NFL draft.

He was also a member of the New York Jets, Philadelphia Eagles, Jacksonville Jaguars, Arizona Cardinals, and Minnesota Vikings.

== Early life ==
Quigley attended North Myrtle Beach High School, where he played for the football team. In his senior year, Quigley led the state of South Carolina in yards per punt with 46. He also played kicker, and made six of eight field goals, and kicked 93 percent of his kickoffs for touchbacks. He was later named first-team All-State by the Associated Press along with being named the South Carolina Special Teams Player of the Year.

== College career ==
Quigley attended Boston College. As a freshman in 2008, he finished with 59 punts for 2,334 net yards for a 39.6 average. In 2009, Quigley broke the school record for the most punts in a season with 77, and he would later break the record a year later with 79. Overall, in the 2009 season, he finished with 77 punts for 3,145 net yards for a 40.8 average. As a junior in 2010, he finished with 79 punts for 3,282 net yards for a 41.5 average. In his senior year, he was ranked fourth in the nation for punts inside the 20-yard line with 28. Overall, in the 2011 season, he finished with 69 punts for 2,657 net yards for a 38.5 average. He is the school's all-time leader in career punts with 283 punts for 11,418 yards.

== Professional career ==
Pre-draft measurables
Height	Weight	40-yard dash	10-yard split	20-yard split	Vertical jump	Bench press
6 ft 1 5/8 in (1.87 m)	195 lb (88 kg)	5.23 s	1.81 s	3.03 s	27 in (0.69 m)	10 reps
All values from Boston College Pro Day

=== Chicago Bears ===
Quigley was signed by the Chicago Bears after the draft. He replaced Adam Podlesh at punter for the preseason after Podlesh sustained a hip flexor injury against the Washington Redskins in the second preseason game. Against the New York Giants in the third preseason game, he had three of his seven punts land inside the 20-yard line, and the Giants were only able to muster six yards on four returns. However, Quigley also had a punt blocked to set up a Giants touchdown, though the Bears would go on to win 20–17. He later made the 53-man roster. However, Podlesh ended up punting in the season opener against the Indianapolis Colts. Quigley was waived by the Bears on September 10.

=== New York Jets ===
On April 11, 2013, Quigley signed with the New York Jets. He was released by the Jets on August 26. Quigley was re-signed on September 16, after the Jets released Robert Malone. On September 22, Quigley made his NFL debut against the Buffalo Bills. He finished the game with seven punts for 294 net yards for a 42.00 average. Overall, in the regular season, Quigley finished with 72 punts for 3,278 net yards for a 45.5 average.

In the 2014 season, Quigley finished with 78 punts for 3,580 net yards for a 45.9 average.

In Week 9 of the 2015 season, Quigley was named the AFC Special Team's Player of the Week against the Jacksonville Jaguars. Filling in as placekicker after Nick Folk suffered a season-ending injury in pregame warmups, he made all four extra points in addition to placing five punts inside the 20. Overall, in the 2015 season, he finished with 75 punts for 3,287 net yards for a 43.8 average.

=== Philadelphia Eagles ===
Quigley signed with the Philadelphia Eagles on April 18, 2016. Quigley was released by the team on May 23.

=== Jacksonville Jaguars ===
On June 16, 2016, Quigley was signed by the Jacksonville Jaguars. On August 29, he was waived by the Jaguars.

=== Arizona Cardinals ===
On September 28, 2016, Quigley was signed by the Arizona Cardinals. On November 15, he was released by the Cardinals. In his time with the Cardinals in the 2016 season, Quigley had 34 punts for 1,416 net yards for a 41.6 average.

=== Minnesota Vikings ===
On April 3, 2017, Quigley signed with the Minnesota Vikings. Overall, in the 2017 season, he finished with 71 punts for 2,994 net yards for a 42.2 average.

On September 2, 2018, Quigley was released by the Vikings prior to the start of the season after the team acquired Matt Wile.

== NFL career statistics ==
Legend
	Led the league
**Bold**	Career high

=== Regular season ===
Year	Team	Punting									
Year	Team	GP	Punts	Yds	Net Yds	Lng	Avg	Net Avg	Blk	Ins20	TB
2013	NYJ	14	72	3,278	2,837	67	45.5	39.4	0	21	3
2014	NYJ	**16**	**78**	**3,580**	**3,150**	**69**	**45.9**	**39.9**	**1**	23	**9**
2015	NYJ	15	75	3,287	2,775	68	43.8	36.5	**1**	27	4
2016	ARI	6	34	1,416	1,301	55	41.6	37.2	**1**	13	2
2017	MIN	**16**	71	2,994	2,781	56	42.2	39.2	0	**29**	0
Career		67	330	14,555	12,844	69	44.1	38.6	3	113	18

=== Playoffs ===
Year	Team	Punting									
Year	Team	GP	Punts	Yds	Net Yds	Lng	Avg	Net Avg	Blk	Ins20	TB
2017	MIN	**2**	**7**	**272**	**221**	**53**	**38.9**	**31.6**	0	**2**	0
Career		2	7	272	221	53	38.9	31.6	0	2	0
