= Ginn Open =

Women's professional golf tournament

Tournament information
- Location: Reunion, Florida
- Established: 2006
- Course: Ginn Reunion Resort
- Par: 72
- Length: 6,505 yards (5,948 m)
- Tour: LPGA Tour
- Format: Stroke play - 72 holes
- Prize fund: $2,600,000
- Month played: April
- Final year: 2008

Tournament record score
- Aggregate: 269 - Lorena Ochoa (2008)
- To par: -19 - Lorena Ochoa (2008)

Final champion
- (Mexico) Lorena Ochoa

The Ginn Open was a women's professional golf tournament on the LPGA Tour. It was played from 2006 to 2008 at Ginn Reunion Resort in Reunion, Florida. For all three years, the tournament was broadcast on CBS Sports.The title sponsor was Ginn Resorts, a resort development and management firm with headquarters in Celebration, Florida. With a purse exceeding $2 million, the tournament winner automatically qualified for the season-ending ADT Championship.

The tournament used the front nine of the Legacy Course designed by Arnold Palmer and the front nine of the Independence Course designed by Tom Watson.

== Tournament names ==
- 2006 Ginn Clubs & Resorts Open
- 2007-2008 Ginn Open

== History ==
=== Inaugural tournament ===
The 2006 inaugural Ginn Open tournament, was the most expensive LPGA inaugural tournament to date. The purse was the 3rd largest in the LPGA. In addition, the tournament weekend featured concerts by Brooks & Dunn.

=== Winners ===
Year	Date	Champion	Country	Winning score	To par	Margin of victory	Runner(s)-up	Purse ($)	Winner's share ($)
2008	Apr 20	Lorena Ochoa	Mexico	68-67-65-69=269	−19	3 strokes	(Taiwan) Yani Tseng	2,600,000	390,000
2007	Apr 15	Brittany Lincicome	United States	67-72-67-72=278	−10	1 stroke	(Mexico) Lorena Ochoa	2,600,000	390,000
2006	Apr 30	Mi-Hyun Kim	South Korea	70-66-69-71=276	−12	2 strokes	(Mexico) Lorena Ochoa (Australia) Karrie Webb	2,500,000	375,000

The tournament record was set in 2008 by Yani Tseng.

Year	Player	Score	Round
2008	Yani Tseng	64 (−8)	2nd round

== Ending ==
It was announced on January 28, 2009, that Ginn was ending all golf tournament sponsorships due to the economy. As a result, the tournament was cancelled for 2009, and no substitute tournament was announced. The LPGA sued Ginn for breach of contract due to the cancellation.
