= Tim Rosaforte =

American golf journalist (1955–2022)

Tim Rosaforte (October 25, 1955 – January 11, 2022) was an American golf journalist. He wrote for the Tampa Times, South Florida Sun-Sentinel, Palm Beach Post, Sports Illustrated, and Golf Digest. He also worked in broadcasting with USA Network and Golf Channel.

== Career ==
Rosaforte grew up in Mount Kisco, New York. Rosaforte attended the University of Rhode Island for college. He was a linebacker on the football team and earned a degree in journalism.

He began his career with the Tampa Times in 1977. He later worked for South Florida Sun-Sentinel and Palm Beach Post, newspapers both in Florida. Shortly thereafter, he started writing for magazines like Sports Illustrated, Golf World, and Golf Digest. According to the PGA Tour, however, "it was in television that he found his niche, providing insights in real time at golf's biggest events."

== Death ==
Rosaforte died from complications of Alzheimer's disease on January 11, 2022, at the age of 66.
