= Allen Miller (golfer) =

American professional golfer (born 1948)

Personal information
- Full name: Allen Lane Miller III
- Nationality: United States
- Born: August 10, 1948 (age 78) San Diego, California, U.S.
- Height: 5 ft 10 in (1.78 m)
- Weight: 175 lb (79 kg; 12.5 st)
- Spouse: Cindy Miller

Career
- Sport: Golf
- Turned professional: 1971
- Former tour: PGA Tour
- Professional wins: 1

Number of wins by tour
- PGA Tour: 1

Best results in major championships
- Masters Tournament: T15: 1975
- PGA Championship: T39: 1984
- U.S. Open: CUT: 1974
- The Open Championship: DNP

Allen Lane Miller III (born August 10, 1948) is an American professional golfer who played on the PGA Tour in the 1970s and 1980s.

== Early life and amateur career ==
In 1948, Miller was born in San Diego, California.

Miller had a distinguished amateur career. He attended the University of Georgia, and was a member of the golf team. Miller was the #2 ranked amateur in America in 1969 and 1970 by Golf Digest; he was a member of the 1969 and 1971 Walker Cup teams, and the 1970 Eisenhower Trophy team. Miller won the 1970 Canadian Amateur Championship as well.

== Professional career ==
In 1971, Miller turned professional. He played on the PGA Tour for 15 years and had 18 top-10 finishes. He won the 1974 Tallahassee Open by one stroke over Joe Inman, Eddie Pearce and Dan Sikes with a 14-under-par 274. The event was played during the same week as the Tournament of Champions, where most of the Tours elite players played. His best finish in a major was T-15 at The Masters in 1975.

Since retiring from the Tour in 1986, Miller has earned a living primarily as a teaching professional. He also played in a limited number of Senior PGA Tour events; his best finish on this circuit is a T-45 at the 1998 First of America Classic. Miller and his wife Cindy, who is also a golf teaching professional and a former LPGA Tour player, live in western New York. They teach at Airport Driving Range and Paddock Chevrolet Golf Dome in Buffalo.

== Personal life ==
Miller is married to former LPGA Tour golfer Cindy Miller. They have three children.

== Amateur wins ==
- 1969 Trans-Mississippi Amateur
- 1970 Dogwood Invitational, Northeast Amateur, Canadian Amateur Championship, Trans-Mississippi Amateur
- 1971 Trans-Mississippi Amateur

== Professional wins (1) ==
=== PGA Tour wins (1) ===
No.	Date	Tournament	Winning score	Margin of victory	Runners-up
1	Apr 28, 1974	Tallahassee Open	−14 (65-69-67-73=274)	1 stroke	(United States) Joe Inman, (United States) Eddie Pearce, (United States) Dan Sikes

== Results in major championships ==
Tournament	1969	1970	1971	1972	1973	1974	1975	1976	1977	1978	1979
Masters Tournament	CUT	CUT	T42				T15	CUT			
U.S. Open						CUT					
PGA Championship					T64	77					

Tournament	1980	1981	1982	1983	1984
Masters Tournament					
U.S. Open					
PGA Championship	CUT			T82	T39

Note: Miller never played in The Open Championship

Did not play

CUT = missed the half-way cut
"T" = tied

== U.S. national team appearances ==
Amateur

- Walker Cup: 1969 (winners), 1971
- Eisenhower Trophy: 1970 (winners)

== See also ==
- 1971 PGA Tour Qualifying School graduates
