= Screen sports =

Product combining information technology with sports

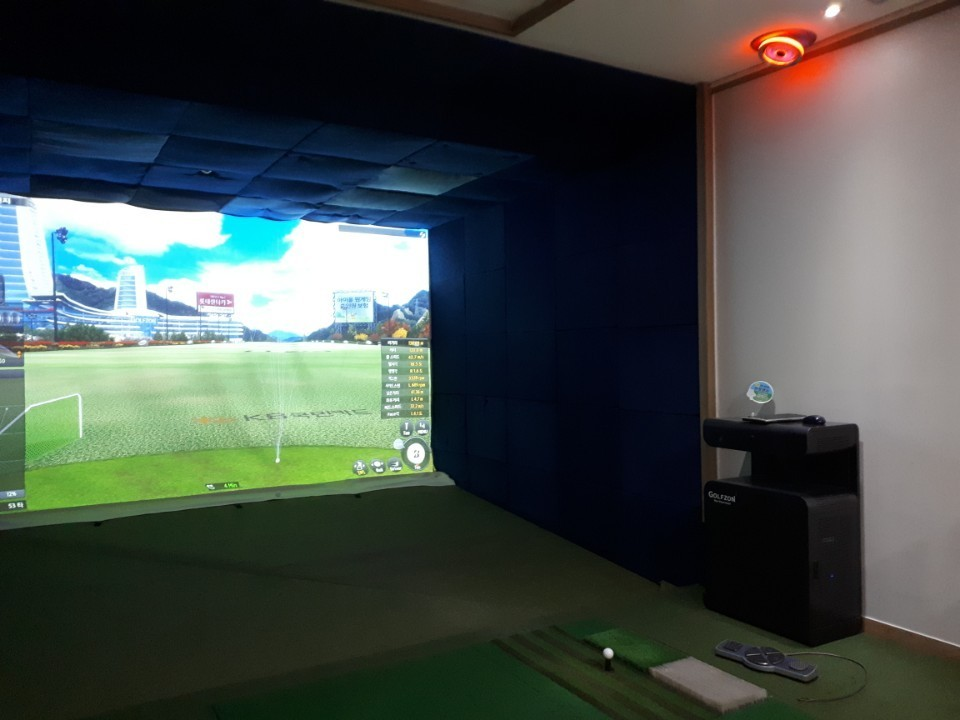
Example of screen sports, showing golf

Screen sports is an experience product that combines information technology (IT) and sports.

Screen sports is expanding its application range by combining IT with the simulation industry. Virtual reality (VR) technology has developed dramatically and 'screen sports' has gained popularity, and people's hobbies are also changing. The advantage with screen sports is that you can enjoy sports without restriction of space, equipment, seasons and weather.

Screen sports gained significant popularity in South Korea. Screen golf is the most popular type of screen sport, available in numerous venues, but other activities are available as well, from skiing, fishing, climbing, tennis to horseback riding.

Screen sport experience can include virtual reality elements.

== Emergence ==
South Korea was one of the first places where screen sports gained popularity. The first screen sport in Korea was golf. Screen Golf is the starting point for the machines brought in for practice in the US in the 1990s. In 1992, "Kaywon Trading Company" held the 'Party Golf Tournament', which is the first in Korea to enjoy indoor golf. In addition, in the same year, April 10 to 11 in the United States in Utah, South Korea, the Korean national delegation, Hong Dong-Hwan won 118 points and won the third place.

== Status ==
In 2013, Ministry of Culture, Sports and Tourism sponsored the 'Sports Industry Mid- to Long-term Development Plan' based on the contents of expanding the industrial scale by combining cutting-edge IT and science technology with domestic sports industry for the next five years until 2018. At this time, the IT industry and science technology were combined with the sports industry, and the screen sports market spread to Korea.

Currently, the most representative screen sport is the one with the market size of 1.77 trillion won as of 2015. There are over 8000 screen golf courses nationwide. The screen golf business in Korea has been attracting attention not only in Korea but also in the resorts of the world and the wealthy people of the Middle East. According to the Korea Golf Association, the number of golfers who play golf on a screen golf course at least once a year is about 6.2 million. Major users have also expanded from the middle-aged to the younger ones in their 20s and 30s, becoming a living sport. By 2016, the total number of strokes has exceeded 30,000, and more than 55 million golfers annually enjoy screen golf.

The main sporting event for screen sports in Korea is golf, which is a baseball game with 7 million spectators in 2015. Computer simulation allows us to enjoy the realism of the actual baseball game. In 2014, the screen baseball industry is showing steep growth. The number of companies has increased from one to 20 in three years. The number of stores that were only three places increased to 350 in the nation. Recently, the number of job seekers who are looking for a screen baseball field rather than a drinking place is increasing because of being spotlighted as a restaurant place for Korean workers.

== Type ==
=== Screen archery ===
Pull the actual archery bow to the screen with the same rules as the existing archery to match the target on the screen. Unlike the actual arch bow, the arrow has a hydraulic cylinder. When you shoot an arrow at a target, the arrow moves slowly through the hydraulic cylinder and moves only to the outside of the bow without reaching the target. It can measure the exact score by analyzing the slope and tension of the bow accurately, although it is not put in the bull's-eye where the score line is drawn. Measuring the tension at the time of pulling and releasing the current, measuring the launching speed of the bow, calculating the position of the flying trajectory and the position using the infrared ray beam attached to the infrared sensor row of the screen and the bow.

=== Screen baseball ===
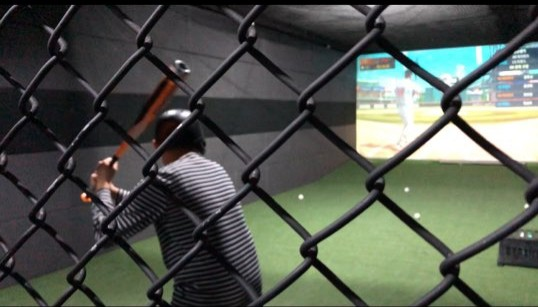
Screen baseball

Baseball has become the next sport to capture fan attention following golf. Supported by an offline infrastructure of 20,000 baseball clubs and 7 million professional baseball spectators, the sport's popularity has led to the opening of over 100 screen baseball facilities nationwide within two years of launch.

The secret of popularity is the 'realism' which is very similar to the actual game. Just like a baseball stadium, people have to actually hit the ball at a speed of about 100 kilometers per hour on a mound of 18 meters. Due to ball catching technology, it accurately distinguishes whether the ball hit by the batter is a foul, hitting, grounding, or home run. The laser sensor is equipped with ultra precision technology that detects up to one millionth of a second, It accurately identifies the strike.

Participants such as family members, lovers, and relatives are allowed to decide as they can, and the game can be divided into three, six, and nine innings. It takes about an hour to complete the game before 9 innings, and the fee is less than 50,000 won. As the word of mouth spreads, it is becoming popular enough to be similar to the early days of screen golf.

=== Screen bowling ===
It also developed a sensing technology (algorithm) and applied a lift system that is suitable for rain. Due to this, it has made the most sense of bowling possible. When a user enters a rail, a computer graphic appears on the front screen with a bowling rail and a bowling pin. As soon as a bowling ball is released from the hand, a bowling ball appears on the screen and analyzes the movement of the ball with a sensor to determine a strike. It is an attractive sport for people of all ages to enjoy together. Screen bowling plans to develop more service programs in the future.

=== Screen fishing ===
One of the most popular hobbies is fishing. People can easily enjoy fishing in the city center without having to go to the sea with expensive fishing equipment. VR technology has created the world's first screen fishing area, 'fishing Joy'. The Tongyeong Yokzi Island and Mara-do offshore, which were photographed by drone, were realistically realized on the screen and sounded like they were on a sea fishing spot by putting sound on the screen, making it popular for fishing-like guests.

=== Screen golf ===
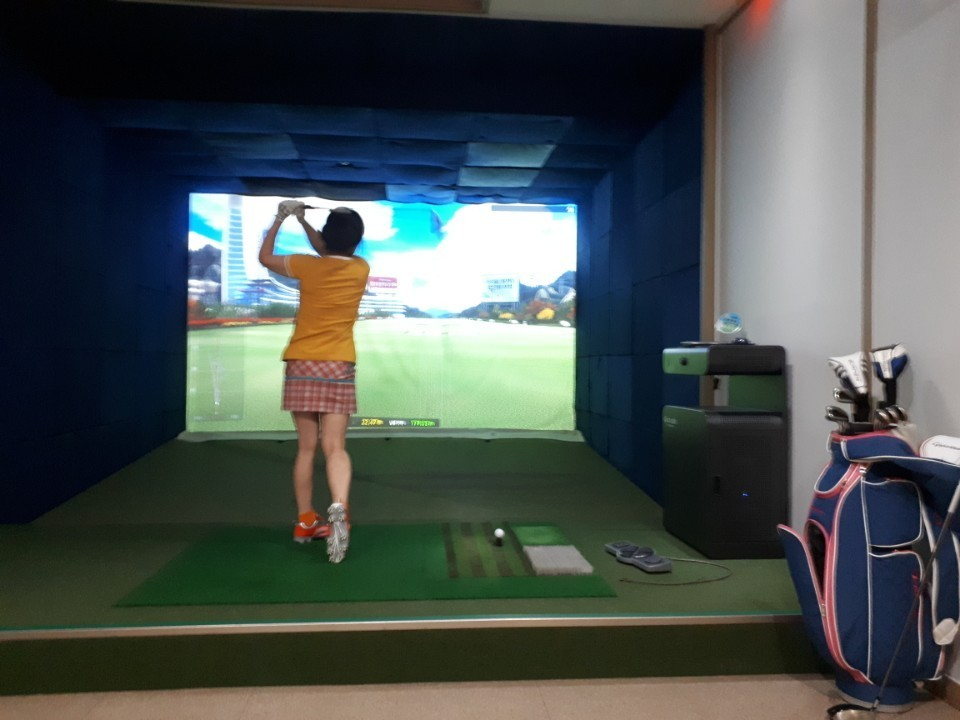
Screen golf

At the beginning of screen golf, there was a lot of concern about the popularity of the game. However, it showed explosive growth at the same time. In addition, the domestic screen golf market has grown steadily, exceeding 140 billion won in 2015. In terms of market size, the total number of screen golf strokes exceeded 30,000 by 2016, and more than 55 million golfers a year enjoy screen golf. According to the Korea Golf Census, published by Screen Golf Golfzon and research firm Macromill Embrain, it is estimated that the number of screen golfers in 2018 will be 3.51 million. With the continuous spread of screen golf, the golf population has been growing at a relatively low level of household income. Golfers with an average monthly household income of 3 million won accounted for 16.8 percent, up 4.4 percentage points from the previous survey, and golfers with 2 million won increased by 1.7 percentage points to 8.5 percent. 29% of all golfers are less than 4 million won in household income. On the other hand, household income of more than 6 million won and golfers of 4 million won decreased by 4 percentage points respectively.

=== Screen shooting ===
Screen shooting ranges with VR technology are seen as an alternative to the beauty of shooting in Korea, where gun and ammunition are strictly managed. The design of guns in the area is a type of air rifle that is almost identical to the actual model. It weighs about the same and can feel a sense of gunfire similar to actual reactions through the air injection method. If you pull the trigger, the laser will set the target on the screen. It is the same way as a game in a game room. The method can choose between hunting and shooting. If you want to hunt, you can choose different maps depending on the level of difficulty. Shooting can also be selected from the genre of target shot and clay shot. People find the fun of shooting from stressful shots and the sense of achievement they feel when they hit a target.

=== Screen soccer ===
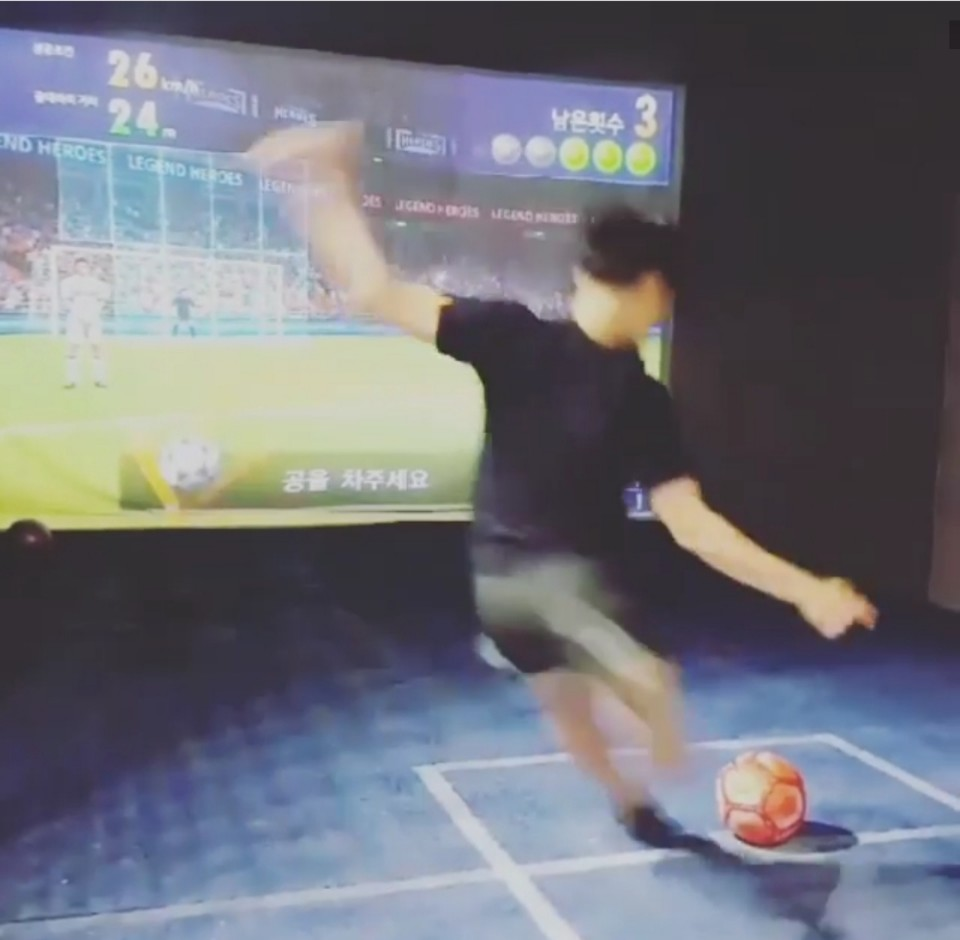
Screen soccer

The screen soccer does not have such a burden because it confronts the designated opponent one to one. In the game mode, when you put a soccer ball on a designated mark, you will get a count of kicking the ball. If the player makes a strong effort toward the goal in the screen, the success or failure of the shoot is displayed. Soccer ball speed, success rate, score, rankings (ranking) data, such as data can be counted on the screen can be measured. It is possible not only to attack but also to defend. The defender sets the goalkeeper's movements on the outside machine. Then, the opponent predicts the direction in which the ball is kicked and sets the direction so that the goalkeeper can move. The game progresses with alternating defense and offense, and the person who puts more goals in the set number of times wins. Although it is a screen-based game, you can enjoy the sporting game as if you are playing in a real stadium.

=== Others ===
The three winter sports sleighs (luge, skeleton, and bobsleigh), which were not popular, are likely to come out as screen sleds. Already, a device has been developed that doubles the fun and effects of exercise through sensor stimulation of an exercise jacket that is applied directly to the body. Imagine a single capsule with a simulation course inserted. It is established and feels the intensity of exercise throughout the body. Experience-type equipment that requires significant speed, weight and balance can be a combination of games and fitness products.

== Outlook ==
As screen sports become popular as entertainment, it is predicted that a screen sports competition will take place. A South Korean screen baseball game company, "Baseball Kingdom together (다함께 야구왕)" has signed an agreement with the Korea Professional Baseball Players Association. In January 2018, the company held a screen baseball competition for Korean professional baseball players and the public.
