= Katherine Roberts (television personality) =

Katherine Roberts is a golf fitness instructor to the pros. She made her TV debut with Rick Smith, famous swing coach of PGA touring pro Phil Mickelson on the reality series The Big Break, as a co-host for Season 1 of the show.

Roberts has worked with various tour professionals: Davis Love III, David Duval, Ricky Barnes, Chad Campbell, Kenny Perry, and Fred Couples. Roberts is an ESPN School of Golf associate.
