= Treetops Resort =

Golf resort in Michigan, United States

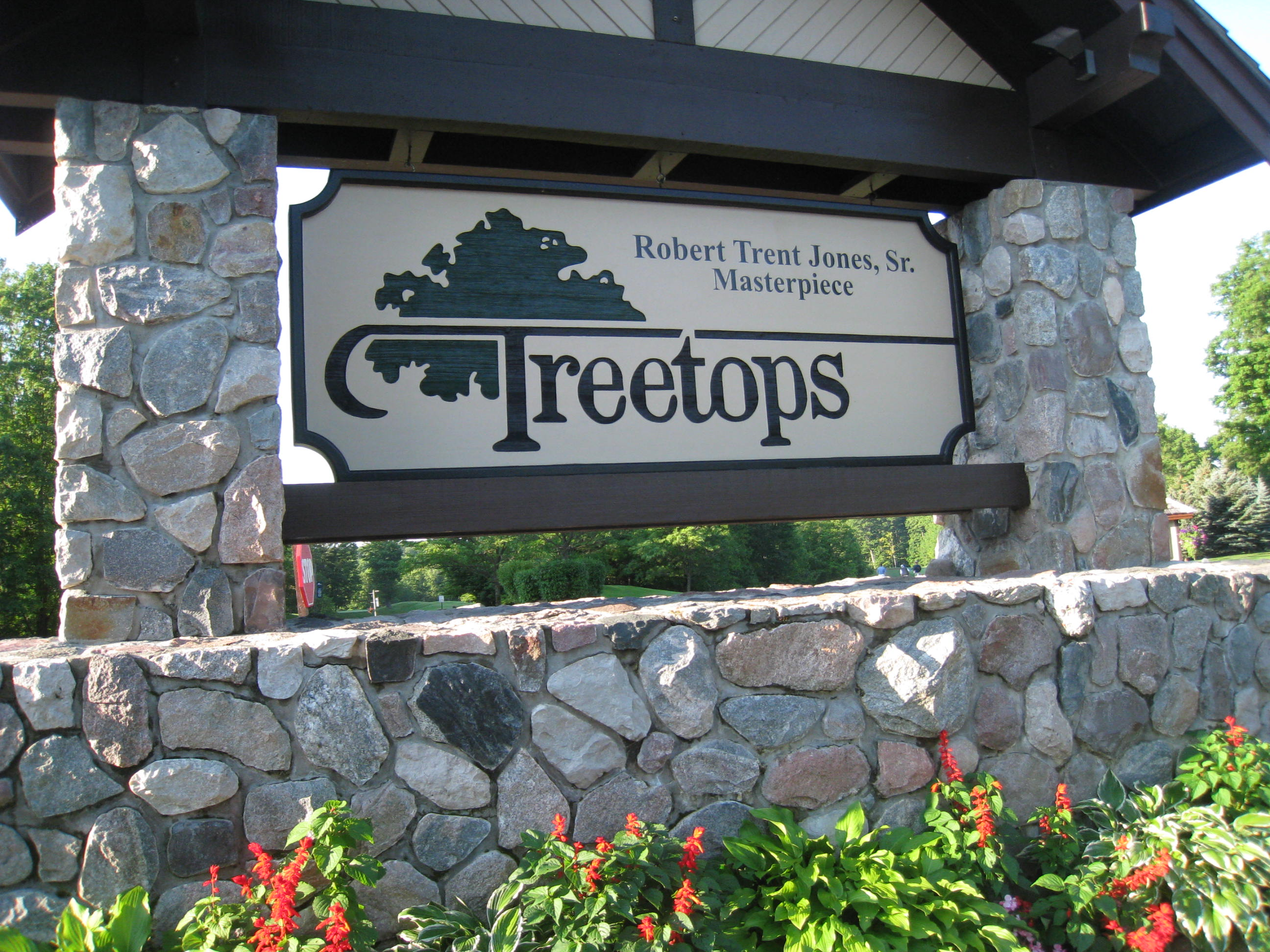

Club information
- Location: Gaylord, Michigan, USA
- Type: Public
- Owned by: Rick Smith (Golf Operations)
- Operated by: Treetops Resort Management
- Events hosted: ESPN Par-3 Shootout (1999-2006)
- Website: treetops.com

Masterpiece
- Designed by: Robert Trent Jones Sr.
- Par: 71
- Length: 6,932 yards

Premier
- Designed by: Tom Fazio
- Par: 72
- Length: 6,832 yards

Signature
- Designed by: Rick Smith
- Par: 71
- Length: 6,653 yards

Threetops
- Designed by: Rick Smith
- Par: 27 (Par 3 course)
- Length: 1,420 yards

Tradition
- Designed by: Rick Smith
- Par: 72
- Length: 6,544 yards

Treetops Resort is a golf resort located near Gaylord, Michigan, United States. It features multiple golf courses designed by Robert Trent Jones, Sr., Tom Fazio and Rick Smith.

== History ==
Founded in the early 1980s, Treetops Resort in Gaylord, Michigan, initially focused on skiing. In 1987, it introduced the Masterpiece Course, its first golf course designed by Robert Trent Jones Sr. The 1990s saw significant growth with the addition of The Premier and The Signature Courses, and the par-3 Threetops course. The resort gained national attention in the 2000s by hosting the ESPN Par-3 Shootout.

== Competitions and Tournaments ==
- ESPN Par-3 Shootout (1999–2006)
- Michigan PGA Section Championship.
- Rick Smith Invitational.
- Treetops Charity Invitational.

== Awards and recognition ==
- Best Courses You Can Play in Michigan by Golfweek.
- Top-100 Resort Courses in America by Golf Digest.
- Best Par-3 Course in America by Golf Magazine.
