= Bridgestone Golf =

Golf equipment manufacturer

Bridgestone Golf, Inc.
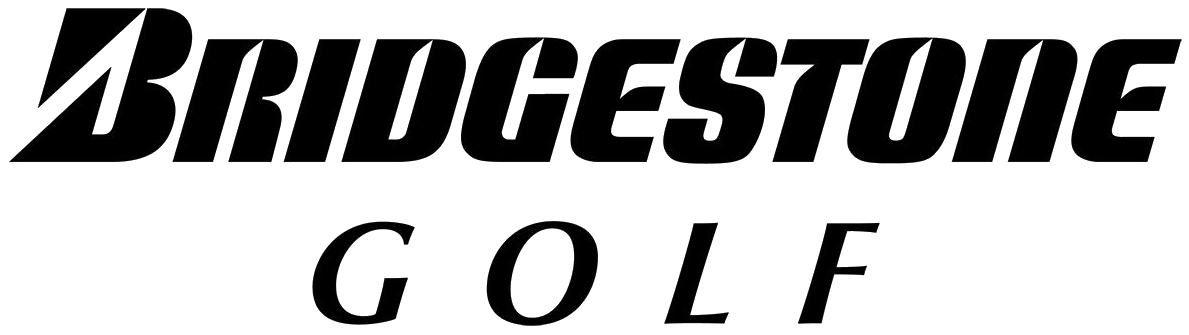
- Type: Subsidiary
- Industry: Sports equipment
- Founded: 1931; 95 years ago
- Headquarters: Covington, Georgia, United States
- Key people: Dan Murphy (president and CEO)
- Products: Golf clubs, golf balls
- Parent: Bridgestone
- Website: bridgestonegolf.com

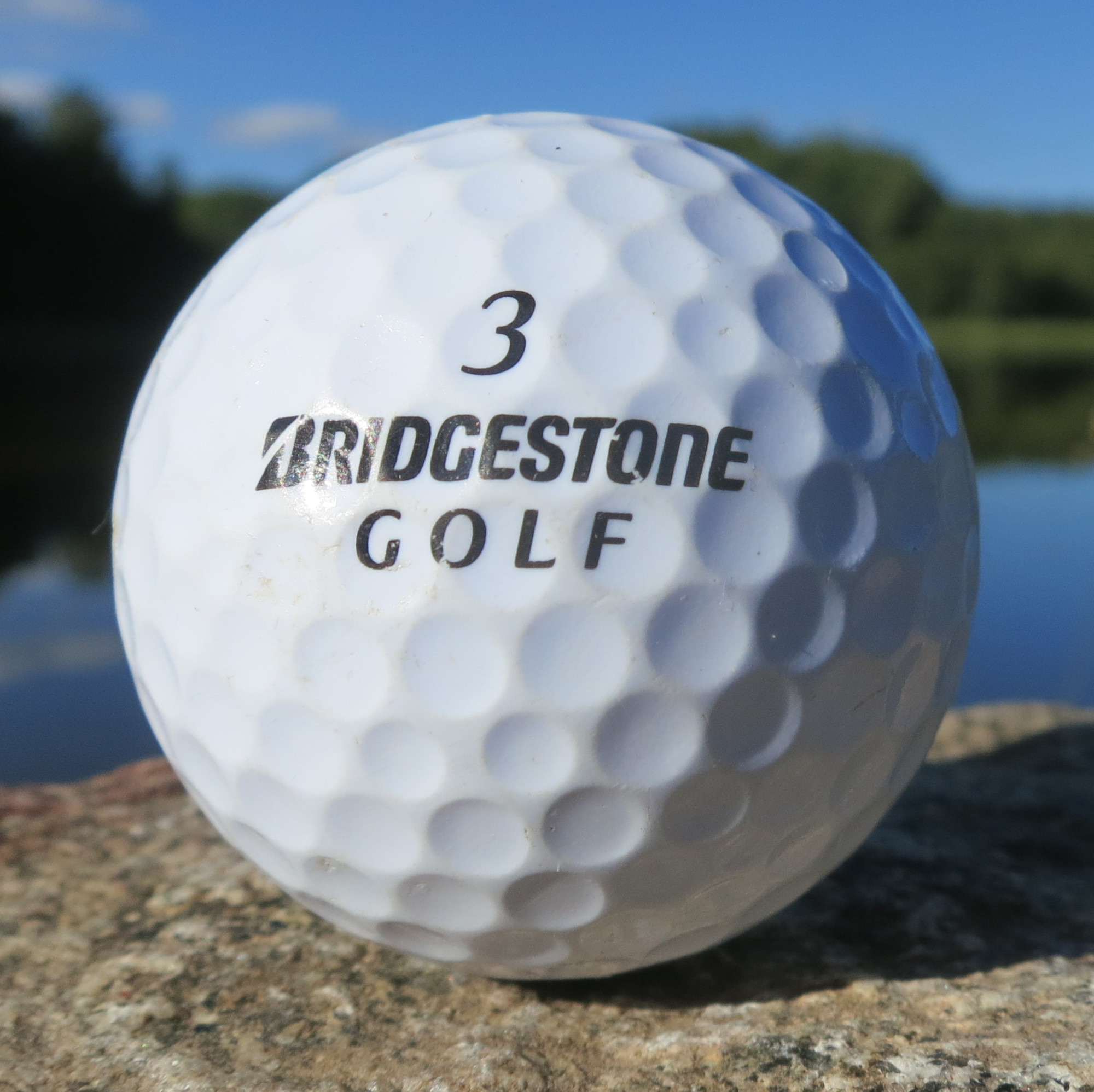
Circa 2020 golf ball by Bridgestone Golf

Bridgestone Golf, Inc. is a sports equipment company based in Covington, Georgia, United States. The company is a subsidiary of Bridgestone. It designs and manufactures a full range of golf equipment including balls, clubs, and accessories utilizing both the Bridgestone and Precept brand names.

== History ==
Its parent company Bridgestone was founded in 1931 by Shojiro Ishibashi, and first produced golf balls in 1935. It was not until 1972 that the company's involvement in golf expanded into the manufacture of clubs.

== Endorsements ==
When Nike closed its golf division in 2016, Tiger Woods signed a golf ball contract with Bridgestone Golf. Other golfers who are signed to Bridgestone Golf include Fred Couples, Matt Kuchar and Jason Day.

== See also ==
- Bridgestone
