= Golf Central =

- Genre: Sports
- Starring: Anna Jackson; Jimmy Roberts; George Savaricas; Cara Banks
- Country of origin: United States
- Original language: English
- No. of seasons: 23

Production
- Executive producer: Adam Hertzog
- Producer: Mark Summer
- Running time: 22 minutes

Original release
- Network: Golf Channel
- Release: January 17, 1995 – present

Related
- College Central; Golf Central UK

Golf Central is Golf Channel's news program. It was launched in 1995, in the same year as the network it airs on.

A nightly half-hour show, Golf Central features news and highlights from the major golf tours and events around the world, as well as on-site reports from tournaments.

== Format ==
The show's anchor format varies — sometimes there is just one anchor at the desk; sometimes an anchor is joined by an analyst for tournament recaps; or two anchors are used. With the recent additions of new talent for the show, the latter format has been utilized more recently. There is no permanent anchor team, as anchor teams vary from night to night.

While tournaments are in progress, editions of Golf Central air every half hour to provide updates on the current event, including highlights and leaderboards. During notable golf events (such as the Men's major tournaments and the Ryder Cup, among others), Golf Channel also airs special Live From editions of Golf Central before and after their respective broadcasts—which provides special extended coverage on-location from tournament sites; including analysis and coverage of press conferences.

== Anchors and other contributors ==
Talent on the show varies from night to night, but in the show's rotation are several people who appear on the show in anchor roles. Those people are Cara Banks, Rich Lerner, Anna Jackson, Jimmy Roberts, Todd Lewis, Steve Burkowski, Amy Rogers and Matt Adams. The show also features a number of analysts, who appear regularly to give opinions and insight, these include Brandel Chamblee, Jim Gallagher, Jr, Tripp Isenhour, Billy Kratzert, Johnson Wagner and Mark Rolfing.
