= Stephanie Sparks =

American golfer and TV presenter

Personal information
- Nationality: United States
- Born: July 18, 1973 Wheeling, West Virginia, U.S.
- Died: April 13, 2024 (aged 50)

Career
- Sport: Golf
- College: Duke University
- Turned professional: 1996
- Former tours: LPGA Tour (2000); Futures Tour (1996–1999)

Best results in LPGA major championships
- Chevron Championship: DNP
- Women's PGA C'ship: CUT: 2000
- U.S. Women's Open: CUT: 1992, 1994
- du Maurier Classic: CUT: 2000

Mary Stephanie Sparks (July 18, 1973 – April 13, 2024) was an American golfer and on-air personality at The Golf Channel. As a player, her best years in golf came as an amateur.

== Early life and amateur career ==
Sparks was born on July 18, 1973 in Wheeling, West Virginia.

From 1992 to 1994, she played golf at Duke University, where she was an All-America. A wrist injury threatened her career early, though, and she was forced to quit the team before graduating in 1996. As an amateur, Sparks won the 1993 Women's Western Amateur, a Women's Eastern Amateur, a West Virginia State Amateur, and the 1992 North and South Women's Amateur at Pinehurst.

== Professional career ==
In 1996, after graduation, Sparks joined the Futures Tour, the LPGA's developmental tour. In 1999, she got her LPGA card in a playoff at Q-School. 2000 was Sparks' only season as an LPGA player (she became a professional as a Futures Tour player), as back surgery at season's end forced her to retire. She made one cut at the Electrolux USA Championship in Nashville, Tennessee, earning $997.

=== Broadcasting career ===
Sparks' time at The Golf Channel began as a production assistant in the cable television network's original productions department. In fact, the very first time Sparks appeared in front of a camera was in the 2004 film, Bobby Jones: A Stroke of Genius. In the movie, Sparks played Alexa Stirling, the winner of three consecutive United States Women's Amateur Golf Championships and a close friend of the legendary golfer. To try out for the part, Sparks went to an open audition during a lunch break in Orlando, where The Golf Channel's studios are located. To her surprise, she got the part, even without prior acting experience. She had just two scenes in the movie, and shooting them took just two days in the Autumn of 2003. Though Jones and Stirling were considered great golfers in their day, the big contrast between Sparks and the film's star, Jim Caviezel, who played Bobby Jones, was that Sparks was once a great player with much promise, though it was never completely fulfilled, and Caviezel had never picked up a golf club in his life. Sparks has said, though, that she has no desire to pursue an acting career, that it was just a great experience. She also said that working with Caviezel was "surreal."

The film debuted in April 2004, and Sparks' first time in front of a camera for The Golf Channel took place in July 2004, when she began hosting Golf With Style! Sparks also anchored short Golf Central updates on Thursdays and Fridays to tell viewers what's going on in the early part of a round at a golf tournament. Sparks also co-hosted the third edition of The Golf Channel's reality television competition show, The Big Break, titled, The Big Break III: Ladies Only, alongside Vince Cellini. It was the first time hosting the show for Sparks and Cellini. In the Fall of 2005, Sparks and Cellini returned to host The Big Break IV: USA vs. Europe. They returned again on February 7, 2006, for The Big Break V: Hawaii, a second "ladies only" edition. Sparks also hosted many of the Golf Channel's program, "Playing Lessons With the Pros," where she along with a professional golfer offer tips while they play.

== Personal life ==
Sparks lived in Orlando, Florida.

She died on April 13, 2024, at the age of 50. Sparks was survived by her parents and her sister.

== Team appearances ==
Amateur

- Curtis Cup (representing the United States): 1994 (tie)
