= Vince Cellini =

American sportscaster (born 1959)

- Born: Vincent Robert Cellini; June 10, 1959 (age 67); Cleveland, Ohio, U.S.
- Education: College of Wooster (BA)
- Employer: TNT Sports

Vincent Robert Cellini (/tʃəˈliːni/; born June 10, 1959) is an American sports broadcaster for radio and television, currently working at NBA TV and TNT Sports.

== Early life and career ==
Cellini was a lifeguard at Grovewood, a city pool on the east side of Cleveland.

In 1981, Cellini graduated from the College of Wooster in Wooster, Ohio, with a bachelor's degree in communications. Cellini played tight end on the college's football team. He set three team records: most touchdowns in a season and in a career, and yards per catch in a season.

In 1982, Cellini began working as a sports anchor and reporter at Cleveland's WJW-TV. He also hosted a sports talk radio show on WWWE Radio in Cleveland.

== CNN/Turner Sports ==
In 1989, Cellini left WJW-TV to join CNN Sports. In 1996, Cellini earned a CableACE Award for his work on CNN Sports Tonight, which he co-hosted with Van Earl Wright. He also hosted a late-night program "Calling All Sports" from 1994 to 1995. He left the program and later joined the TNT Sunday Night NFL broadcasting team.

Cellini joined the network in January 2003 after a long stint at the now defunct CNNSI network. During his tenure within Ted Turner's company, Cellini also worked on CNN itself at times, and was working alongside anchor Carol Lin at the CNN Center in Atlanta, Georgia, at the time of the September 11, 2001 attacks.

== The Golf Channel ==
Cellini's first day on The Golf Channel was January 13, 2003, when he assumed hosting duties from Peter Kessler on Golf Talk. The first guest Cellini interviewed on that night was golfer Arnold Palmer, who, along with Joseph Gibbs, co-founded The Golf Channel in 1995. Cellini's other Golf Channel duties include anchoring the network's flagship news show, Golf Central, and hosting "Top Shelf Wednesday", a 2 1/2-hour primetime lineup of shows. In February 2005, Cellini, along with fellow Golf Channel colleague Stephanie Sparks, began hosting the network's reality television competition show, The Big Break, with their tenure as hosts beginning with the show's third season, The Big Break III: Ladies Only. They also hosted The Big Break IV: USA vs. Europe, which aired in the Fall of 2005. Cellini and Sparks returned to host again on February 7, 2006, for The Big Break V: Hawaii, a second "ladies only" edition. Cellini left The Golf Channel in July 2007, then rejoined the channel the following January. According to different internet sources, including Golfweek.com, his contract, which expired in 2009, was not renewed after much negotiations.

== Return to Turner Sports ==
Cellini serves as a full-time host for NBA TV's GameTime and a collection of online programs across Turner Sports' digital properties. A longtime cable sports veteran, Cellini was a former anchor on Sports Tonight and received a Cable ACE Award for his work in 1996.

Cellini is the host of mini-shows titled "Fantasy Showdown" and "The Preview Show" for Nascar.com, as of August 18, 2011.

Cellini has covered the PGA Championship since 2011 for TNT.

=== Other work ===
Since 2010, he has been co-host of Hawks Live show with Mike Glenn. This half-hour show precedes and then follows NBA Atlanta Hawks Telecasts on SportSouth. Beginning in 2011, he has also been co-hosting a local Cleveland-area golf show called "Par Three Shootout".

== Personal ==
Cellini is married with three sons. His brother, Nick Cellini, is a sports radio personality in Atlanta, Georgia with WCNN (680 The Fan).

In November 2021, Cellini was arrested in Cobb County, Georgia for driving under the influence after causing an accident by driving on the wrong side of the road. The victim of the accident was awarded a $15 million settlement.
