= Golf Channel =

American television channel devoted to golf

- Country: United States
- Broadcast area: United States; Canada; Latin America and the Caribbean; EMEA; Asia-Pacific
- Headquarters: Stamford, Connecticut

Programming
- Language: English
- Picture format: 1080i HDTV

Ownership
- Owner: Versant
- Parent: USA Sports
- Sister channels: CNBC; Syfy; E!; MS NOW; Oxygen; USA Network

History
- Launched: January 17, 1995; 31 years ago

Links
- Website: www.golfchannel.com

Availability

Streaming media
- Service(s): DirecTV Stream, FuboTV, Hulu + Live TV, Sling TV, YouTube TV

Golf Channel (also verbally referred to as simply "Golf") is an American sports television network owned by Versant. Founded in Birmingham, Alabama, it is currently based at NBC Sports' headquarters in Stamford, Connecticut despite the network being spun off from NBC in November 2025.

Launched on January 16, 1995, the channel focuses on coverage of the sport of golf, including live coverage of tournaments, as well as factual and instructional programming. It is the cable television rightsholder of the PGA Tour, LPGA Tour, and PGA European Tour, and also holds rights to selected USGA tournaments and the NCAA Division I golf championships. Since 2016, it has also participated in NBC's coverage of the Summer Olympics, focusing on its golf competitions.

Via the Golf Channel unit, Versant also owns other golf-related businesses, including the course reservation service GolfNow, online golf instruction provider Revolution Golf, and the World Long Drive Championship. Some of these associated properties operate from the network's former home of Orlando, Florida.

As of December 2023, Golf Channel is available to approximately 59 million pay television households in the United States-down from its 2012 peak of 85 million households.

== History ==
The idea of a 24-hour golf network came from media entrepreneur Joseph E. Gibbs of Birmingham, Alabama, who first thought of such a concept in 1991. Gibbs felt there was enough interest in golf among the public to support such a network, and commissioned a Gallup Poll to see if his instincts were correct. With the support of the polling behind him, Gibbs and legendary golfer Arnold Palmer then secured $80 million in financing from several cable television providers (including Adelphia Communications Corporation, Cablevision Industries, Comcast, Continental Cablevision, Newhouse, and the Times Mirror Company) to launch the network, which was among the first subscription networks developed to cover one singular sport.

Announced in February 1993, the launch date was targeted for May 1994; and it was launched on January 17, 1995, as The Golf Channel with a ceremonial flip of the switch by co-founder Arnold Palmer. The first live tournament the channel televised was the Dubai Desert Classic, held January 19–22. Originally a premium channel with limited subscribers, it retooled in September 1995 to be part of basic-tier pay television to reach more viewers, and ratings rapidly increased. In 1996, Fox Cable Networks acquired a minority stake in the channel for $50 million.

From 1999 to 2001, Golf Channel held part of the PGA Tour's cable rights for early-round coverage. To boost their availability, Golf Channel reached an agreement with Fox Sports Networks (FSN) to air simulcasts of the coverage. In 2002, Golf Channel lost its rights to the main PGA Tour, but gained rights to the developmental Buy.com Tour.

=== Acquisition by Comcast ===
In 2001, Fox sold its 30.9% stake in Golf Channel, as well as its stake in Outdoor Life Network, to minority owner Comcast as part of a larger transaction by Fox to acquire Comcast's stake in Speedvision. In December 2003, Comcast acquired the remaining 8.6% stake of Golf Channel it did not already own from the Tribune Company, giving it full ownership.

In January 2007, Golf Channel became the exclusive cable broadcaster of the PGA Tour as part of a new 15-year contract, replacing ESPN and USA Network. The contract included early-round coverage of all official money events, and 13 events per-season carried exclusively by the network. By then, Golf Channel had carriage in 75 million homes. It also simplified its branding, dropping the article The from its on-air name.

Concurrently, Comcast also launched Versus/Golf HD, a 1080i high definition channel featuring programming from Golf Channel and sister network Versus. Golf Channel programming was broadcast during the daytime hours, and Versus programming was broadcast during the evening and primetime hours. This arrangement ended in December 2008, when both networks launched their own 24-hour high-definition simulcasts.

In March 2008, Comcast acquired the online golf reservation platform GolfNow. It was re-located to Golf Channel's headquarters in Orlando.

=== Merger with NBC Sports ===
In January 2011, Comcast acquired a 51% majority stake in NBC Universal from General Electric. As a result of the re-alignment of Comcast's existing properties into NBC Universal, Golf Channel and sister sports network Versus were subsumed by a restructured NBC Sports division. On-air synergies between NBC's existing production unit began to take effect in February 2011 at the WGC Match Play Championship, when NBC's golf telecasts took on the Golf Channel branding as "Golf Channel on NBC", in a similar manner to ESPN's co-branding of sports output on ABC. NBC Sports personalities could now appear on Golf Channel, and former NBC Sports senior vice president Mike McCarley took over as the network's new head. The network also adopted an amended logo featuring the NBC peacock.

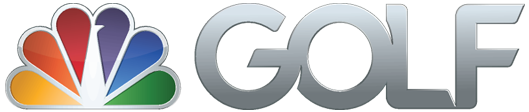
Logo: 2014–2024

In December 2013, Golf Channel unveiled a new logo, replacing the "swinging G" emblem with a wordmark alongside the NBC peacock; it was intended to provide a unified brand across Golf Channel's associated properties and services. The new logo took effect on-air in May 2014, coinciding with the 2014 Players Championship. That month, it also partnered with Sirius XM PGA Tour Radio to feature audio simulcasts of its studio programming.

In 2014, Golf Channel acquired rights to the NCAA Division I Men's Golf Championship. In 2015, it also began to broadcast the NCAA Division I Women's Golf Championships. In 2017, Golf Channel extended its rights to the tournaments through 2029.

On June 8, 2015, it was announced that NBC Sports had acquired rights to The Open Championship beginning in 2017 under a 12-year deal; after former broadcaster ESPN opted out of the final year of rights, NBC began coverage in 2016 instead. Early round coverage was aired by Golf Channel, which marked the first time ever that it had ever broadcast one of the Men's major golf championships. On May 3, 2016, NBC announced that Golf Channel would air the bulk of the men's and women's golf tournaments for the 2016 Summer Olympics, covering up to 300 hours of the tourney, with 130 of those hours live.

In 2016, Golf Channel acquired the Long Drivers of America, organizer of the World Long Drive Championships; the network would rebrand it as the World Long Drivers Association (WLDA), and expanded it into a series of annual, televised events. In 2017, Golf Channel acquired Revolution Golf, an online provider of golf instructional materials.

On January 14, 2018, broadcast technicians represented by IATSE went on strike affecting tournament coverage for the Sony Open in Honolulu, Hawaii, Web.com from the Bamahas and Diamond Resorts Invitational in Orlando. Ten days later the striking workers returned to work after a new contract was ratified on January 24, 2018.

In February 2019, Golf Channel announced a new subscription service known as GolfPass. The service will feature a variety of content, including a streaming library of archive content, instructional content, as well as special offers (such as credit for free round of golf per-year, and a premium tier offering additional discounts). Rory McIlroy will also be involved in the service, hosting new instructional content for GolfPass, as well as an autobiographical web series.

In February 2020, it was reported that Golf Channel would consolidate its television operations with the remainder of NBC Sports at its facilities in Stamford, Connecticut, in a move expected to occur over the next 12 to 18 months. The GolfNow and GolfPass services will continue to primarily operate from Orlando.

In 2020, due to the COVID-19 pandemic, Golf Channel suspended the WLDA and disclosed an intent to sell the competition. On May 17, 2020, the network hosted a charity skins game known as TaylorMade Driving Relief at the Seminole Golf Club in Juno Beach, Florida, as the first televised golf event in the United States since the suspension of the PGA Tour season. The event featured Rory McIlroy, Dustin Johnson, Rickie Fowler, and Matthew Wolff, and was simulcast by NBC and NBCSN.

In 2021, amid the renewal of NBC Sports' rights to the circuit, and the upcoming shutdown of long-time sister network NBCSN (the former Versus), NBCUniversal began to put a greater emphasis on Golf Channel's rights to the PGA Tour. That November, it was announced that early-round coverage of the Open Championship, U.S. Open (which moved to Golf Channel after NBC re-acquired the rights to USGA tournaments in 2020), and their women's counterparts, would move to USA Network in 2022. At the 2022 Players Championship, Golf Channel adopted a special logo used on-air during PGA Tour telecasts and studio programming, which is co-branded with elements of the PGA Tour logo.

In 2023, Golf Channel sold World Long Drive to GF Sports and Entertainment; the circuit was merged with the Professional Long Drivers Association (which was established in the wake of Golf Channel's suspension of the WLDA, and had also been acquired by GF Sports and Entertainment), and renewed its media rights with Golf Channel under a five-year deal.

=== Versant spin-off ===
In November 2024, Comcast announced that it would spin off most of NBCUniversal's cable networks, including Golf Channel, as a new company known as Versant, which would be controlled by Comcast shareholders. Golf Channel began operating under the new USA Sports unit following the split. As part of a series of a rebrandings to remove the NBC logo from Versant's properties, Golf Channel amended its logo to reintroduce the network's original "swinging G" emblem, in tandem with its existing wordmark. In December 2025, Versant renewed its partnerships with Rory McIlroy through 2038, which will see him continue to develop content for GolfPass, and partner with Versant on a new studio called Firethorn Productions. On July 6, 2026, Versant announced that it will acquire golf simulator manufacturer Full Swing for $530 million; post-acquisition, it will operate as part of the Golf Channel unit and report to Versant's Digital Platforms and Ventures division.

== Programming ==
=== Event coverage ===
Golf Channel is the pay television rightsholder of the PGA Tour, broadcasting live coverage of early rounds, and early window coverage of weekend rounds prior to network television coverage. Some events (particularly, late-season events such as the former Fall Series, and additional events) are broadcast in their entirety by the network. Golf Channel airs primetime encores of each round during PGA Tour events, including network television broadcasts from NBC or CBS where applicable. If the schedule permits, Golf Channel may also provide coverage produced by CBS if weather delays force golf coverage to run past the scheduled window using CBS production staff and graphics. Golf Channel also broadcasts coverage of PGA Tour Champions and Korn Ferry Tour events. Outside of events organized by the PGA Tour, Golf Channel also carries coverage of the European Tour, LPGA Tour, and Asian Tour.

Golf Channel has held rights to the LPGA, most recently renewed in 2020. Beginning in 2026, all LPGA events will be broadcast live in their entirety for the first time on Golf Channel or CNBC.

Golf Channel was the cable broadcaster of two of the men's majors, including the U.S. Open and other USGA championships (since June 2020) and the Open Championship (since 2016, including their women's and senior men's events). In November 2021, it was announced that early round coverage of the U.S. Open, the Open Championship, the U.S. Women's Open, and the Women's British Open, would move to USA Network beginning in 2022.

Since 2016, it participates in NBCUniversal's coverage of the Summer Olympics by covering its golf competitions. It has also carried coverage of the Ryder Cup and Solheim Cup alongside NBC, and the NCAA Division I Men's and Women's golf championships.

Since its integration with NBC Sports, Golf Channel has been infrequently used as an overflow channel for non-golf programming, including two games of the 2018 Stanley Cup playoffs (due to programming conflicts with USA Network and CNBC), and as part of NBC's "Championship Sunday" effort to televise all matches on the final matchday of the Premier League soccer season.

In October 2025, Golf Channel announced the "Golf Channel Games", an exhibition skills competition held at Trump National Golf Club Jupiter in Jupiter, Florida, between teams led by Rory McIlroy and Scottie Scheffler. It was held on December 17, 2025, and aired in simulcast on Golf Channel and USA Network. The event was a spiritual successor to TNT Sports' The Match franchise, produced by its co-creator Bryan Zuriff.

Golf Channel has also aired replays of classic events, often under the anthology Golf's Greatest Rounds.

=== News and analysis ===
Golf Channel's long-time flagship program has been Golf Central, which features golf news and highlights. During significant events such as men's majors, Golf Channel broadcasts extended Live From editions of Golf Central from the tournament site to provide additional coverage.

In 2021, following the network's relocation to Stamford, Golf Channel ended its long-time morning show Morning Drive, replacing it with the new midday show Golf Today beginning January 4, 2021. In December 2024, the channel picked up a television simulcast of 5 Clubs, a podcast hosted by former Morning Drive host Gary Williams. In November 2025, Golf Channel acquired additional podcasts, including The Big Swing with Jimmy Roberts, The Smylie Show with Smylie Kaufman, and Vanity Index with Wells Adams.

=== Non-event programming ===
Alongside event coverage, Golf Channel has aired factual and reality-style programming dealing with golf.

From 2003 to 2015, Golf Channel aired The Big Break, a reality competition series featuring professional golfers competing in skills challenges for a chance to win a sponsor exemption in a developmental circuit and/or a PGA Tour or LPGA event. In 2025, it was announced that The Big Break would be revived for a 24th season in partnership with the golf-oriented digital media company Good Good.

- Feherty
- Golf's Greatest Rounds
- The Conor Moore Show
- Golf Road Trippin' with James Davis
- Better Off with Hally Leadbetter
- On Tour On Course

=== Instructional ===
- Golf Channel Academy
- PGA Tour Champions Learning Center
- Playing Lessons
- School Of Golf
- The Golf Fix

== Notable personalities ==
Golf Channel uses a number of people for tournament, news and instructional programming.

=== Current personalities ===
==== Hosts / reporters ====
- Tom Abbott
- Grant Boone
- Steve Burkowski
- Kira K. Dixon
- Terry Gannon
- Damon Hack
- Rex Hoggard
- Anna Jackson
- Ryan Lavner
- Rich Lerner
- Todd Lewis
- Eamon Lynch
- Amy Rogers
- Steve Sands
- George Savaricas

==== Analysts ====
- Notah Begay III
- Amanda Blumenherst
- Billy Ray Brown
- Curt Byrum
- Brandel Chamblee
- Kay Cockerill
- John Cook
- Brendon De Jonge
- Graham DeLaet
- Emilia Doran
- Brad Faxon
- Jim Gallagher Jr.
- Tripp Isenhour
- Julia Johnson
- Smylie Kaufman
- Jim "Bones" Mackay
- Paige Mackenzie
- Roger Maltbie
- Paul McGinley
- Arron Oberholser
- Morgan Pressel
- Mel Reid
- Mark Rolfing
- Karen Stupples

=== Notable former personalities ===
- Brian Anderson
- Billy Andrade (2010–2012)
- Lara Baldesarra (2012–2013)
- Cara Banks (2015-2025)
- Adam Barr
- Michael Breed
- Ryan Burr (2012-2020)
- Donna Caponi-Byrnes
- Lisa Cornwell (2014-2020)
- Robert Damron
- Beth Daniel (2007–2010)
- Charles Davis
- Casey DeSantis
- Steve Duemig
- David Feherty (2011-2022)
- Jerry Foltz (1999–2022)
- Matt Gogel (2007-2021)
- Jim Gray
- Brian Hammons (1995–2015)
- Trevor Immelman (2016–2022)
- Kraig Kann (1995–2011)
- Jim Kelly
- Peter Kessler (1995–2002)
- Gary Koch (1996–2022)
- Erik Kuselias (2011–2012)
- Justin Leonard (2015–2022)
- Ann Liguori
- Nancy Lopez
- Mark Lye
- Andrew Magee
- John Mahaffey (2004–2019)
- Chantel McCabe
- Win McMurry
- Johnny Miller (2011–2019)
- Jennifer Mills (1995–2006)
- Peter Oosterhuis (1995–2014)
- Phil Parkin (2006–2015)
- Dottie Pepper (2005–2012)
- Ahmad Rashad (2013)
- Tim Rosaforte (2007–2019)
- Charlie Rymer
- Kristina Shalhoup
- Val Skinner (2002–2013)
- Holly Sonders (2011–2014)
- Stephanie Sparks (2000–2013)
- Kathryn Tappen (2022)
- Brian Tennyson
- Lauren Thompson (2008–2020)
- Kelly Tilghman
- Ted Tryba
- Bob Valvano
- Scott Van Pelt (1995–2000)
- Lanny Wadkins
- Johnson Wagner (2022-2025)

== Viewership ==
For the month of October 2013, Golf Channel averaged a daily viewership of 84,000.

== International versions ==
=== Canada ===
Golf Channel is available in Canada on most cable and satellite providers, as it is authorized for carriage as a foreign cable television service by the Canadian Radio-television and Telecommunications Commission. While it mostly airs the American feed, live events coverage is subject to blackouts due to TSN holding many of its broadcasting rights domestically.

Contrarily, the Canadian feed has carried coverage of some events whose rights are not owned by a Canadian network—particularly early round coverage of The Open Championship, as TSN only holds rights to NBC's network coverage)—but became unavailable in the country due to their move to USA Network and/or Peacock.

=== Poland ===
Golf Channel Poland (Polish Golf Channel Polska) is a licensed version of the network owned by MWE Networks launched on March 18, 2017.

=== Golf Channel UK ===
A British version of the channel called Golf Channel UK was operated by sporting goods retailer JJB Sports, and was available on the BSkyB satellite service. It broadcast many of the programs seen on the U.S. channel, but was unable to attract a viable audience as it offered few live golf tournaments; the channel shut down on December 31, 2007.

Since the acquisition of Sky plc by Comcast in late-2018, NBC Sports properties have begun to increase their collaboration with Sky Sports for expanded coverage of relevant events; Golf Channel and Sky Sports Golf trialed on-air talent sharing and co-productions at the 2019 Players Championship.

=== Golf Channel Latin America ===
The Latin American version of the Golf Channel was launched in 2006 as a DirecTV joint venture, and was acquired from DirecTV by former DirecTV executives Jason Markham and Evan Grayer together with Inversiones Bahia in 2018. The channel broadcasts professional tournaments from the PGA Tour, PGA Tour Latinoamérica, European Tour and LPGA Tour with Spanish-speaking journalists, as well as Golf Central and other English-language shows. In 2019, Discovery bought the channel, but continues to license the brand and service marks for Golf Channel from Comcast.
