= TMRW Sports =

American sports promoter

TMRW Sports (pronounced "tomorrow sports") is an American sports company founded by sports executive Mike McCarley and professional golfers Rory McIlroy and Tiger Woods. Established in 2022, the company's first major venture was founding the TGL (or TMRW Golf League). Since then, TMRW has launched the WTGL and has been announced as an operational partner of the National Football League (NFL) in a planned professional flag football league.

== Golf leagues and ventures ==
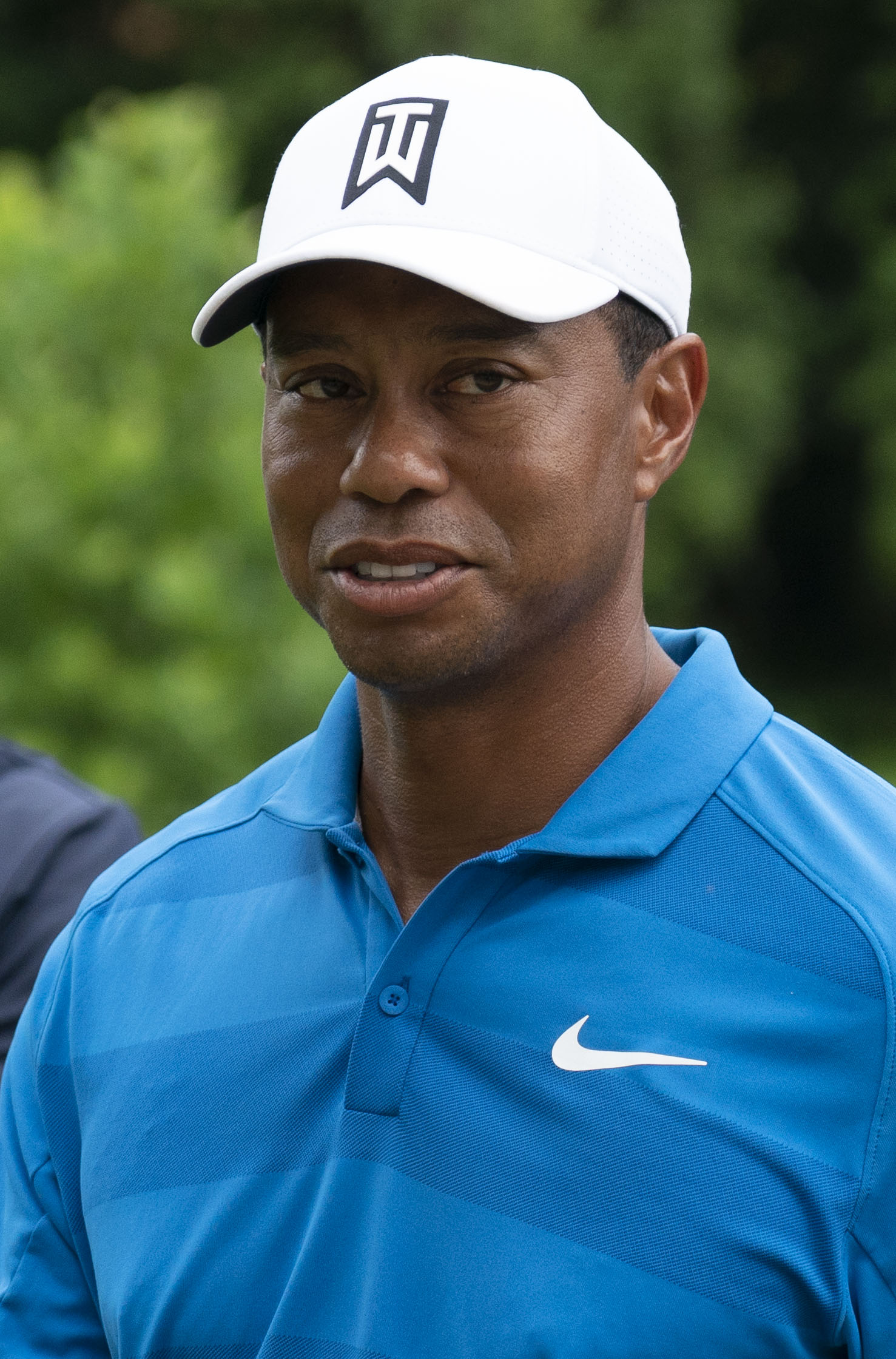
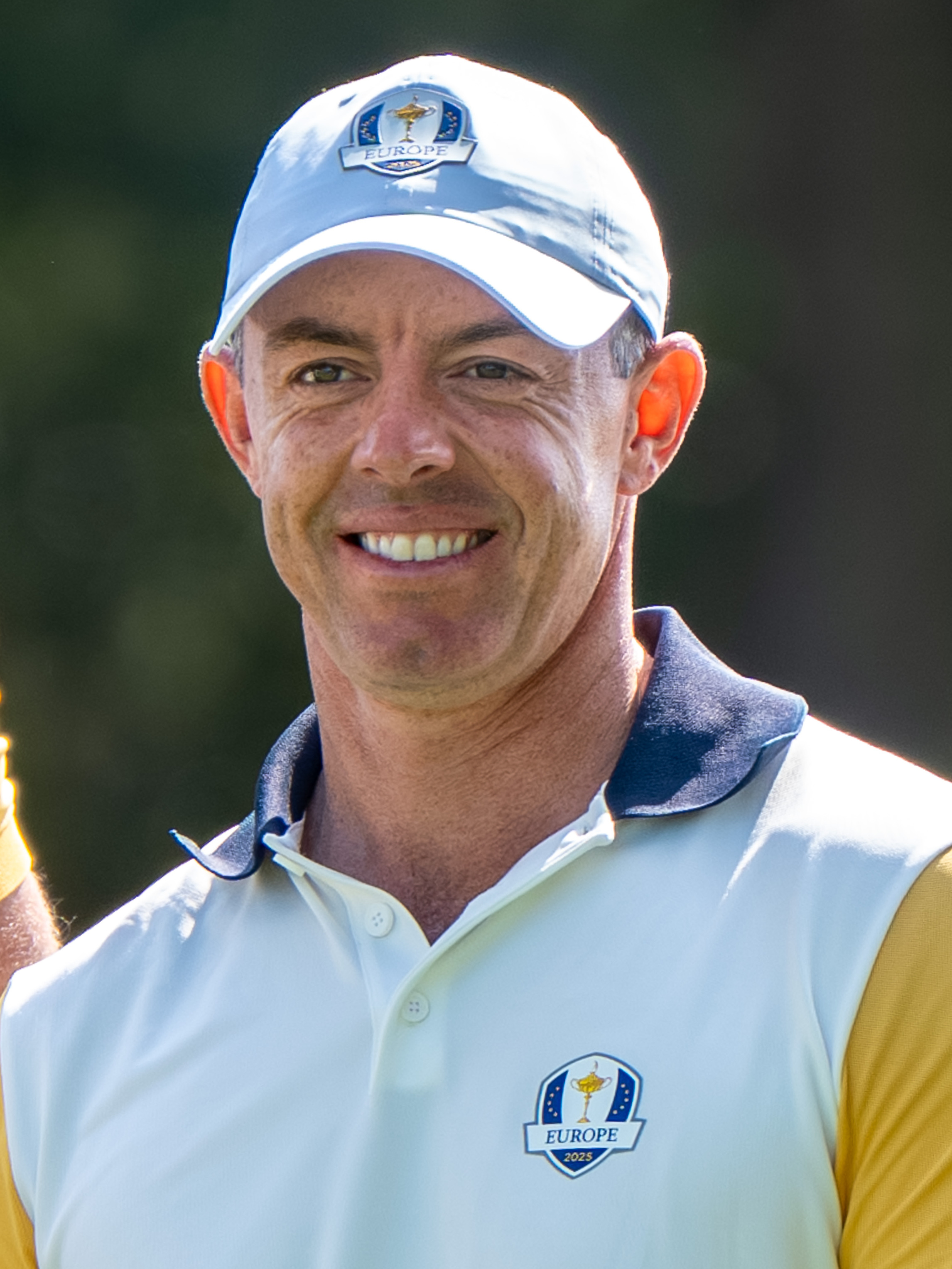
Co-founders Tiger Woods (left) and Rory McIlroy

=== TGL ===
TMRW's first major venture was their eponymous golf league, the TMRW Golf League or TGL. Announced on August 24, 2022, the league was founded as a partnership with the PGA Tour, featuring PGA Tour players also featuring in the TGL. The league employs a combination of traditional golf play with elements of simulated indoor golf.

The inaugural season began in 2025, with matches held on weeknights in conjunction and accommodation with the PGA Tour schedule.

=== WTGL ===
On January 6, 2026, TMRW announced the Women's TMRW Golf League (WTGL), in partnership with the LPGA. Set to begin play in late 2026, WTGL golfers will play the same format as TGL players at the SoFi Center in Palm Beach Gardens, Florida. Players will hit shots at a five story simulator screen and play on a green that rotates 360 degrees. The first five women to join WTGL were Jeeno Thitikul of Thailand, Charley Hull of England, Lydia Ko of New Zealand, Brooke Henderson of Canada and Lexi Thompson of the United States.

=== Skins Game ===
On November 28, 2025, the Skins Game made a return to television after a 15-year hiatus, produced by TMRW Sports. The Skins Game aired on Amazon Prime Video. Four players competed: Keegan Bradley, Justin Thomas, Tommy Fleetwood and Xander Schauffele.

== Flag football league ==
TMRW Sports was selected to operate a professional flag football league that is under development.
