= NFL–TMRW flag football league =

Professional sport leage for men and women

The National Football League (NFL) and TMRW Sports are developing a professional flag football league for men and women. NFL had plans for a flag football league as early as 2024, with their search for an operational partner landing on TMRW, an American company founded by sports executive TMRW Sports and professional golfers Rory McIlroy and Tiger Woods. The two parties officially announced their partnership on March 30, 2026. During the 2020s, the sport's popularity has grown both in the United States and globally. The NFL has expressed its intent to have the league operational prior to the 2028 Summer Olympics, which will feature the Olympic debut of flag football.

== Background and early development ==
Flag football was noted to have major international growth during the 2020s; by 2026, there were approximately 4.1 million youth flag football players in the United States, an increase of more than 50 percent since 2020, with the sport also being offered at the high school level in 39 states. The number of high school girls also increased by nearly 60 percent from 2024 to 2025. Flag football's growth also included it being added as a sport at the Summer Olympics, with its debut scheduled for the 2028 edition in Los Angeles.

In February 2025, during a Super Bowl LIX media press conference, NFL commissioner Roger Goodell stated that the league was exploring options to create professional men's and women's flag football leagues, adding that it received a "tremendous" amount of investor interest. The NFL was seeking an operating partner, rather than an investment partner". In October, Bloomberg reported that the NFL narrowed its potential flag football partners to two: TMRW Sports, an American sports company co-founded by executive Mike McCarley and professional golfers Rory McIlroy and Tiger Woods, and "a consortium" led by Pro Football Hall of Famer Curtis Martin that included Avenue Capital Group co-founder and CEO Marc Lasry. The NFL declined to confirm the two groups as finalists. In 2022, TMRW Sports founded the TGL, a golf league that began play in 2025. McCarley also previously worked at NBC alongside Dick Ebersol on the network's Sunday Night Football. Lasry's background in sports included being the former co-owner of the Milwaukee Bucks of the National Basketball Association (NBA). Alongside NBA player Stephen Curry, Lasry also co-owns the Bay Golf Club of the TGL. In December, all 32 NFL teams "voted to 'support the development of a professional flag football league' through 32 Equity, the league's investment arm". Following that vote, the NFL began searching for a partner in funding and developing the league.

In February 2026, sports media outlets reported TMRW was being tapped to operate the league, though spokesmen for both the NFL and TMRW declined to comment on specifics at that time. On March 30, the NFL and TMRW Sports officially announced their partnership to develop a professional flag football league for men and women. Upon the announcement, it was also reported that league's investor pool included support from NFL teams, as well as "established institutional and strategic investors and current and former NFL players." Those players include Arik Armstead, Tom Brady, Larry Fitzgerald, Dhani Jones, Eli and Peyton Manning, Joe Montana, Ryan Nece, Justin Tuck, Bobby Wagner, Russell Wilson, and Steve Young. Other investors include Billie Jean King, Ilana Kloss, Alex Morgan, and Serena Williams. Interviewed by ESPN about the league's announcement, Fitzgerald shared that the league had been in the works for two years.

The NFL has expressed its desire to have the league be in operation prior to the debut of flag football at the 2028 Summer Olympics.

== See also ==
- Fanatics Flag Football Classic
