= List of ESPN sports broadcasting rights =

Top to bottom: Logos for ESPN, ESPN on ABC and ESPN+

American cable sports channel ESPN has held numerous broadcasting rights for live and tape-delayed sporting events across many different sports in various levels of competition. ESPN was first launched in 1979 by Bill Rasmussen as a 24-hour national sports network dedicated to live sports and highlights.

In 1984, the American Broadcasting Company (ABC) purchased ESPN from Rasmussen and Getty Oil. Initially, ABC Sports and ESPN operated as separate entities. However, ESPN started to integrate into ABC Sports once The Walt Disney Company purchased Capital Cities/ABC in 1996. During this time, ESPN and ABC began to jointly bid on sports broadcasting rights with ESPN airing and producing games for ABC under a time-buy agreement. This integration was fully completed in August 2006, when ABC fully adopted ESPN's production staff, music, graphics, and broadcast rights. ESPN sports broadcasts that air on ABC now air under the branding ESPN on ABC.

As ESPN has acquired more sports rights, it has launched more linear channels and outlets to help broadcast sports. ESPN launched ESPN2 in 1993 initially as a youthful alternative to ESPN, but now serves as a secondary general sports channel to the main ESPN network. ESPNews was launched in 1996, serving as an overflow feed with limited live sports. ESPNU was launched in 2005 as a channel focused on college athletics with select ancillary general sports programming. Both the SEC Network and ACC Network were launched by ESPN as specialty channels for Southeastern Conference (SEC) and Atlantic Coast Conference (ACC) sports, respectively. ESPN also offers Spanish-language sports broadcasts through ESPN Deportes.

ESPN also broadcasts sports on online streaming platforms. ESPN3 previously served as the main streaming provider of ESPN games, which included exclusive programming and ancillary content. ESPN later launched its own over-the-top subscription streaming service named ESPN+ in 2018, which saw much of ESPN3's content moved to ESPN+ along with its own games exclusive to the service. ESPN+ also streams some ESPN on ABC telecasts. Both the SEC Network and ACC Network have online streaming components to their networks in SEC Network+ (SECN+) and ACC Network Extra (ACCNX), respectively.

== Current rights ==
=== Professional sports ===
Sport	League / Governing Body	Program / Competition	Network(s)	Release	Notes	Ref(s)
American football	National Football League (NFL)	Monday Night Football	ABC; ESPN; ESPN Deportes; ESPN+	2006–present	ESPN exclusive from 2006 to 2019.; Select Monday nights simulcast on ABC, ESPN, and ESPN+ since 2020.; Saturday Week 18 doubleheader broadcast since 2021.; Select Monday nights presented as doubleheaders with three separate games airing on ESPN and ABC simultaneously since 2022.; One game per season streamed exclusively on ESPN+ since 2022.	
American football	National Football League (NFL)	Pro Bowl	ABC; ESPN; ESPN Deportes; ESPN+	1988–1994, 2003–2005, 2010, 2015–present	Acquired rights from ABC in 2003, acquired from CBS in 2010, direct since 2015	
American football	National Football League (NFL)	NFL playoffs and Super Bowl	ABC; ESPN; ESPN+	2015–present	One wild card game broadcast since 2014–15 NFL playoffs. One divisional round game broadcast since 2023–24 NFL playoffs.; Super Bowl LXI marks the first Super Bowl to air on ABC since 2006 (produced by ABC Sports) and the first to be produced by ESPN.	
American football	National Football League (NFL)	NFL Network Games	NFL Network	2026–present	Five european games and a late-season Saturday doubleheader	
American football	National Football League (NFL)	NFL draft	ABC; ESPN; ESPN Deportes	1980–present	ESPN produces a separate broadcast for ABC since 2019.	
American football	United Football League (UFL)	UFL on ESPN	ABC; ESPN; ESPN2; ESPN+	2024–present	Broadcast contract acquired from XFL–USFL merger	
Association football/Soccer	UEFA	UEFA Women's Champions League	ESPN Deportes/ESPN+	2025–present	Spanish–language rights	
Association football/Soccer	The Football Association (FA)	FA Cup	ESPN+	2018–present		
Association football/Soccer	The Football Association (FA)	Women's FA Cup	ESPN+			
Association football/Soccer	The Football Association (FA)	FA Community Shield	ESPN+	2018–present		
Association football/Soccer	The Football Association (FA)	Women's FA Community Shield	ESPN+	2020–present		
Association football/Soccer	The Football Association (FA)	Women's Super League	ESPN2; ESPN+	2024–present	57 matches stream on ESPN+ with a minimum of four matches airing on linear ESPN channels.	
Association football/Soccer	Liga Nacional de Fútbol Profesional	La Liga	ABC; ESPN; ESPN2; ESPN Deportes; ESPN+	2009–2012, 2021–present	Select matches previously broadcast on ESPN2 and ESPN Deportes from 2009 to 2012 in sublicensing agreement with GOL TV. Full broadcast rights since 2021: All matches available to stream on ESPN+.; Spanish-language coverage on ESPN Deportes.; Select matches broadcast on ABC and ESPN.	
Association football/Soccer	DFB	3. Liga	ESPN3	2023–present		
Association football/Soccer	National Women's Soccer League (NWSL)	NWSL on ESPN	ABC; ESPN; ESPN2; ESPN3; ESPNEWS; ESPN+	2014, 2017–2019, 2024–present	ESPN broadcast nine games, six on ESPN2 and three on ESPN3, in 2014.; Games acquired for ESPNEWS in 2017 and expanded to ESPN2 in 2019.; Broadcast rights re-acquired for ABC, ESPN, ESPN2, and ESPN+ in 2024.	
Association football/Soccer	Royal Dutch Football Association (KNVB)	Eredivisie	ESPN+	2018–present		
Association football/Soccer	Royal Dutch Football Association (KNVB)	KNVB Cup	ESPN+	2025–present		
Association football/Soccer	Royal Dutch Football Association (KNVB)	Johan Cruyff Shield	ESPN+	2025–present		
Association football/Soccer	Royal Spanish Football Federation (RFEF)	Copa del Rey	ESPN Deportes; ESPN+	2020–present		
Association football/Soccer	Royal Spanish Football Federation (RFEF)	Copa de la Reina	ESPN+	2020–present		
Association football/Soccer	Royal Spanish Football Federation (RFEF)	Supercopa de España	ABC; ESPN; ESPN2; ESPN Deportes; ESPN+	2020–present	All matches available to stream on ESPN+.: Spanish-language coverage on ESPN Deportes.; ABC, ESPN, and ESPN2 rotated as broadcasters of the tournament.	
Association football/Soccer	Royal Spanish Football Federation (RFEF)	Supercopa de España Femenina	ESPN+	2020–present		
Association football/Soccer	Scottish Football Association (SFA)	Scottish Cup	ESPN+	2018–present		
Association football/Soccer	United Soccer League (USL)	USL Championship	ESPN2; ESPNU; ESPNEWS; ESPN Deportes; ESPN+	2016–present		
Association football/Soccer	United Soccer League (USL)	USL League One	ESPN+	2019–present		
Association football/Soccer	United Soccer League (USL)	USL Cup	ESPN+	2024–present		
Association football/Soccer	Australian Professional Leagues (APL)	A-League Men	ESPN+	2018–present		
Association football/Soccer	Australian Professional Leagues (APL)	A-League Women	ESPN+	2018–present		
Association football/Soccer	CONCACAF	CONCACAF W Champions Cup	ESPN Deportes	2025–present	Spanish-language rights	
Baseball	Major League Baseball (MLB)	MLB on ESPN	ABC; ESPN	2026–present	Broadcast of 30 regular-season games annually on weeknight, including Little League Classic and Memorial Day.	
Baseball	Major League Baseball (MLB)	MLB.TV	ESPN App	2026–present	Exclusive rights holder of MLB.TV making thousands of games available on the ESPN App	
Baseball	Major League Baseball (MLB)	Local rights	ESPN App	2026–present	Exclusive, local in-market streaming rights for six clubs: San Diego Padres, Cleveland Guardians, Seattle Mariners, Minnesota Twins, Arizona Diamondbacks and Colorado Rockies.	
Baseball	Major League Baseball (MLB)	Game of the day	ESPN App	2026–present	ESPN will also deliver more than 150 out-of-market regular season games every season across a special ‘game of the day’ offering for subscribers to the ESPN Unlimited plan.	
Baseball	Caribbean Professional Baseball Confederation (CPBC)	Caribbean Series	ESPN Deportes		Spanish-language rights	
Basketball	FIBA	FIBA Basketball World Cup	ESPN+			
Basketball	FIBA	FIBA Women's Basketball World Cup	ESPN+			
Basketball	FIBA	FIBA Intercontinental Cup	ESPN3			
Basketball	National Basketball Association (NBA)	NBA on ESPN	ESPN	1982–1984, 2002–present	Aired 40 games, primarily on Sunday night, each season between 1982 and 1984.; Wednesday and Friday night games since 2002; both nights currently doubleheaders. Friday games to be reduced to select weeks starting in the 2025–26 season.; NBA All-Star Celebrity Game since 2004	
Basketball	National Basketball Association (NBA)	NBA Christmas Special	ABC; ESPN; ESPN+	2002–present		
Basketball	National Basketball Association (NBA)	NBA Saturday Primetime	ABC; ESPN Deportes; ESPN+	2016–present	Simulcasted on ESPN+ since 2025.	
Basketball	National Basketball Association (NBA)	NBA Sunday Showcase	ABC; ESPN Deportes	2003–present	Doubleheader of Sunday afternoon games from 2003 to 2015. Reduced to single game in 2016. Returned to doubleheader in 2022.	
Basketball	National Basketball Association (NBA)	NBA playoffs and NBA Finals	ABC; ESPN	1983–1984, 2003–present	ESPN aired 10 playoff games in 1983 and 1984, respectively. Since 2003: First round (generally Fridays and selected weekend games); Second round (generally Thursdays, Fridays, and selected weekend games); Full Eastern Conference Finals series (even-numbered years); Full Western Conference Finals series (odd-numbered years); NBA Finals since 2003	
Basketball	National Basketball Association (NBA)	NBA Summer League	ESPN; ESPN+	?–present		
Basketball	National Basketball Association (NBA)	NBA G League	ESPN; ESPN+	?–present		
Basketball	National Basketball Association (NBA)	NBA draft	ABC; ESPN	2003–present	ESPN produces a separate broadcast for ABC since 2021.	
Basketball	Women's National Basketball Association (WNBA)	WNBA on ESPN	ESPN; ESPN2; ESPN3	1997–present		
Basketball	Women's National Basketball Association (WNBA)	WNBA on ABC	ABC	2003–present	WNBA All-Star Game Broadcast on ABC most years since 2003	
Basketball	Women's National Basketball Association (WNBA)	WNBA playoffs and WNBA Finals	ABC; ESPN; ESPN2	1997–present	Exclusive finals rights from 2003 to 2025.	
Basketball	Women's National Basketball Association (WNBA)	WNBA draft	ESPN; ESPN2; ESPNU	2001–present	Primarily broadcast on ESPN since 2020.	
Basketball	Basketball New Zealand	National Basketball League	ESPN3	2020–present		
Basketball	Basketball New Zealand	Tauihi Basketball Aotearoa	ESPN3	2020–present		
Cricket	Cricket West Indies	Super50 Cup	ESPN+			
Cricket	Cricket West Indies	Women's Super50 Cup	ESPN+			
Cricket	Cricket West Indies	West Indies national cricket team	ESPN+			
Cricket	New Zealand Cricket	New Zealand national cricket team				
Cricket	New Zealand Cricket	Super Smash				
Darts	Professional Darts Corporation	World Matchplay	ESPN2; ESPN+	2026–present	Cable-exclusive and streaming rights in the United States	
Darts	Professional Darts Corporation	PDC World Darts Championship	ESPN2; ESPN+	2026–present	Cable-exclusive and streaming rights in the United States	
Darts	Professional Darts Corporation	World Grand Prix	ESPN2; ESPN+	2026–present	Cable-exclusive and streaming rights in the United States	
Darts	Professional Darts Corporation	Grand Slam of Darts	ESPN2; ESPN+	2026–present	Cable-exclusive and streaming rights in the United States	
Darts	Professional Darts Corporation	US Darts Masters	ESPN2; ESPN+	2026–present	Cable-exclusive and streaming rights in the United States	
Golf	PGA Tour	Masters Tournament	ESPN; ESPN+	2008–present	Cable-exclusive and streaming rights; shared with and co-produced by CBS Sports	
Golf	PGA Tour	PGA Championship	ESPN; ESPN+	1982–1990, 2020–present	Cable-exclusive and streaming rights; shared with and co-produced by CBS Sports	
Golf	PGA Tour	PGA Tour Live	ESPN+	2022–present	Includes more than 3500 hours of live and exclusive coverage of 35 PGA Tour tournaments and at least 28 tournaments with four full days of coverage.	
Golf	LPGA	LPGA Tour	ESPN+	2022–present		
Golf	TGL	TGL presented by SoFi	ESPN; ESPN2; ESPN+	2025–present		
Handball	International Handball Federation (IHF)	IHF World Men's Handball Championship	ESPN3; ESPN+	2021, 2023	2021 tournament streamed exclusively on ESPN+. Moved to ESPN3 for 2023 tournament.	
Handball	International Handball Federation (IHF)	IHF World Women's Handball Championship	ESPN3; ESPN+	2021, 2023	2021 tournament streamed exclusively on ESPN+. Moved to ESPN3 for 2023 tournament.	
Ice hockey	National Hockey League (NHL)	NHL on ESPN	ESPN; ESPN2	1979–1983, 1985–1988, 1992–2004, 2021–present	From 1979 to 1983, ESPN's NHL rights were agreements with individual teams.; First national rights contract ran from 1985 to 1988; rights moved to SportsChannel America in 1988.; Regained national rights in 1992.; Re-signed one-year deal in 2004, which ESPN opted out of after the 2004–05 NHL lockout; Regained national rights again in 2021.; Include Stadium Series and All-Star Skills	
Ice hockey	National Hockey League (NHL)	ESPN+ Hockey Night	ESPN+ Hulu	2021–present		
Ice hockey	National Hockey League (NHL)	NHL Power Play	ESPN+	2021–present	Over 1050 out-of-market games, replacing NHL.tv. Game feeds originating from regional sports networks and national Canadian broadcasters.	
Ice hockey	National Hockey League (NHL)	NHL on ABC	ABC; ESPN+	1993–1994, 2000–2004, 2021–present	ESPN produced games and aired games on ABC under a time-buy agreement from 1993 to 1994.; Broadcast rights moved to Fox Sports in 1995.; Reacquired rights in 2000 under the same time-buy agreement.; Broadcast rights left again for NBC Sports after 2004.; Regained rights in 2021, most games air under the banner ABC Hockey Saturday.; Broadcast NHL All-Star Game since 2022	
Ice hockey	National Hockey League (NHL)	Stanley Cup playoffs and Finals	ABC; ESPN; ESPN2; ESPN+	1993–2004, 2022–present	Selected first and second-round games (primarily on days when not airing the NBA; first-round co-exists with regional broadcasts); One exclusive conference finals series per season (ESPN/ABC has the first choice as to which conference to air.); Finals in exclusive to ABC and ESPN+ in even years from 2022 to 2028	
Ice hockey	National Hockey League (NHL)	NHL entry draft	ESPN; ESPN+	2022–present	ESPN only broadcasts first round; second to the last round broadcast by NHL Network. All rounds streamed on ESPN+.	
Ice hockey	IIHF	Ice Hockey World Championships	ESPN+			
Ice hockey	IIHF	IIHF World Junior Championship	ESPN+			
Ice hockey	IIHF	IIHF World U18 Championship	ESPN+			
Lacrosse	Premier Lacrosse League (PLL)	PLL on ESPN; PLL on ESPN+	ABC; ESPN; ESPN2; ESPN+	2022–present	All matches available to stream on ESPN+. Select games broadcast on ABC, ESPN, and ESPN2.	
Lacrosse	Women's Lacrosse League (WLL)			2025–future		
Lacrosse	National Lacrosse League (NLL)		ESPN2; ESPN+	2022–present		
Marathon	N/A	Boston Marathon	ESPN/ESPN+	1997–2004; 2023–present		
Marathon	N/A	New York City Marathon/New York City Half Marathon	ESPN/ESPN+	2012–present		
Marathon	N/A	Houston Marathon	ESPN3/ESPN+	2016–present		
Mixed martial arts	Professional Fighters League (PFL)	PFL on ESPN; PFL on ESPN+	ESPN2; ESPN Deportes; ESPN+	2019–present		
Mixed martial arts	Legacy Fighting Alliance (LFA)		ESPN Deportes; ESPN+	2026–present	Spanish-language rights	
Rugby union	Major League Rugby (MLR)		ESPN2; ESPN+	2025–present		
Sailing	N/A	America's Cup	ESPN; ESPN2; ESPN3; ESPNEWS; ESPN+	1983–2003, 2010, 2024	Initially, ESPN interrupted scheduled programming in 1983 to broadcast the seventh and final race.; Acquired full broadcast rights in 1987, aired races in some form on ESPN and/or ESPN2.; Broadcast rights moved to Outdoor Life Network in 2007.; Reacquired rights in 2010 for ESPN3.; Broadcast rights moved to NBC Sports beginning with the 2013 America's Cup.; Reacquired rights in 2024, races aired on ESPN+ and ESPNEWS.	
Surf	N/A	World Surf League	ESPN+			
Tennis	N/A	Australian Open	ESPN; ESPN2; ESPN Deportes; ESPN+	1984–present	Longest active tenured professional sports property on ESPN.	
Tennis	N/A	U.S. Open	ABC; ESPN; ESPN2; ESPN3; ESPN Deportes; ESPN+	2009–present	Cable-only rights shared with CBS Sports and the Tennis Channel from 2009 to 2014. Full rights since 2015.	
Tennis	N/A	Wimbledon Championships	ABC; ESPN; ESPN2; ESPN3; ESPN Deportes; ESPN+	2003–present	Cable-exclusive rights shared with NBC Sports from 2003 to 2011. Full rights since 2012.	
Volleyball	League One Volleyball (LOVB)	LOVB Pro	ESPN; ESPN2; ESPNU; ESPN+	2025–present	10 matches to be broadcast on ESPN networks and 18 matches streaming on ESPN+.	
Professional wrestling	WWE	WWE Premium Live Events	ESPN DTC; ESPN	2025–present	Package includes the U.S. livestreaming rights to WWE Premium Live Events (at least 10 per year) on ESPN's direct-to-consumer streaming service.; Select events will also broadcast on ESPN's linear networks.; Although originally planned to begin in 2026, the deal began in September 2025 with Wrestlepalooza.	

=== Collegiate sports ===
==== Conference sports ====
Division	Conference	Sport(s)	Release	Notes	Ref(s)
NCAA Division I (D-I)	American Conference	Various Sports	1980–2013 (as Big East); 2013–present		
NCAA Division I (D-I)	America East Conference	Various Sports	1987–present		
NCAA Division I (D-I)	Atlantic 10 Conference (A10)	Various Sports	1997–present		
NCAA Division I (D-I)	Atlantic Coast Conference (ACC)	Various Sports	1979/80–present		
NCAA Division I (D-I)	ASUN Conference (ASUN)	Various Sports	1989–present		
NCAA Division I (D-I)	Big 12 Conference	Various Sports	1997–present		
NCAA Division I (D-I)	Big East Conference	Various Sports	2025–present	Streaming only	
NCAA Division I (D-I)	Big Sky Conference	Various Sports	1989–present		
NCAA Division I (D-I)	Big South Conference	Various Sports	1991–present		
NCAA Division I (D-I)	Big West Conference	Various Sports	Late 80's–present		
NCAA Division I (D-I)	Conference USA (CUSA)	Various Sports	2001–present		
NCAA Division I (D-I)	Horizon League	Various Sports	1988–present		
NCAA Division I (D-I)	Ivy League (Ivy)	Various Sports	1987–present		
NCAA Division I (D-I)	Metro Atlantic Athletic Conference (MAAC)	Various Sports	–present		
NCAA Division I (D-I)	Mid-American Conference (MAC)	Various Sports	2003–present		
NCAA Division I (D-I)	Mid-Eastern Athletic Conference (MEAC)	Various Sports	2005–present		
NCAA Division I (D-I)	Missouri Valley Conference (MVC)	Various Sports	1986–present		
NCAA Division I (D-I)	Northeast Conference (NEC)	Various Sports	1987/88–present		
NCAA Division I (D-I)	Ohio Valley Conference (OVC)	Various Sports	1986–present		
NCAA Division I (D-I)	Patriot League	Various Sports	–present	Streaming only	
NCAA Division I (D-I)	Southeastern Conference (SEC)	Various Sports	1984–present	Cable-only rights shared with CBS Sports from 1996 to 2023. Full rights since 2024.	
NCAA Division I (D-I)	Southern Conference (SoCon)	Various Sports	2001–present		
NCAA Division I (D-I)	Southland Conference	Various Sports	1988–present		
NCAA Division I (D-I)	Southwestern Athletic Conference (SWAC)	Various Sports	–present		
NCAA Division I (D-I)	Sun Belt Conference (SBC)	Various Sports	1979–present		
NCAA Division I (D-I)	West Coast Conference (WCC)	Various Sports	2001–present		
NCAA Division I (D-I)	United Athletic Conference (UAC)	Various Sports	1989/90–present		
NCAA Division I (D-I)	Missouri Valley Football Conference (MVFC)	Football	2015–present		
NCAA Division I (D-I)	ECAC Hockey	Ice Hockey	2021–present		
NCAA Division I (D-I)	Hockey East	Ice Hockey	2022–present		
NCAA Division II (D-II)	Southern Intercollegiate Athletic Conference (SIAC)	Basketball, Football	2021–present		

==== Collegiate tournaments ====
Tournament	Release	Notes	Ref(s)
College Football Playoff (CFP)	2015–present	Initial rights include all New Year's Six bowl games and the National Championship Game.; ESPN exclusive from 2015 to 2024.; Playoff expansion in 2024–25 added four first-round games; games available to air on ABC and ESPN.; Two first-round games sublicensed to TNT Sports beginning in 2024; ESPN retains in-game production control and uses ESPN production crew.; Two quarterfinals games also sublicensed to TNT Sports beginning in 2026.; At least one game per round to air on a broadcast network beginning with the 2026–27 playoff.; National Championship Game to air on ABC beginning in 2027.	
National Invitation Tournament (NIT)			
Women's Basketball Invitation Tournament (WBIT)	2024–present	Entire tournament broadcast on ESPN networks.; Preliminary rounds streamed on ESPN+.; Semifinals broadcast on ESPNU, finals broadcast on ESPN2.	
NCAA Division I baseball tournament College World Series			
NCAA Division II men's basketball tournament			
NCAA Division III men's basketball tournament			
NCAA Division I women's basketball tournament	1985–present	Limited rights of regional finals and semifinals from 1985 to 1995; national championship game broadcast by CBS Sports.; Exclusive rightsholder of the tournament since 1996.; ESPN has broadcast all tournament games since 2003; first and second-round games broadcast regionally from 2003 to 2019.; 2020 tournament cancelled due to the COVID-19 pandemic.; All first and second-round games broadcast nationally without regionalization since 2021.; National championship game broadcast on ABC since 2023.	
NCAA Division II women's basketball tournament			
NCAA Division III women's basketball tournament			
NCAA Beach Volleyball Championship			
NCAA Bowling Championship			
NCAA Division I men's cross country championships			
NCAA Division I women's cross country championships			
NCAA Fencing Championships			
NCAA Division I field hockey tournament			
NCAA Division I Football Championship			
NCAA Division II football championship			
NCAA Division III football championship			
NCAA men's gymnastics championships			
NCAA women's gymnastics tournament			
NCAA Division I men's ice hockey tournament	1980–present		
NCAA women's ice hockey tournament	2001–present		
NCAA Division I Men's Indoor Track and Field Championships			
NCAA Division I Women's Indoor Track and Field Championships			
NCAA Division I men's lacrosse tournament			
NCAA Division I women's lacrosse tournament			
NCAA Division I Men's Outdoor Track and Field Championships			
NCAA Division I Women's Outdoor Track and Field Championships			
NCAA Division I men's soccer tournament			
NCAA Division I women's soccer tournament			
NCAA Division I softball tournament Women's College World Series			
NCAA Division I men's swimming and diving championships			
NCAA Division I Women's Swimming and Diving Championships			
NCAA Division I men's tennis championships			
NCAA Division I women's tennis championships			
NCAA men's volleyball tournament			
NCAA Division I women's volleyball tournament			
NCAA Division II women's volleyball tournament			
NCAA Division III women's volleyball tournament			
NCAA Men's Water Polo Championship			
NCAA Women's Water Polo Championship			
NCAA Division I Men's Wrestling Championships			
NCAA Women's Wrestling Championships			

==== Bowl games ====
ESPN currently holds broadcasting rights for the majority of college football bowl games. Broadcast rights for bowl games are negotiated directly with the bowl game's organizer. All bowl games are aired on either ABC, ESPN, or ESPN2.

Bowl game	Release	Notes	Ref(s)
68 Ventures Bowl	1999–present		
Alamo Bowl	1993–present		
Armed Forces Bowl	2003–present		
Bahamas Bowl	2014–present	Game cancelled in 2020 due to the COVID-19 pandemic.	
Birmingham Bowl	2006–present	Game cancelled in 2020 due to the COVID-19 pandemic.	
Boca Raton Bowl	2014–present		
Celebration Bowl	2015–present	Game cancelled in 2020 due to the COVID-19 pandemic.	
Citrus Bowl	2007–present	ESPN began producing the Citrus Bowl for ABC in 2007.	
Cotton Bowl †	2015–present		
Cure Bowl	2020–present		
Duke's Mayo Bowl	2002–present		
Famous Idaho Potato Bowl	1997–present	Formerly the Humanitarian Bowl and MPC Computers Bowl.	
Fenway Bowl	2022–present		
Fiesta Bowl †	2011–present		
First Responder Bowl	2011–present	Game cancelled in 2018 due to weather conditions.	
Frisco Bowl	2014–present	Formerly the Miami Beach Bowl; Acquired by ESPN Events and relocated to Frisco, Texas in 2017.; Game cancelled in 2020 due to the COVID-19 pandemic.	
GameAbove Sports Bowl	2014–present	Formerly the Quick Lane Bowl.; Game cancelled in 2020 due to the COVID-19 pandemic.	
Gasparilla Bowl	2008–present	Formerly the St. Petersburg Bowl.; Game cancelled in 2020 due to the COVID-19 pandemic.	
Gator Bowl	2011–present		
Hawaii Bowl	2002–present		
Independence Bowl	1982, 1984, 1992–present	Game cancelled in 2020 due to the COVID-19 pandemic.	
LA Bowl	2021–present		
Las Vegas Bowl	1992–present	Game cancelled in 2020 due to the COVID-19 pandemic.	
Liberty Bowl	1982–present		
Military Bowl	2008–present	Game cancelled in 2020 and 2021 due to the COVID-19 pandemic.	
Music City Bowl	1998–present	Game cancelled in 2020 due to the COVID-19 pandemic.	
Myrtle Beach Bowl	2020–present		
New Mexico Bowl	2006–present		
New Orleans Bowl	2001–present		
Orange Bowl †	2011–present		
Peach Bowl †	1992–present		
Pinstripe Bowl	2010–present		
Pop-Tarts Bowl	2001–present		
Rate Bowl	1992–2005, 2010–present	Broadcast rights moved to NFL Network in 2006.; Rights reacquired by ESPN in 2010.; Game cancelled in 2020 due to COVID-19 issues.	
ReliaQuest Bowl	1993–present		
Rose Bowl †	2007–present	ESPN began producing the Rose Bowl for ABC in 2007.; Aired exclusively on ESPN since 2011.	
Salute to Veterans Bowl	2014–present	Formerly the Camellia Bowl.	
Sugar Bowl †	2011–present		
Texas Bowl	2009–present		

†: Indicates a bowl game as part of the College Football Playoff.

==== Other individual games ====
- Turkey Day Classic: 2006–2013, 2016–present online
- NAIA National Football Championship (2014–present)

=== Amateur sports ===
- High School Showcase: Select high school football games, rights purchased à la carte from various state associations (2005–present)
- FA Youth Cup (2018–present)
- Little League World Series (1985–2030)
- Patriot Games (2026): Entire event aired on the ESPN app, with a special later airing on ABC
- Augusta National Women's Amateur
- Asia-Pacific Amateur Championship
- Women's Amateur Asia-Pacific
- Latin America Amateur Championship

== Future rights ==
=== Professional sports ===
Sport	League / Governing Body	Program / Competition	Network(s)	Release	Notes	Ref(s)
Motorsport	Fédération Internationale de l'Automobile	Formula E	ESPN+	2026–future	Exclusive streaming rights in the United States; part of worldwide streaming deal with Disney+	

== Former rights ==
=== Professional sports ===
Sport	League / Governing Body	Program / Competition	Network(s)	Release	Notes	Ref(s)
American football	National Football League (NFL)	ESPN Sunday Night Football	ESPN	1987–2005	Package initially included eight Sunday Night games during the second half of the season from 1987 to 1997.; Full rights acquired by ESPN in 1998; absorbed first half schedule from Turner Sports.; Sunday night package moved to NBC Sports in 2006; ESPN acquired Monday Night Football from ABC.	
American football	United States Football League (USFL)	USFL on ESPN	ESPN	1983–1985	Broadcast games in primetime on Saturdays and Mondays. ESPN offered to broadcast a 22-game slate in 1986, but the league suspended operations instead. The league ultimately ceased to exist.	
American football	XFL	XFL on ESPN	ABC; ESPN; ESPN2; FX	2020, 2023	League suspended operations for two years.; XFL merged with USFL to become the United Football League (UFL); ESPN's XFL broadcast rights absorbed into UFL.	
Arena football	Arena Football League (AFL)	Arena Football League on ESPN	ESPN			
Association football/Soccer	CONMEBOL	Copa América	ESPN+	2019	Broadcast rights acquired and moved to Fox Sports beginning with the 2021 tournament.	
Association football/Soccer	English Football League (EFL)	EFL Championship	ESPN3; ESPN+	2008– 2017–2024	Matches broadcast on ESPN3, before moving to ESPN+. All EFL broadcast rights moved to CBS Sports in 2024.	
Association football/Soccer	English Football League (EFL)	EFL League One	ESPN3; ESPN+	2008– 2017–2024	Matches broadcast on ESPN3, before moving to ESPN+. All EFL broadcast rights moved to CBS Sports in 2024.	
Association football/Soccer	English Football League (EFL)	EFL League Two	ESPN3; ESPN+	2008– 2017–2024	Matches broadcast on ESPN3, before moving to ESPN+. All EFL broadcast rights moved to CBS Sports in 2024.	
Association football/Soccer	English Football League (EFL)	EFL Cup	ESPN3; ESPN+	2008– 2017–2024	Matches broadcast on ESPN3, before moving to ESPN+. All EFL broadcast rights moved to CBS Sports in 2024.	
Association football/Soccer	FIFA	FIFA World Cup	ABC; ESPN; ESPN2	1982, 1986, 1994–2014	ESPN broadcast 7 matches in 1982, and then 15 matches in 1986.; Broadcast rights to most of or the entire tournament from 1994 to 2014, co-produced with ABC Sports from 1994 to 2006.; Full broadcast rights moved to Fox Sports beginning with the 2018 tournament.	
Association football/Soccer	FIFA	FIFA Women's World Cup	ABC; ESPN; ESPN2	1995–2011	ESPN and ESPN2 broadcast six matches in 1995.; Entire 1999 tournament broadcast and co-produced with ABC Sports.; 18 of 32 matches in 2003 tournament aired live on ABC, ESPN, and ESPN2.; Entire 2007 and 2011 tournaments broadcast exclusively on ESPN and ESPN2.; Full broadcast rights moved to Fox Sports beginning with the 2015 tournament.	
Association football/Soccer	Lega Serie A	Serie A	ESPN; ESPN2; ESPNEWS; ESPN Deportes; ESPN+	2007–2010, 2018–2021	An average of nine matches a week stream on ESPN+.; Serie A Match of the Week broadcast on an ESPN linear network (ESPN, ESPN2, or ESPNEWS) with Spanish-language coverage on ESPN Deportes.; All Lega Serie A rights moved to CBS Sports in 2021.	
Association football/Soccer	Lega Serie A	Coppa Italia	ESPN; ESPN2; ESPNEWS; ESPN Deportes; ESPN+	2007–2010, 2018–2021	Final airs on an ESPN linear network (ESPN, ESPN2, or ESPNEWS) with Spanish-language coverage on ESPN Deportes.; All other matches stream on ESPN+.; All Lega Serie A rights moved to CBS Sports in 2021.	
Association football/Soccer	Lega Serie A	Supercoppa Italiana	ESPN; ESPN2; ESPNEWS; ESPN Deportes; ESPN+	2018–2021	Match broadcast on one of the ESPN linear networks (ESPN, ESPN2, or ESPNEWS) with Spanish-language coverage on ESPN Deportes. All Lega Serie A rights moved to CBS Sports in 2021.	
Association football/Soccer	Deutsche Fußball Liga (DFL)	Bundesliga	ABC; ESPN; ESPN2; ESPN Deportes; ESPN+	2020–2026	All matches available to stream on ESPN+.; Select matches broadcast on ABC, ESPN, or ESPN2; select Spanish-language coverage on ESPN Deportes.	
Association football/Soccer	Deutsche Fußball Liga (DFL)	2. Bundesliga	ESPN+	2020–2026		
Association football/Soccer	Deutsche Fußball Liga (DFL)	DFL-Supercup	ESPN+	2020–2025		
Association football/Soccer	Deutsche Fußball Liga (DFL)	DFB-Pokal	ESPN+	2020–present		
Association football/Soccer	Major League Soccer (MLS)	MLS on ESPN	ABC; ESPN; ESPN2; ESPN Deportes; ESPN+	1996–2022	All MLS broadcast rights moved to Apple TV+ in 2023.	
Association football/Soccer	Major League Soccer (MLS)	MLS All-Star Game	ABC; ESPN; ESPN2	1996–2014, 2016, 2018, 2022	All MLS broadcast rights moved to Apple TV+ in 2023.	
Association football/Soccer	Major League Soccer (MLS)	MLS Cup playoffs	ABC; ESPN; ESPN2; ESPNEWS; ESPN Deportes	1996–2022	All MLS broadcast rights moved to Apple TV+ in 2023.	
Association football/Soccer	Major League Soccer (MLS)	MLS Cup	ABC; ESPN	1996–2015, 2017, 2019, 2021	ABC aired MLS Cup from 1996 to 2008.; Moved to ESPN from 2009 to 2015.; Rotated biannually with Fox Sports from 2015 to 2022.; Broadcast on ABC in 2019 and 2021.; All MLS broadcast rights moved to Apple TV+ in 2023.	
Association football/Soccer	Premier League	Premier League on ESPN	ESPN; ESPN2; ESPN3; ESPN Deportes	1996–1998, 2009–2013	Broadcast Monday night matches on ESPN2 from 1996 to 1998.; Re-acquired rights in 2009 initially broadcasting matches in Saturday morning and Monday timeslots.; Sublicensed matches from Fox Sports starting in 2010.; Most matches from 2009 to 2013 aired on ESPN2, ESPN3, and ESPN Deportes with occasional matches on ESPN.; Full rights moved to NBC Sports in 2013.	
Association football/Soccer	Union of European Football Associations (UEFA)	UEFA Champions League	ESPN; ESPN2; ESPN3; ESPN Deportes	1994–2009, 2014–2018	Main rightsholder from 1994 to 2009 with matches broadcast on ESPN and ESPN2.; Broadcast rights acquired by Fox Sports in 2009.; Reacquired select rights in 2014 in a sublicensing agreement with Fox Sports.; Spanish-language coverage on ESPN Deportes and matches on ESPN3 from 2014 to 2018.; Full rights moved to Turner Sports in 2018.	
Association football/Soccer	Union of European Football Associations (UEFA)	UEFA European Championship	ABC; ESPN; ESPN2; ESPN+	2008–2021	Rights moved to Fox Sports beginning with the 2024 tournament.	
Association football/Soccer	Union of European Football Associations (UEFA)	UEFA Women's Championship	ESPN; ESPN2; ESPN3; ESPNU; ESPN Deportes; ESPN+	2013–2022	Rights moved to Fox Sports beginning with the 2025 tournament.	
Association football/Soccer	Union of European Football Associations (UEFA)	UEFA Nations League				
Association football/Soccer	United States Soccer Federation (USSF)	United States men's national soccer team				
Association football/Soccer	United States Soccer Federation (USSF)	United States women's national soccer team				
Australian rules football	Australian Football League			2009–2011		
Baseball	Major League Baseball (MLB)	Sunday Night Baseball	ABC; ESPN; ESPN2	1990–2025		
Baseball	Major League Baseball (MLB)	Monday Night Baseball	ESPN; ESPN2	2006–2021		
Baseball	Major League Baseball (MLB)	Wednesday Night Baseball	ABC; ESPN; ESPN2	1990–2021		
Baseball	Major League Baseball (MLB)	Home Run Derby	ESPN	1993–2025		
Baseball	Major League Baseball (MLB)	Wild Card Series	ABC; ESPN; ESPN2; ESPN Deportes	2014–2025	Formerly the Wild Card Game from 2014 to 2019 and in 2021. ESPN broadcast seven of the eight 2020 Wild Card Series. Exclusive broadcasting rights to the entire Wild Card Series since 2022.	
Baseball	Major League Baseball (MLB)	MLB draft	ESPN; ESPN2; ESPN+	2007–2008, 2020–2025	First ever televised MLB draft in 2007 on ESPN2.; Draft broadcasts moved to MLB Network after 2008. Returned to airing MLB Draft in 2020, broadcasting the entire draft (first round on ESPN, remaining rounds on ESPN2).; Has aired the first round of the draft on ESPN since 2021; remaining rounds broadcast by MLB Network.	
Basketball	N/A	The Basketball Tournament (TBT)	ESPN; ESPN2; ESPNU; ESPN+	2014–2023	Broadcast rights acquired by Fox Sports in 2024.	
Basketball	Euroleague Basketball	EuroLeague	ESPN3	2023–present		
Boxing	Premier Boxing Champions (PBC)	PBC on ESPN		2015–2017	Returned again for 2020 only, based on the Top Rank main feed.	
Boxing	Top Rank	Top Rank Boxing on ESPN; Top Rank Boxing on ESPN+	ESPN; ESPN+	2017–2025		
Canadian football	Canadian Football League (CFL)	CFL on ESPN	ESPN2; ESPN3; ESPNEWS; ESPN+	1994–1997, 2008–2022	ESPN3 only from 2008 to 2013; by virtue in its stake in Canadian broadcaster TSN, the official broadcaster of the CFL, it held internet streaming rights.; ESPN2 and ESPNEWS broadcasts games from 2013 to 2022 with streaming coverage added later on ESPN+.; Rights acquired by CBS Sports Network in 2023.	
Golf	PGA Tour	U.S. Open	ESPN	1982–2014	Cable-exclusive rights, broadcast first and second round of the tournament; Shared with co-produced with ABC Sports from 1982 to 1994, then with NBC Sports from 1995 to 2014.; Full broadcast rights acquired by Fox Sports in 2015.	
Golf	PGA Tour	The Open Championship	ABC; ESPN	1983–2002, 2003–2009, 2010–2015	Cable rights; shared with and co-produced by ABC Sports.; Cable rights moved to Turner Sports in 2003. ABC maintains FTA rights.; Acquired all Open rights in 2010, airing all four rounds on ESPN.; Full broadcast rights acquired and moved to NBC Sports in 2016.	
Ice hockey	National Hockey League (NHL)	World Cup of Hockey	ESPN; ESPN2; ESPNEWS	2016		
Indoor soccer	Major Indoor Soccer League			1985–1987, 2005–2006	Championship games only in 2005 and 2006	
Lacrosse	Women's Professional Lacrosse League (WPLL)		ESPN3; ESPNU	2019	All matches aired on ESPN3 except for final, which aired on ESPNU. League closed in 2020.	
Mixed martial arts	Ultimate Fighting Championship (UFC)	UFC Numbered; UFC Fight Night; UFC on ESPN; UFC on ABC	ABC; ESPN; ESPN2; ESPNEWS; ESPN+	2019–2025	First acquired rights linear broadcast match rights. Later acquired exclusive rights for UFC Numbered PPVs events on ESPN+.	
Motorsport	American Le Mans Series			1999–2013		
Motorsport	Champ Car World Series		ESPN; ESPN2; ESPN Classic	2007	Series merged with IRL, beginning with the 2008 season	
Motorsport	Championship Auto Racing Teams (CART)			1980–2001		
Motorsport	Global Rallycross			2011–2013		
Motorsport	Fédération Internationale de l'Automobile	Formula One (F1)	ABC; ESPN; ESPN2; ESPN+	1984–1997, 2018–2025	Current coverage simulcasted from Sky Sports.	
Motorsport	Fédération Internationale de l'Automobile	FIA Formula 2 Championship				
Motorsport	Fédération Internationale de l'Automobile	FIA Formula 3 Championship				
Motorsport	Fédération Internationale de l'Automobile	F1 Academy				
Motorsport	Fédération Internationale de l'Automobile	Porsche Supercup				
Motorsport	IndyCar Series	IndyCar Series on ESPN	ESPN; ESPN2	1996–2008	Rights moved to Versus Channel in 2009. ESPN continued to produce the broadcasts of five races that aired on ABC through 2018, including the Indianapolis 500.	
Motorsport	IndyCar Series	Indianapolis 500	ABC			
Motorsport	NASCAR	NASCAR on ESPN	ABC; ESPN	1981–2000, 2001–2002, 2007–2014	Contracts with individual races from 1981 to 2000.; Contract with Truck Series only in 2001 and 2002; Contract with NASCAR from 2007 to 2014; ESPN's contract portion moved to NBC Sports in 2015.	
Motorsport	National Hot Rod Association (NHRA)		ESPN	1980–2015	Contracts with individual races from 1980 to 2000; Contract with NHRA from 2001 to 2015; Rights moved to Fox Sports in 2016	
Tennis		Atlanta Open		2010–2017		
Tennis		ATP Finals		2000–2019		
Tennis		Canadian Open		2004–2017		
Tennis		Citi Open		2004–2017		
Tennis		French Open	ESPN; ESPN2; ESPN3	1986–1993, 2002–2015	Cable-exclusive rights acquired in 1986 included five hours of coverage across two weeks broadcast on ESPN; rights to women's and men's final held by NBC Sports.; Rights moved to USA Network in 1994.; Rights re-acquired in 2002; matches aired mainly on ESPN2 with remaining rights still shared with NBC Sports.; Rights acquired by the Tennis Channel in 2006 and sublicensed to ESPN starting with the 2007 tournament; matches aired on ESPN2 and ESPN3.; ESPN relinquished sublicensing agreement after the 2015 tournament.	
Tennis		Indian Wells Masters		?–2007, 2011–2019		
Tennis		Miami Open		1985–2007, 2011–2019		
Tennis		Silicon Valley Classic		2004–2017		
Tennis		Winston-Salem Open		2004–2017		
Thoroughbred racing	N/A	Belmont Stakes	ABC	2006–2010	Broadcast rights returned to NBC Sports in 2011.	
Thoroughbred racing	N/A	Breeders' Cup	ABC; ESPN; ESPN2	2006–2011	Broadcast rights returned to NBC Sports in 2012.	
Wrestling		AWA Championship Wrestling		1985–1990		
Wrestling		Global Wrestling Federation		1991–1994		
Wrestling		UWF Fury Hour		1995		

=== Collegiate sports ===
==== Conference sports ====
Division	Conference	Sport(s)	Network(s)	Release	Notes	Ref(s)
NCAA Division I (D-I)	Big Ten Conference	Basketball		1979–2023	Big Ten signed new contracts with Fox Sports, CBS Sports, and NBC Sports beginning with the 2023–24 NCAA season.	
NCAA Division I (D-I)	Big Ten Conference	Football (FBS)		1979–2022	Big Ten signed new contracts with Fox Sports, CBS Sports, and NBC Sports beginning with the 2023–24 NCAA season.	
NCAA Division I (D-I)	Mountain West Conference (MW)	Football (FBS)			Broadcast rights moved to Fox Sports and CBS Sports in 2020.	
NCAA Division I (D-I)	Pac-12 Conference	Basketball		2012–2024	ESPN did not renew agreement after the 2023–24 NCAA season.	
NCAA Division I (D-I)	Pac-12 Conference	Football (FBS)		2007–2023	ESPN did not renew agreement after the 2023–24 NCAA season.	

==== Individual teams ====
- BYU Cougars football: 2011–2020 (shared with BYU TV; BYU reserves all rights to their events)

== Sources ==
- Miller, James Andrew; Shales, Tom (24 May 2011). Those Guys Have All the Fun: Inside the World of ESPN (First ed.). New York: Little, Brown and Company. ISBN 978-0-316-04300-7.
