= 2026 TGL season =

Golf tournament season

- League: TGL
- Sport: Golf
- Duration: December 28, 2025 – March 25, 2026
- Matches: 15
- Teams: 6
- TV partner: ABC/ESPN/ESPN2
- Streaming partner: ESPN+
- Finals champions: Los Angeles Golf Club
- Runners-up: Jupiter Links Golf Club

Seasons
- ← 2025 2027 →

The 2026 TGL season was the second season of TGL, a simulated indoor golf league that features players from the PGA Tour and employs a match play-style team format. The regular season began on December 28, 2025, and ran through March 3, 2026, followed by single-elimination semifinals matches on March 17 and a best-of-three championship round held between March 23–24. Just as in its first season, six teams competed, and all matches were contested at SoFi Center, located on the campus of Palm Beach State College in Palm Beach Gardens, Florida.

Atlanta Drive were the defending champions, but they were knocked out in the semifinals by Los Angeles.

== Course changes ==
In October 2025, TGL announced "enhancements" to the SoFi Center's virtual and real-world playing areas for its second season:

Hole design

- TGL's technology partner, Full Swing Golf, upgraded game engine software to allow for more realistic improvements to each hole's virtual design environment.
- Each of TGL's six teams were assigned a redesigned hole that virtually depicts backdrops from the real-world cities or regions they represent. For example, Jupiter Links Golf Club will play on a par-5 nicknamed "The Jup Life" that features a depiction of Jupiter, Florida's Jupiter Inlet Light, while Boston Common Golf will play on "Storrowed," a hole framed by Boston's Charles River and Storrow Drive.

ScreenZone surface

- Each of the three trays from where competitors play their tee, fairway, rough, and bunker shots toward the virtual screen were enlarged.
- The bunker tray was also lowered to accommodate "bunker lips" aimed at increasing the difficulty of fairway bunker shots.
- Surface-level towers that track a ball's trajectory and speed were relocated to allow better sight lines for spectators.

GreenZone surface

- Though its turntable remains the same diameter, the putting surface was enlarged from 3,800 sq. ft. to 5,720 sq. ft., a number approximately equal to the average PGA Tour putting surface.
- The number of physical hole locations on the green was increased from 7 to 12.
- One greenside bunker was eliminated, while the remaining two bunkers were enlarged by 50%.
- The turntable's highest point was reduced by 18 inches to allow better views for fans and more natural putting slopes.

== Team rosters ==
TGL features 24 players assigned to one of six teams representing different cities or regions in the United States. The teams and their rosters for 2026 remain unchanged from 2025.

Atlanta Drive GC
(United States) Patrick Cantlay
(United States) Lucas Glover
(United States) Billy Horschel
(United States) Justin Thomas

Boston Common Golf
(United States) Keegan Bradley
(Japan) Hideki Matsuyama
(Northern Ireland) Rory McIlroy
(Australia) Adam Scott

Jupiter Links Golf Club
(United States) Max Homa
(South Korea) Tom Kim
(United States) Kevin Kisner
(United States) Tiger Woods

Los Angeles Golf Club
(England) Tommy Fleetwood
(United States) Collin Morikawa
(England) Justin Rose
(United States) Sahith Theegala

New York Golf Club
(England) Matt Fitzpatrick
(United States) Rickie Fowler
(United States) Xander Schauffele
(United States) Cameron Young

The Bay Golf Club
(Sweden) Ludvig Åberg
(United States) Wyndham Clark
(Republic of Ireland) Shane Lowry
(Australia) Min Woo Lee

== Regular season ==
Date	Team	Result		Team	Broadcast	U.S. viewers (millions)	Rating (18–49)
Dec 28	New York Golf Club	4	6	Atlanta Drive GC	ABC		
Jan 2	Boston Common Golf	7	5	Los Angeles Golf Club	ESPN2		
Jan 6	The Bay Golf Club	4	7	Atlanta Drive GC	ESPN		
Jan 13	Jupiter Links Golf Club	3	8	New York Golf Club	ESPN		
Jan 20	Jupiter Links Golf Club	4	8	Los Angeles Golf Club	ESPN		
Jan 26	Boston Common Golf	9	1	The Bay Golf Club	ESPN2		
Feb 2	Atlanta Drive GC	6	8	Jupiter Links Golf Club	ESPN		
Feb 9	The Bay Golf Club	11	5	Los Angeles Golf Club	ESPN2		
Feb 23	Atlanta Drive GC	5	2	Boston Common Golf	ESPN		
Feb 23	Los Angeles Golf Club	7	3	Atlanta Drive GC	ESPN2		
Feb 24	New York Golf Club	3	5	The Bay Golf Club	ESPN		
Feb 24	Boston Common Golf	9	2	New York Golf Club	ESPN		
Mar 1	Jupiter Links Golf Club	6	7	Boston Common Golf	ESPN		
Mar 2	Los Angeles Golf Club	6	3	New York Golf Club	ESPN2		
Mar 3	The Bay Golf Club	6	9	Jupiter Links Golf Club	ESPN		

== Standings ==
Team	MP	W	L	OTL	Pts	HW
Boston Common Golf	5	4	1	0	8	30
Los Angeles Golf Club	5	3	2	0	6	26
Atlanta Drive GC	5	3	2	0	6	23
Jupiter Links Golf Club	5	2	2	1	5	24
The Bay Golf Club	5	2	3	0	4	23
New York Golf Club	5	1	4	0	2	19

The top four teams in the standings advance to the playoffs.
2 points for a win, 1 point for an OT loss, 0 points for a regulation loss; tiebreaker based on holes won

== Postseason ==
=== Semifinals ===
Date	Match	Team	Result		Team	Broadcast	U.S. viewers (millions)	Rating (18–49)
Mar 17	Semifinal #1	LA Golf Club	6	4	Atlanta Drive GC	ESPN	TBD	TBD
Mar 17	Semifinal #2	Boston Common Golf	5	9	Jupiter Links Golf Club	ESPN	TBD	TBD

Note: Jupiter Links mathematically clinched finals at 9–3 after 13 holes, but a 14th hole was played for prize pool purposes and payouts for 3rd place (between Boston and Atlanta), which Boston won while throwing their final hammer.

=== SoFi Cup Finals ===
Date	Match	Team	Result		Team	Broadcast	U.S. viewers (millions)	Rating (18–49)
Mar 24	Championship Match #1	Jupiter	5	6	LA Golf Club	ESPN2	TBD	TBD
Mar 25	Championship Match #2	Jupiter	2	9	LA Golf Club	ESPN	TBD	TBD
LA Golf Club wins the Finals, 2 matches to 0

== Records ==
- On February 9, 2026, while playing for the Bay Golf Club, Neal Shipley made the first TGL hole in one during his debut match, with the Bay Golf Club going on to win the match 11–5.
- On March 3, 2026, playing for Jupiter Links Golf Club, Tom Kim made the 2nd TGL hole in one during the winner take all regular season finale for the last playoff spot against The Bay Golf Club. After trailing 6–3 with 3 holes to go, Kim's heroics on 14 helped Jupiter take the lead (thanks to their final hammer being used on the tee box, following a won tee box hammer on the previous hole), leading to a 6–9 win for Jupiter when they won the 15th hole on The Bay's tee box hammer.
