= John Collins (sports executive) =

American professional sports executive

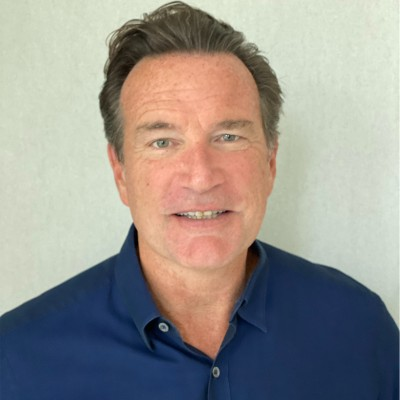

John Collins is an American business executive and investor in sports, entertainment, and technology. He is a co-owner of the National Hockey League’s New York Islanders, a board member and former chief executive of an investment fund that merged with Super Group Holding Company (NYSE: SGHC), and an early investor and adviser to TMRW Sports, a league venture formed by Mike McCarley, Tiger Woods, and Rory McIlroy. Over a career spanning more than three decades, Collins has worked with the National Football League, the National Hockey League, the Cleveland Browns, and On Location Experiences.

== Early career in football ==
Collins spent 15 years with the National Football League, working under commissioners Paul Tagliabue and Roger Goodell, as well as NFL Films founder Steve Sabol. He was responsible for marketing, programming, sponsorship, and sales, and was part of the team that launched NFL Network. Collins also took part in media and sponsorship agreements and league initiatives such as the relaunch of the NFL following the 9/11 cancellations and the 2002 Super Bowl.

From 2004 to 2006, Collins was president and chief executive officer of the Cleveland Browns. He was recruited to the role by owner Randy Lerner, overseeing team operations and business functions during his tenure.

== National Hockey League ==
Collins joined the National Hockey League in November 2006 as chief operating officer, reporting to Commissioner Gary Bettman. During his tenure, the league entered a period of significant financial growth and media expansion. Collins oversaw global business and media initiatives, working closely with the Board of Governors and club executives.

Key agreements negotiated during this period included a $2.2 billion U.S. media rights deal with NBC in 2011, a $5.2 billion rights deal with Rogers Communications in 2013, the largest in league and Canadian sports history, and a $1 billion digital rights partnership with Major League Baseball Advanced Media. He also led a $1 billion licensing arrangement with Fanatics and Adidas.

Collins directed the launch of the NHL Network in the United States and championed event properties such as the Winter Classic, the Stadium Series, and the relaunch of the World Cup of Hockey. He left the league in late 2015 to take the CEO position at On Location Experiences.

== On Location Experiences ==
In December 2015, Collins joined On Location Experiences (OLE) as chief executive officer. The company originated from the NFL’s efforts to expand premium hospitality offerings around major events such as the Super Bowl, the Draft, and international games. Backed by RedBird Capital, Bruin Sports, and later the Carlyle Group, OLE grew rapidly during Collins’s tenure. He expanded the operation from a $35 million, single-event unit to a global experiential hospitality company working on more than 450 events annually across sports, music, and entertainment. By 2019, OLE reported more than $600 million in annual revenues. Collins oversaw the sale of the business to Endeavor in 2020 for approximately $700 million and departed following the transaction.

== Investments and later ventures ==
In January 2022, Collins was chief executive of a $450 million investment fund that merged with Super Group Holding Company. Following the merger, SGHC became a publicly traded digital gaming company. Collins remained on its board of directors for two years before stepping down to invest in the New York Islanders.

In June 2023, Collins invested in the Islanders and UBS Arena, becoming the team’s operating partner and alternate governor. He has participated in ownership decisions, including the search that appointed Mathieu Darche as general manager.

Collins is also an early investor and adviser to TMRW Sports, a league venture formed by Mike McCarley, Tiger Woods, and Rory McIlroy.
