= Brady Center =

Brady Center may refer to:

- Andrew J. Brady Music Center, a music venue in Cincinnati
- Brady Campaign, an American nonprofit gun control organization
