= AEW Summer Blockbuster =

All Elite Wrestling two-part television special

Summer Blockbuster
- Promotions: All Elite Wrestling
- First event: 2025
- Last event: 2026

Summer Blockbuster is an annual professional wrestling television special produced by the American promotion All Elite Wrestling (AEW). The event was established in 2025 and is typically broadcast as special episodes of AEW's weekly television programs Dynamite and Collision.

== History ==
AEW Dynamite, also known as Wednesday Night Dynamite, is the flagship weekly professional wrestling television program of the American company All Elite Wrestling (AEW). AEW Collision, also known as Saturday Night Collision, is AEW's secondary program that premiered in June 2023. On April 15, 2025, AEW filed to trademark "Summer Blockbuster". On April 17, the company announced that Summer Blockbuster would be a television special, airing live as a four-hour marathon of back-to-back special episodes of AEW's weekly television programs, Dynamite and Collision, with both programs airing on TBS and simulcast on Max. Dynamite aired in its usual 8:00 p.m. Eastern Time (ET) slot while Collision, which normally airs on Saturdays on TNT, aired immediately after Dynamite at 10:00 p.m. ET. The event was scheduled for Wednesday, June 11, 2025, at the Theater of the Clouds at Moda Center in Portland, Oregon. During the event, Kazuchika Okada and Kenny Omega signed their contract for their match during the All In pay-per-view.

On April 13, 2026, AEW announced that the 2026 edition of Summer Blockbuster would take place on June 10, 2026 and June 11, 2026 at the Andrew J. Brady Music Center in Cincinnati, Ohio, marking the first time that the event was held on two nights.

== Events ==
Event #		Date	City	Venue	Main event	Ref.
1	Summer Blockbuster (2025)	June 11, 2025	Portland, Oregon	Theater of the Clouds at Moda Center	TayJay (Tay Melo and Anna Jay) vs. Megan Bayne and Penelope Ford	
1	Summer Blockbuster (2025)	June 11, 2025	Portland, Oregon	Theater of the Clouds at Moda Center	The Don Callis Family (Hechicero, Josh Alexander, Konosuke Takeshita and Lance Archer) vs. Daniel Garcia and Paragon (Adam Cole, Kyle O'Reilly and Roderick Strong)	
2	Summer Blockbuster (2026)	June 10, 2026	Cincinnati, Ohio	Andrew J. Brady Music Center	Swerve Strickland vs. Brody King in a Owen Hart Owen Hart Foundation 2026 Men's Tournament semi final match	
2	Summer Blockbuster (2026)	June 11, 2026 (aired June 13)	Cincinnati, Ohio	Andrew J. Brady Music Center	Shane Taylor Promotions (Carlie Bravo, Lee Moriarty, Shane Taylor, Shawn Dean and Trish Adora) vs. Death Riders (Claudio Castagnoli, Daniel Garcia, Jon Moxley, Marina Shafir and Pac)	
