= Cut fastball =

Baseball pitch

An animated diagram of a cutter

In baseball, a cut fastball or cutter is a type of fastball that breaks toward the pitcher's glove-hand side, as it reaches home plate. This pitch is somewhere between a slider and a four-seam fastball, as it is usually thrown faster than a slider but with more movement than a typical fastball. Some pitchers use a cutter to prevent hitters from expecting their regular fastballs. A common technique for throwing a cutter is to use a four-seam fastball grip with the baseball set slightly off center in the hand. A batter hitting a cutter pitch often achieves only soft contact and an easy out due to the pitch's movement keeping the ball away from the bat's sweet spot. The cutter is typically 2–5 mph slower than a pitcher's four-seam fastball. In 2010, the average pitch classified as a cutter by PITCHf/x thrown by a right-handed pitcher was 88.6 mph; the average two-seamer was 90.97 mph.

== Professional practitioners ==
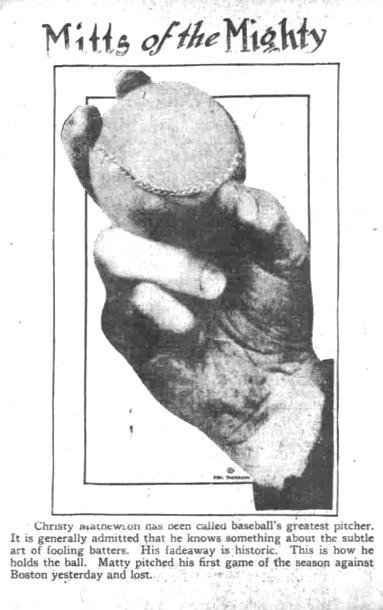
A cut fastball grip from The Day Book in Chicago who credited the pitch to Christy Mathewson.

The New York Yankees' former closer Mariano Rivera, one of the foremost practitioners of the cutter, made the pitch famous after the mid-1990s, though the pitch itself has been around since at least the 1950s.

When the cut fastball is pitched skillfully at speed, particularly against the opposite hand batter (e.g., a right-handed pitcher facing a left-handed hitter), it is quite difficult to hit well. Because of the fact that from the batter's point of view, the pitch looks like a fastball trajectory, the pitch can crack and split a hitter's bat when the pitch breaks inward towards the thinner part of the bat at the last moment, hence the pitch's occasional nickname of "the buzzsaw". Batter Ryan Klesko, then of the Atlanta Braves, broke three bats in a single plate appearance during the 1999 World Series while facing Rivera. To deal with this problem a few switch hitters batted right-handed against the right-handed Rivera—that is, on the "wrong" side, as switch hitters generally bat from the same side of the plate as the pitcher's glove hand.

In 2011, Dan Haren led all major league starting pitchers with nearly 48% of his pitches classified by PITCHf/x as cutters. Roy Halladay was close behind at 45%. Other pitchers who rely (or relied) heavily on a cut fastball include Jon Lester, James Shields, Josh Tomlin, Will Harris, Mark Melancon, Jaime Garcia, Wade Miley, David Robertson, Jerry Reuss, Andy Pettitte, Emmanuel Clase, and Corbin Burnes. Over the course of Kenley Jansen's career from (2010–present) he has thrown his cutter 85.1% of the time, second only to Rivera at 87.2% among pitchers with at least 30 innings during that time period.

In recent years, due to increasing pitcher arsenals, it has become significantly more difficult to classify pitches as cutters, due to its interchangeability with the classification of a hard slider. However, the cutter remains to this day a staple in modern day baseball pitching.

== Popularity and limitations ==
The cutter grew in popularity as certain pitchers, including Dan Haren, looked to compensate for loss of speed in their four-seam fastball. Braves third baseman Chipper Jones attributed the increased dominance of pitchers from 2010–2011 to a more prolific use of the cutter, as did Cleveland Indians pitcher Chris Perez. By 2011, it was commonly being called the "pitch du jour" in the baseball press.

Some pushback has developed against (overuse of) the pitch, due to concerns that a pitcher overusing the cutter could develop arm fatigue. Baltimore Orioles General Manager Dan Duquette instructed prized prospect Dylan Bundy not to throw the pitch in the minor leagues, believing its use could make Bundy's fastball and curve less effective.
