= AEW Fairway to Hell =

All Elite Wrestling television special

Fairway to Hell
- Promotion: All Elite Wrestling
- Date: May 9, 2026
- City: Palm Beach Gardens, Florida
- Venue: SoFi Center
- Attendance: 1,500

AEW Collision special episodes chronology
← Previous; Playoff Palooza	Next → Summer Blockbuster

Fairway to Hell was a professional wrestling television special produced by All Elite Wrestling (AEW). It took place on May 9, 2026 at the SoFi Center in Palm Beach Gardens, Florida and aired live as a special episode of Saturday Night Collision on TBS and HBO Max in the United States.

== Production ==
=== Background ===
AEW Collision is a weekly television program by the American professional wrestling company All Elite Wrestling (AEW). On June 14, 2024, AEW had filed a trademark for the term "Fairway to Hell" for merchandising and golf tournament purposes. During an interview on Barstool Sports' My Mom’s Basement podcast, Tony Khan revealed that the idea behind the trademark was to hold a golf tournament that could raise money for charity while also hopefully bringing new fans to both golf and wrestling.

On April 8, 2026, AEW announced that they would be holding the inaugural Fairway to Hell special at the SoFi Center in Palm Beach Gardens, Florida. The event was also revealed to air as a special episode of Collision.

On April 27, 2026, AEW announced that they would be running several multi-hour TV blocks of Dynamite and Collision back-to-back throughout the month of May. On May 2, 2026, AEW revealed that Fairway to Hell would be a 1-hour special that would air on TBS.

=== Storylines ===
Fairway to Hell featured professional wrestling matches that involved different wrestlers from pre-existing feuds and storylines. Storylines were produced on AEW's weekly television programs, Dynamite and Collision.

== Results ==
No.	Results	Stipulations	Times
1	Mark Davis (with Don Callis) defeated "Jungle" Jack Perry (c) by pinfall	Singles match for the AEW National Championship	14:21
2	Divine Dominion (Megan Bayne and Lena Kross) (c) defeated Rachel Ley and Ruthie Slay	AEW Women's World Tag Team Championship five minute challenge eliminator match	2:17
3	"Speedball" Mike Bailey (with Kevin Knight) defeated Kiran Grey by pinfall	Singles match	1:51
4	Darby Allin (c) defeated Pac by pinfall	No Countout match for the AEW World Championship	20:17
(c) / – the champion(s) heading into the match
