= Sweet spot (sports) =

Maximum effect for a given effort

The sweet spot is a place where a combination of factors results in a maximum response for a given amount of effort. In tennis, squash, racquetball, baseball, cricket or golf a given swing will result in a more powerful hit if the ball strikes the racket, bat or club on the latter's sweet spot.

The sweet spot is the location at which the object being struck, usually a ball, absorbs the maximum amount of the available forward momentum and rebounds away from the racket, bat, club, etc. with a greater velocity than if struck at any other point on the racket, bat or club.

In endurance sports such as cycling, sweet spot training aims to maximise training benefit — generally for performance at or near functional threshold power (FTP) — by optimally balancing training effect, physiological strain and maximum duration.

== Baseball ==
A batted ball with a launch angle between 8 and 32 degrees is quantified as having been hit off the sweet spot of the bat. Balls hit in the sweet spot are not necessarily hit hard with a high exit velocity.

== Cricket ==
The sweet spot of a cricket bat is roughly 150-160mm above the toe. Scientific research conducted at the University of Cambridge discovered that bamboo bats are stronger with a better sweet spot compared to those made of willow.

== See also ==
- Center of percussion
