= Summer Blockbuster (2025) =

2025 professional wrestling event

- Promotional poster featuring various AEW wrestlers
- Promotion: All Elite Wrestling
- Date: June 11, 2025
- City: Portland, Oregon
- Venue: Theater of the Clouds at Moda Center
- Attendance: 3,251

AEW Dynamite special episodes chronology
← Previous; Fyter Fest	Next → Grand Slam Mexico

AEW Collision special episodes chronology
← Previous; Fyter Fest	Next → Collision 100

Summer Blockbuster chronology
← Previous; First	Next → 2026

Summer Blockbuster was a two-part professional wrestling television special produced by All Elite Wrestling (AEW). It aired live on Wednesday, June 11, 2025, at the Theater of the Clouds at Moda Center in Portland, Oregon as a four-hour marathon of back-to-back special episodes of AEW's weekly television programs, Dynamite and Collision. Both aired on TBS and were simulcast on Max in the United States. Dynamite aired in its normal 8:00 p.m. Eastern Time (ET) slot while Collision, which normally airs on Saturdays on TNT, aired immediately after Dynamite at 10:00 p.m. ET.

There were 10 matches: four on Dynamite and six on Collision. In the main event of Summer Blockbuster, which was Collision's main event, The Don Callis Family (Hechicero, Josh Alexander, Konosuke Takeshita, and Lance Archer) defeated Daniel Garcia and Paragon (Adam Cole, Kyle O'Reilly, and Roderick Strong) in an eight-man tag team match. In the main event of Dynamite, TayJay (Tay Melo and Anna Jay) defeated Megan Bayne and Penelope Ford in a tag team match. This was Melo's first AEW match since January 2023, after returning from maternity leave the prior week.

== Production ==
=== Background ===
AEW Dynamite, also known as Wednesday Night Dynamite, is the flagship weekly professional wrestling television program of the American company All Elite Wrestling (AEW). AEW Collision, also known as Saturday Night Collision, is AEW's secondary program that premiered in June 2023. On April 15, 2025, AEW filed to trademark "Summer Blockbuster". On April 17, the company announced that Summer Blockbuster would be a television special, airing live as a four-hour marathon of back-to-back special episodes of AEW's weekly television programs, Dynamite and Collision, with both programs airing on TBS and simulcast on Max. Dynamite aired in its usual 8:00 p.m. Eastern Time (ET) slot while Collision, which normally airs on Saturdays on TNT, aired immediately after Dynamite at 10:00 p.m. ET. The event was scheduled for Wednesday, June 11, 2025, at the Theater of the Clouds at Moda Center in Portland, Oregon.

=== Storylines ===
Summer Blockbuster featured professional wrestling matches that involved different wrestlers from pre-existing scripted feuds and storylines. Storylines were produced on AEW's weekly television programs, Dynamite and Collision.

== Results ==
Dynamite (aired live June 11)
No.	Results	Stipulations	Times
1	Will Ospreay vs. Swerve Strickland (with Prince Nana) ended in a time limit draw	Singles match	30:00
2	Místico defeated Blake Christian (with Lee Johnson) by pinfall	Singles match	4:33
3	The Hurt Syndicate (Bobby Lashley, Shelton Benjamin, and MJF) (with MVP) defeated JetSpeed ("Speedball" Mike Bailey and Kevin Knight) and Máscara Dorada by pinfall	Trios match	9:37
4	TayJay (Tay Melo and Anna Jay) defeated Megan Bayne and Penelope Ford by pinfall	Tag team match	11:01

Collision (aired live June 11 immediately after Dynamite)
No.	Results	Stipulations	Times
1	Kyle Fletcher (with Lance Archer) defeated Anthony Bowens (with Billy Gunn) by pinfall	Singles match	11:30
2	"Timeless" Toni Storm (with Luther) defeated Julia Hart by pinfall	Singles match	8:00
3	The Conglomeration (Mark Briscoe, Tomohiro Ishii, and Willow Nightingale) defeated MxM Collection (Mansoor and Mason Madden) and Taya Valkyrie (with Johnny TV) by pinfall	Mixed trios match	5:15
4	Bandido defeated The Beast Mortos by pinfall	Singles match	10:50
5	Thekla defeated Queen Aminata by submission	Singles match	10:55
6	The Don Callis Family (Hechicero, Josh Alexander, Konosuke Takeshita, and Lance Archer) (with Trent Beretta and Rocky Romero) defeated Daniel Garcia and Paragon (Adam Cole, Kyle O'Reilly, and Roderick Strong) (with Daddy Magic" Matt Menard) by pinfall	Eight-man tag team match	12:10
