= Summer Blockbuster (2026) =

All Elite Wrestling two-part television special

- Promotional poster featuring Jon Moxley, MJF, Thekla, and FTR (Cash Wheeler and Dax Harwood)
- Promotion: All Elite Wrestling
- Date: June 10–11, 2026
- City: Cincinnati, Ohio
- Venue: Andrew J. Brady Music Center
- Attendance: 1,266

Summer Blockbuster chronology
← Previous; 2025	Next → —

AEW special event chronology
← Previous; Fairway to Hell	Next → Beach Break

Summer Blockbuster was a two-part professional wrestling television special produced by All Elite Wrestling (AEW) which took place on June 10 2026 and June 11, 2026 at the Andrew J. Brady Music Center in Cincinnati, Ohio. It aired live on Wednesday, June 10, 2026 as a special episode of Dynamite on TBS and June 13, 2026 on tape delay as a special episode of Collision on TNT. Both parts were also simulcast on HBO Max in the United States.

== Production ==
=== Background ===
AEW Dynamite, also known as Wednesday Night Dynamite, is the flagship weekly professional wrestling television program of the American company All Elite Wrestling (AEW). AEW Collision, also known as Saturday Night Collision, is AEW's secondary program that premiered in June 2023. On April 15, 2025, AEW filed to trademark "Summer Blockbuster". On April 17, the company announced that Summer Blockbuster would be a television special, airing live as a four-hour marathon of back-to-back special episodes of AEW's weekly television programs, Dynamite and Collision, with both programs airing on TBS and simulcast on Max. Dynamite aired in its usual 8:00 p.m. Eastern Time (ET) slot while Collision, which normally airs on Saturdays on TNT, aired immediately after Dynamite at 10:00 p.m. ET. The event was scheduled for Wednesday, June 11, 2025, at the Theater of the Clouds at Moda Center in Portland, Oregon.

On April 13, 2026, AEW announced that the 2026 edition of Summer Blockbuster would take place on June 10, 2026 and June 11, 2026 at the Andrew J. Brady Music Center in Cincinnati, Ohio, marking the first time that the event was held on two nights.

=== Storylines ===
Summer Blockbuster featured professional wrestling matches that involved different wrestlers from pre-existing scripted feuds and storylines. Storylines were produced on AEW's weekly television programs, Dynamite and Collision.

== Results ==
Night 1 - June 10, 2026
No.	Results	Stipulations	Times
1^{D}	Steven Borden and Kiran Grey defeated Rosario Grillo and KM by pinfall	Tag team match	—
2	Jon Moxley (c) defeated Shane Taylor by submission	Singles match for the AEW Continental Championship	13:18
3	Mark Briscoe defeated Pac by pinfall	Singles match	12:12
4	Andrade El Ídolo defeated Orange Cassidy by pinfall	Singles match	15:22
5	Maya World defeated Skye Blue	Women's Owen Hart Cup quarterfinal match	11:22
6	Swerve Strickland (with Prince Nana) defeated Brody King by pinfall	Owen Hart Cup 2026 men's tournament semifinal match	15:00
(c) / – the champion(s) heading into the match; D / – this was a dark match

Night 2 - June 11, 2026 (aired June 13)
No.	Results	Stipulations	Times
1	Kenny Omega defeated Bad Dude Tito by pinfall	Singles match	4:53
2	Hikaru Shida defeated Zayda Steel (with Christopher Daniels by submission	AEW TBS Championship Survival of the Fittest qualifying match	9:54
3	The Rascalz (Dezmond Xavier and Zachary Wentz) defeated Austin Atlas and Aaron Atlas by pinfall	Tag team match	1:40
4	Kevin Knight (c) (with Don Callis) defeated Myron Reed by pinfall	Singles match for the AEW TNT Championship	13:12
5	Athena defeated Tiara James by submission	Singles match	2:17
6	The Dogs (David Finlay and Clark Connors) defeated The Young Bucks (Matt Jackson and Nick Jackson) by pinfall	Tag team match	16:07
7	Persephone defeated Julia Hart by pinfall	AEW TBS Championship Survival of the Fittest qualifying match	9:09
8	Jake Doyle (with Kevin Knight) defeated "Speedball" Mike Bailey by pinfall	Singles match	10:02
9	Death Riders (Jon Moxley, Claudio Castagnoli, Pac, Daniel Garcia, and Marina Shafir) defeated Shane Taylor Promotions (Shane Taylor, Lee Moriarty, Carlie Bravo, Capt. Shawn Dean, and Trish Adora) by pinfall	Cincinnati Street Fight	23:14
(c) / – the champion(s) heading into the match
