= SoFi Center =

Indoor golf facility in Palm Beach Gardens, Florida, U.S.

- Interactive map of SoFi Center
- Address: 2961 RCA Blvd
- Location: Palm Beach Gardens, Florida
- Coordinates: 26°50′15.4824″N 80°4′50.4984″W
- Owner: TMRW Sports
- Capacity: 1,500

Construction
- Groundbreaking: February 2023
- Opened: January 7, 2025

Tenants
- Atlanta Drive GC (TGL) 2025-present Boston Common Golf (TGL) 2025-present Jupiter Links GC (TGL) 2025-present Los Angeles GC (TGL) 2025-present New York GC (TGL) 2025-present The Bay GC (TGL) 2025-present Motor City GC (TGL) 2027-

Website
- Official website

The SoFi Center is an indoor golf facility located in Palm Beach Gardens, Florida. It is located on the campus of Palm Beach State College and is used as the main venue for the TMRW Golf League (TGL). The facility includes a golf simulator and a 1,500-seat arena.

== History ==
In 2022, the PGA Tour, major champions Tiger Woods, Rory McIlroy, and former NBC Sports senior vice president Mike McCarley announced the TMRW Golf League, a three-on-three golf league played on an 18-hole virtual golf course and a special short-game area inside an indoor facility which would include a 97.3-yard (89.0 m) indoor arena with seating for 1,500 people. The TGL broke ground on the venue on February 20, 2023. The venue includes educational and recreational facilities. The construction was overseen by CAA ICON. On October 3, 2023, SoFi, a San Francisco-based financial technology company, signed on as TGL's first commercial partner and acquired the naming rights to the facility.

The facility was originally planned to open in January 2024, but a power failure in November 2023 resulted in the deflation of the air-supported roof, which caused damage to parts of the facility. The damage forced the facility's opening date to be postponed to 2025. Repairs and design changes were made on the venue, including replacing the air-supported roof with a steel roof.
