= 2025 TGL season =

Golf tournament season

- League: TGL
- Sport: Golf
- Duration: January 7 – March 25, 2025
- Matches: 15
- Teams: 6
- TV partner: ESPN/ESPN2
- Streaming partner: ESPN+
- Finals champions: Atlanta Drive GC
- Runners-up: New York Golf Club

Seasons
- 2026 →

The 2025 TGL season was the inaugural season of TGL, a simulated indoor golf league that featured players from the PGA Tour and employed a match play-style team format. The regular season began on January 7 and ran through March 4, with single-elimination semifinal matches on March 17–18 and a best-of-three championship round held between March 24–25. All matches were contested at SoFi Center, located on the campus of Palm Beach State College in Palm Beach Gardens, Florida.

== Team rosters ==
TGL features 24 players assigned to one of six teams representing different cities or regions in the United States.

Atlanta Drive GC
(United States) Patrick Cantlay
(United States) Lucas Glover
(United States) Billy Horschel
(United States) Justin Thomas

Boston Common Golf
(United States) Keegan Bradley
(Japan) Hideki Matsuyama
(Northern Ireland) Rory McIlroy
(Australia) Adam Scott

Jupiter Links Golf Club
(United States) Max Homa
(South Korea) Tom Kim
(United States) Kevin Kisner
(United States) Tiger Woods

Los Angeles Golf Club
(England) Tommy Fleetwood
(United States) Collin Morikawa
(England) Justin Rose
(United States) Sahith Theegala

New York Golf Club
(England) Matt Fitzpatrick
(United States) Rickie Fowler
(United States) Xander Schauffele
(United States) Cameron Young

The Bay Golf Club
(Sweden) Ludvig Åberg
(United States) Wyndham Clark
(Republic of Ireland) Shane Lowry
(Australia) Min Woo Lee

== One-match contracts ==
During the inaugural season of TGL, one-match contracts were signed to feature golfers outside of the team rosters. Tony Finau joined Los Angeles Golf Club during their February 24 match against New York Golf Club. Nick Dunlap joined Atlanta Drive GC for their March 4 match against Jupiter Links Golf Club.

== Regular season ==
| Date | Team | Result | | Team | Broadcast | U.S. viewers (millions) | Rating (18–49) |
|---|---|---|---|---|---|---|---|
| Jan 7 | New York Golf Club | 2 | 9 | The Bay Golf Club | ESPN | 0.919 | 0.30 |
| Jan 14 | Los Angeles Golf Club | 12 | 1 | Jupiter Links Golf Club | ESPN | 1.005 | 0.33 |
| Jan 21 | New York Golf Club | 0 | 4 | Atlanta Drive GC | ESPN | 0.682 | 0.22 |
| Jan 27 | Jupiter Links Golf Club | 4 (OT) | 3 | Boston Common Golf | ESPN | 0.864 | 0.26 |
| Feb 4 | Boston Common Golf | 2 | 6 | Los Angeles Golf Club | ESPN | 0.544 | 0.15 |
| Feb 17 | Atlanta Drive GC | 6 (OT) | 5 | Los Angeles Golf Club | ESPN | N/A | N/A |
| Feb 17 | Atlanta Drive GC | 5 | 6 | The Bay Golf Club | ESPN | N/A | N/A |
| Feb 17 | The Bay Golf Club | 5 | 4 | Boston Common Golf | ESPN2 | 0.357 | 0.12 |
| Feb 18 | Jupiter Links Golf Club | 3 | 10 | New York Golf Club | ESPN | 0.546 | 0.15 |
| Feb 24 | Los Angeles Golf Club | 5 (OT) | 4 | New York Golf Club | ESPN2 | N/A | N/A |
| Feb 24 | Boston Common Golf | 3 | 6 | Atlanta Drive GC | ESPN2 | 0.297 | 0.10 |
| Feb 25 | The Bay Golf Club | 6 | 3 | Jupiter Links Golf Club | ESPN | 0.384 | 0.13 |
| Mar 3 | The Bay Golf Club | 3 | 5 | Los Angeles Golf Club | ESPN2 | N/A | N/A |
| Mar 3 | New York Golf Club | 10 | 6 | Boston Common Golf | ESPN2 | 0.291 | 0.09 |
| Mar 4 | Jupiter Links Golf Club | 1 | 9 | Atlanta Drive GC | ESPN | 0.500 | 0.15 |

== Standings ==
| Team | MP | W | L | OTL | Pts | HW |
|---|---|---|---|---|---|---|
| Los Angeles Golf Club | 5 | 4 | 0 | 1 | 9 | 27 |
| The Bay Golf Club | 5 | 4 | 1 | 0 | 8 | 25 |
| Atlanta Drive GC | 5 | 4 | 1 | 0 | 8 | 21 |
| New York Golf Club | 5 | 2 | 2 | 1 | 5 | 22 |
| Jupiter Links Golf Club | 5 | 1 | 4 | 0 | 2 | 10 |
| Boston Common Golf | 5 | 0 | 4 | 1 | 1 | 16 |

The top four team advanced to the playoffs.
2 points for a win, 1 point for an OT loss, 0 points for a regulation loss; tiebreaker based on holes won

== Postseason ==
=== Semifinals ===
| Date | Match | Team | Result | | Team | Broadcast | U.S. viewers (millions) | Rating (18–49) |
|---|---|---|---|---|---|---|---|---|
| Mar 17 | Semifinal #1 | Los Angeles Golf Club (#1 seed) | 4 | 6 | New York Golf Club (#4 seed) | ESPN2 | TBD | TBD |
| Mar 18 | Semifinal #2 | The Bay Golf Club (#2 seed) | 3 | 9 | Atlanta Drive GC (#3 seed) | ESPN | TBD | TBD |

=== SoFi Cup Finals ===
| Date | Match | Team | Result | | Team | Broadcast | U.S. viewers (millions) | Rating (18–49) |
|---|---|---|---|---|---|---|---|---|
| Mar 24 | Championship Match #1 | New York Golf Club (#4 seed) | 5 | 6 | Atlanta Drive GC (#3 seed) | ESPN2 | TBD | TBD |
| Mar 25 | Championship Match #2 | New York Golf Club (#4 seed) | 3 | 4 | Atlanta Drive GC (#3 seed) | ESPN | TBD | TBD |
Atlanta Drive GC wins the Finals, 2 matches to 0
