= Andrew J. Brady Music Center =

Music venue in Cincinnati, Ohio, United States

Coordinates: 39.096561°N 84.513476°W

- Brady Music Center

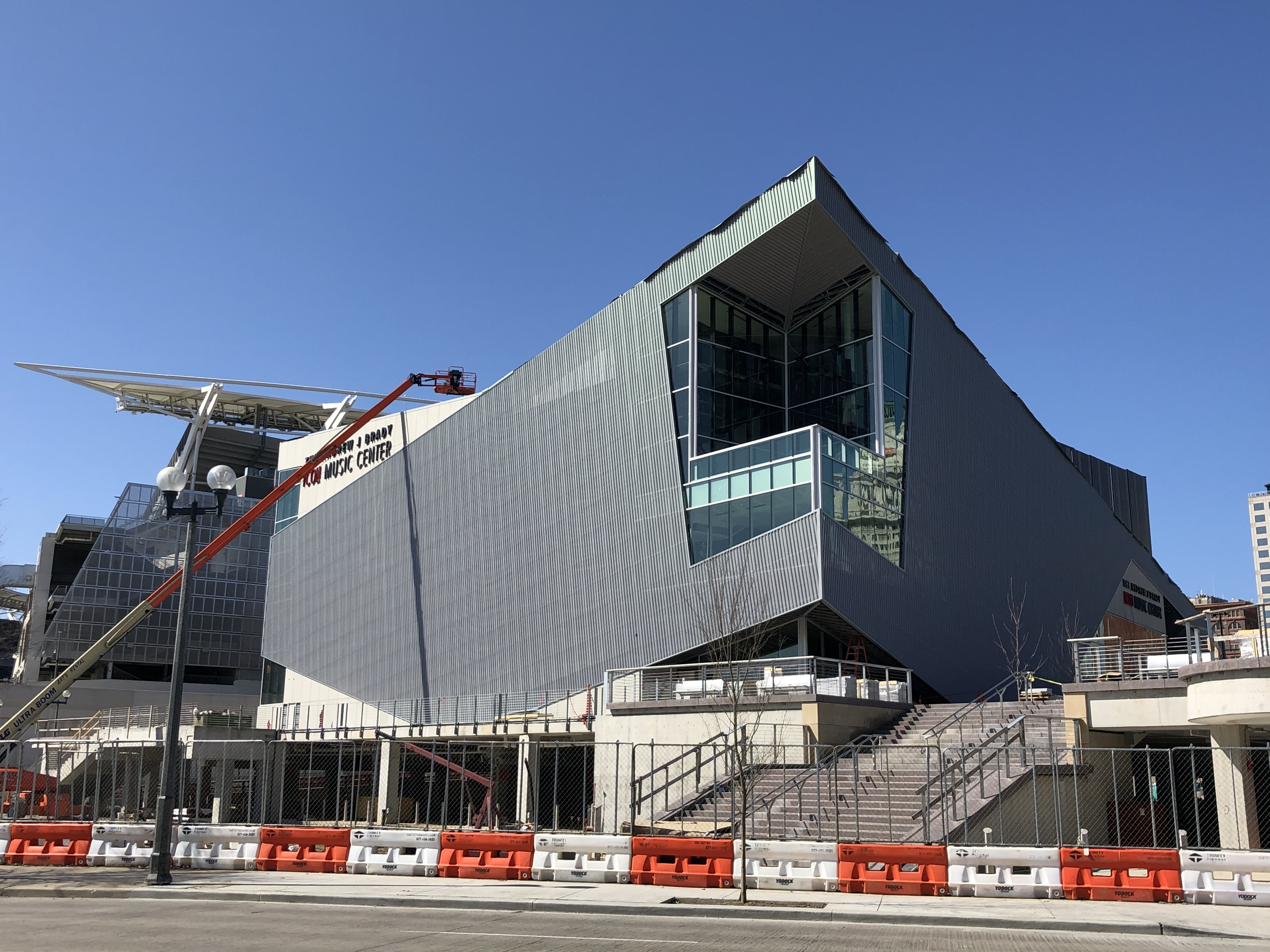
- Interactive map of Andrew J. Brady Music Center
- Address: 25 Race Street
- Location: Cincinnati, Ohio, U.S.
- Owner: Music and Event Management, Inc.
- Capacity: 8,000 outdoor 4,500 indoor
- Type: Outdoor music venue Indoor theater
- Public transit: Connector at The Banks; Metro, TANK; Red Bike

Construction
- Built: 2019–2021
- Opened: July 22, 2021
- Cost: US$27 million

Website
- bradymusiccenter.com

The Andrew J. Brady Music Center is a music venue in Cincinnati, Ohio, located in The Banks neighborhood on the Ohio River. The venue opened in July 2021. The year-round facility includes an outdoor stage for concerts and festivals in the park adjacent to the venue.

== History ==
After months of negotiations, Hamilton County commissioners and Cincinnati City Council approved in November 2019 the finalization of plans to construct a music venue at The Banks, adjacent to Paul Brown Stadium and Smale Riverfront Park. The venue would be built and operated by Music and Event Management, Inc. (MEMI), the nonprofit concert arm of the Cincinnati Symphony Orchestra.

In December 2019, MEMI announced that the under-construction venue would be named the Andrew J. Brady ICON Music Center after Andrew J. Brady, a local musician and music educator. In December 2021, owner MEMI removed ICON from the venue's name "to better elevate" the venue's namesake.

The center's inaugural concerts were held in July 2021, with Kem opening the indoor venue on the 22nd and Foo Fighters as the first headline act for the outdoor festival stage on the 28th.

On January 15, 2025 and January 16, 2025, the venue hosted All Elite Wrestling's Maximum Carnage television special which consisted of a live Dynamite broadcast and a Collision taping. The venue again hosted AEW on June 10, 2026 and June 11, 2026 for their Summer Blockbuster two-night television special.

The venue also hosted an on the road episode of World Wrestling Entertainment's NXT on February 25, 2025.

== Andrew J. Brady ==
The music venue bears the name of a local educator Andrew J. Brady. Born on January 3, 1915, to a musical family in Jonesboro, Arkansas, Brady mastered the trumpet, violin, and piano and began writing and arranging his own music before his teenage years. After a brief stint at Arkansas State University, Brady transferred to the Conservatory of Music in Cincinnati (now known as University of Cincinnati). Brady taught music at the Rothenberg Elementary School in Over-the-Rhine before taking on the position of music director at Western Hills High School. His professional tenure lasted from 1944 to 1976 as an orchestra and band director, known for his Bandwagon variety shows and football halftime shows. Andrew J. Brady died on January 10, 2004.

== See also ==
- The Banks, Cincinnati
