= TGL (golf league) =

American golf league

- Current season, competition or edition: 2026 TGL season
- Sport: Golf
- Founded: August 24, 2022
- Founder: Tiger Woods; Rory McIlroy; Mike McCarley
- First season: 2025 TGL season
- No. of teams: 6
- Country: United States
- Venues: SoFi Center, Palm Beach Gardens, Florida
- Most recent champion: Los Angeles Golf Club
- Broadcasters: ABC; ESPN
- Related competitions: PGA Tour

TGL (TMRW Golf League) is a golf league created by TMRW Sports, a venture formed by sports executive Mike McCarley and professional golfers Tiger Woods and Rory McIlroy in partnership with the PGA Tour. The league employs a combination of traditional golf play with elements of simulated indoor golf, and features players from the PGA Tour. The inaugural season began in 2025, with matches held on weeknights in conjunction and accommodation with the PGA Tour schedule.

== History ==
On August 24, 2022, the PGA Tour, along with Tiger Woods, Rory McIlroy and Mike McCarley, announced the formation of TGL. It initially featured six teams of three PGA Tour players, competing head-to-head in 18-hole match play on a virtual course with a special short game area. Fifteen matches, each lasting two hours and played in prime time on Monday and Tuesday nights, made up the regular season. The semifinals and a final match was held at the end of the season.

TGL announced an expansion team in May 2025. The Motor City Golf Club from Detroit will start play during the 2027 season.

Initial investors included NBA players Stephen Curry, Andre Iguodala, Shaquille O'Neal, Dwyane Wade, Kevin Durant, Formula One driver Lewis Hamilton, soccer player Alex Morgan, MLB players Shohei Ohtani and Mike Trout, Buffalo Bills quarterback Josh Allen, tennis player Serena Williams, and WNBA player Diana Taurasi. Other investors include pop artist Justin Timberlake, Fanatics CEO Michael Rubin, and Liberty Media CEO Greg Maffei.

TGL was originally planned to launch in 2024. It was delayed until 2025 after the host arena under construction was damaged due to a power failure. In October 2024, TGL later announced a revised launch date of January 7, 2025. It was on that January 7 that the first TGL match took place, a 9–2 win by The Bay Golf Club over New York Golf Club, with The Bay's Shane Lowry and Ludvig Åberg respectively recording the league's first tee shot and first hole won (on a birdie) within a 4-minute span of a match that finished in under 2 hours. Nearly one million viewers tuned in to the opening night of TGL, with the audience being younger than traditional golf, as organizers had hoped. Some reviews said the venue was more impressive than the play.

The league's inaugural season concluded in March 2025, with Atlanta Drive GC winning the TGL Championship against New York GC.

== Features and rules ==
=== Match format ===
TGL matches are played across 15 of 30 "holes" designed by Beau Welling Design, Nicklaus Design, and Pizá Golf along with technology partner Full Swing Golf. The virtual holes, which each carry a different nickname and measure as either par 3, 4, or 5, are inspired by various real-world or virtually-inspired landscape and geographic designs (links, canyons, mountains, desert, tropical). The holes' graphics were redesigned for TGL's second season, with each of the 6 teams playing on a customized hole design associated with the city or region they represent (e.g. Boston Common Golf will play on a hole framed by that city's Charles River). The selection of holes and order of play are designated in advance of each match by TGL's competition committee.

Each match is divided into two match play-style segments between two teams, with each team selecting which three of its four players will participate ahead of the first drive:

- Triples (Holes 1–9) - Three players on a team compete in an alternate shot format, with the teams determining who will hit first, second, and third before the match
- Singles (Holes 10–15) - Each player plays 2 holes head-to-head against one player from the opposing team (Player 1 plays Holes 10 & 13, Player 2 plays Holes 11 & 14, and Player 3 plays Holes 12 & 15)

As in traditional match play golf, a team earns one point for reaching the hole in the fewest strokes. No points are awarded if a hole is tied, nor are they carried over to the next hole. For season tiebreaker purposes (see below), all 15 holes in a match are played even if a team's lead is insurmountable.

==== Rules variations ====
- Shot Clock – From the time they place the ball on the ground, players have 40 seconds to hit their shot, a time frame based on the USGA's pace-of-play recommendations and displayed on video screens throughout the venue. A team is administered a one-stroke penalty on the hole if their player fails to hit their shot within the allotted time.
- Timeouts – Each team has four timeouts per match, two during Triples and two during Singles, with no carryover of unused timeouts from one session to the next. A team playing its shot can call a timeout at any point before the shot clock expires, while the opposing team can do so only until the other team's player has addressed the ball. No team can call back-to-back timeouts while on the current shot.
- Hammer – At any point during play, a team can throw a "hammer" (signified by waving or throwing to the ground a gold towel emblazoned with the image of a hammer) to add one point to a hole's value. If the opposing team declines to accept the hammer, they forfeit the hole (acceptance is compulsory if thrown before the start of a hole).
  - During the first five weeks of TGL's inaugural season, matches were limited to one hammer, possessed by one team, who would cede it to their opponents once they used it (first possession was determined by a pre-match coin flip).
  - Beginning with the matches on February 17, 2025, the hammer rule was modified so that each team is given three hammers to spend at their discretion during the match (though only once on any hole); this change was aimed at closing a loophole that allowed a team leading the match to "hoard" the hammer and prevent the trailing team from using it to catch up.
- Overtime – If there is a tie after 15 holes of regulation, a soccer-style shootout is used, with teams alternating chip shots until one team is the first to record the two closest shots to the pin.
- Match referees – An on-course referee is utilized to supervise play, enforce TGL's rules and regulations, and signal any rule violations; another official monitors action from a booth.

=== 2027 season rule changes ===
For the 2027 season, TGL increased their team rosters to five players, as it was originally only four players. This new change allows the teams to be more flexible when choosing their starting three players.

=== Season format ===
Each TGL team plays five total matches in the regular season, once against each of the other teams. A points-based standings system is utilized, with a team earning two points for a win in regulation or overtime, one point for an overtime loss, and zero points for a regulation loss. For any ties in the standings, the number of holes won during the season is the tiebreaker.

At season's end, the top four teams in the single-table standings advance to two single-elimination semifinal matches (1st place versus 4th place and 2nd place versus 3rd). The semifinal winners will compete in the championship round, which is a best two-out-of-three match format.

== Venue ==
For its first TGL venue, TMRW Sports constructed the SoFi Center, an indoor venue in Palm Beach Gardens, Florida, through a partnership with Palm Beach State College. The group broke ground at the venue on February 20, 2023. The venue includes educational and recreational facilities. Construction was overseen by CAA Icon. In November 2023, a storm caused a power failure at the construction site and led to the deflation of SoFi Center's air-supported roof, causing damage to portions of the structure. The damage forced a delay in commencement of TGL play for a full year (from January 2024 to January 2025). In the interim, the facility was redesigned to accommodate a traditional steel roof and other technological improvements. Tiger Woods would call the delay "a blessing in disguise" as it would allow TGL to provide a better playing and viewing experience at SoFi Center.

Measuring approximately 97.3 yards (88.97 m) by 50 yards (45.72 m), or just smaller than an American football field, SoFi Center's playing surface is divided into two halves:

- ScreenZone - Players hit towards a video screen measuring 53 feet (16.15 m) in height by 64 feet (19.51 m) in width and positioned 20-35 yards from two shot boxes (a "front box" for shots 130 yards or less from the hole and a "back box" for shots 131 yards or greater). Rather than synthetic mats, both boxes offer three distinct real-world playing surfaces that are utilized depending on where the shot lands on the screen: Cropped grass for tee and fairway shots, tall grass for playing from the rough, and sand for bunker shots.
- GreenZone - When a shot on the screen lands within approximately 50 yards of the "pin," play transitions to this tech-infused green surface that rotates and adjusts depending on the hole's projected design. The synthetic green and neighboring real-sand bunkers are positioned on a 360-degree rotating turntable measuring 41 yards in diameter. Underneath the surface, about 600 motorized actuators adjust the contours and slope to match the hole's dictated layout. Based on how the ball lies on the screen's "green surface," overhead LED spotlights illuminate the spot on the turntable where the ball must be placed. Originally measuring at 3,800 sq. ft in Season 1, the GreenZone putting surface would be enlarged before Season 2 to 5,720 sq. ft (the approximate average size of a PGA Tour green); physical pin locations were also increased from 7 to 12, while the number of greenside bunkers were reduced from 3 to 2.

== Teams ==
List of TGL teams
Team	Players	City	Owner(s)
Atlanta Drive GC	(United States) Justin Thomas	Atlanta, Georgia	Arthur Blank
Atlanta Drive GC	(United States) Patrick Cantlay	Atlanta, Georgia	Arthur Blank
Atlanta Drive GC	(United States) Billy Horschel	Atlanta, Georgia	Arthur Blank
Atlanta Drive GC	(United States) Lucas Glover	Atlanta, Georgia	Arthur Blank
Boston Common Golf	(Northern Ireland) Rory McIlroy	Boston, Massachusetts	Fenway Sports Group
Boston Common Golf	(Japan) Hideki Matsuyama	Boston, Massachusetts	Fenway Sports Group
Boston Common Golf	(United States) Keegan Bradley	Boston, Massachusetts	Fenway Sports Group
Boston Common Golf	(Australia) Adam Scott	Boston, Massachusetts	Fenway Sports Group
Jupiter Links Golf Club	(United States) Tiger Woods	Jupiter, Florida (Miami metro)	Tiger Woods, David Blitzer
Jupiter Links Golf Club	(United States) Max Homa	Jupiter, Florida (Miami metro)	Tiger Woods, David Blitzer
Jupiter Links Golf Club	(South Korea) Tom Kim	Jupiter, Florida (Miami metro)	Tiger Woods, David Blitzer
Jupiter Links Golf Club	(United States) Kevin Kisner	Jupiter, Florida (Miami metro)	Tiger Woods, David Blitzer
Los Angeles Golf Club	(United States) Collin Morikawa	Los Angeles, California	Alexis Ohanian, Nick Gross, Venus Williams, Serena Williams
Los Angeles Golf Club	(United States) Sahith Theegala	Los Angeles, California	Alexis Ohanian, Nick Gross, Venus Williams, Serena Williams
Los Angeles Golf Club	(England) Justin Rose	Los Angeles, California	Alexis Ohanian, Nick Gross, Venus Williams, Serena Williams
Los Angeles Golf Club	(England) Tommy Fleetwood	Los Angeles, California	Alexis Ohanian, Nick Gross, Venus Williams, Serena Williams
New York Golf Club	(England) Matt Fitzpatrick	New York City, New York	Steve Cohen
New York Golf Club	(United States) Rickie Fowler	New York City, New York	Steve Cohen
New York Golf Club	(United States) Xander Schauffele	New York City, New York	Steve Cohen
New York Golf Club	(United States) Cameron Young	New York City, New York	Steve Cohen
The Bay Golf Club	(Sweden) Ludvig Åberg	San Francisco, California	Marc Lasry, Stephen Curry
The Bay Golf Club	(United States) Wyndham Clark	San Francisco, California	Marc Lasry, Stephen Curry
The Bay Golf Club	(Australia) Min Woo Lee	San Francisco, California	Marc Lasry, Stephen Curry
The Bay Golf Club	(Republic of Ireland) Shane Lowry	San Francisco, California	Marc Lasry, Stephen Curry
Motor City Golf Club	(United States) Brooks Koepka	Detroit, Michigan	Sheila Ford Hamp, Steve Hamp, Michael Hamp, Rob Walton, Jordan Rose, Middle West Partners
Motor City Golf Club	TBD	Detroit, Michigan	Sheila Ford Hamp, Steve Hamp, Michael Hamp, Rob Walton, Jordan Rose, Middle West Partners
Motor City Golf Club	TBD	Detroit, Michigan	Sheila Ford Hamp, Steve Hamp, Michael Hamp, Rob Walton, Jordan Rose, Middle West Partners
Motor City Golf Club	TBD	Detroit, Michigan	Sheila Ford Hamp, Steve Hamp, Michael Hamp, Rob Walton, Jordan Rose, Middle West Partners

== Specific team information ==
=== Motor City Golf Club ===
Motor City Golf Club, which is a new team for the 2027 season, already announced one of their players which was Brooks Koepka. The expansion team is Brooks Koepka, Jackson Koivun, Jake Knapp, Si Woo Kim, and Bud Cauley.

== Roster ==
Tiger Woods, Rory McIlroy, Justin Thomas and Jon Rahm were the first four golfers to commit to compete in the league. Twenty more players have since signed on leaving the roster set at twenty-four.

Rahm withdrew from the league in November 2023, shortly before joining LIV Golf. In January 2024, Tyrrell Hatton also joined LIV Golf after negotiating his exit from TGL. In June 2024 it was announced that Hatton would be replaced by Hideki Matsuyama.

- (Sweden) Ludvig Åberg
- (United States) Keegan Bradley
- (United States) Patrick Cantlay
- (United States) Wyndham Clark
- (England) Matt Fitzpatrick
- (England) Tommy Fleetwood
- (United States) Rickie Fowler
- (United States) Lucas Glover
- (United States) Max Homa
- (United States) Billy Horschel
- (South Korea) Tom Kim
- (United States) Kevin Kisner
- (Australia) Min Woo Lee
- (Republic of Ireland) Shane Lowry
- (Japan) Hideki Matsuyama
- (Northern Ireland) Rory McIlroy
- (United States) Collin Morikawa
- (England) Justin Rose
- (United States) Xander Schauffele
- (Australia) Adam Scott
- (United States) Sahith Theegala
- (United States) Justin Thomas
- (United States) Tiger Woods
- (United States) Cameron Young

=== 2027 Roster Additions/Changes ===
There are several new faces on TGL for the 2027 season. Atlanta Drive GC added Micheal Brennan, Los Angeles Golf Club added Ben James, and The Bay Golf Club added Ryan Fox and Blades Brown after trading Shane Lowry to Boston Common Golf. Jupiter Links GC added Keith Mitchell, while New York Golf Club added Ben Griffin and Alex Fitzpatrick. These new faces help bring talent to each team allowing for increased competition.

== Broadcasting ==
No broadcaster for TGL was announced during the league's unveiling. An August 2022 report by Sports Business Journal indicated that NBC Sports had an option to carry league events. On October 5, 2023, ESPN Inc. announced it had secured media rights for the league in a "multi-year" deal, with all matches airing on ESPN or ESPN2, and streaming on ESPN+. TGL matches, especially those early in its first season, receive promotional pushes from major events on the network including the NFL and college football playoffs. As an indication of this push, the first match for Jupiter Links Golf Club, which features Tiger Woods, was intentionally set as not the first match in TGL history (on January 7) but the second (on January 14) so that it could receive promotional exposure during ESPN's NFL Wild Card Game coverage the night before (January 13). The first-year ESPN schedule included a Presidents' Day triple-header, with two afternoon matches on ESPN and a nightcap on ESPN2.

ESPN's TGL broadcasts feature Scott Van Pelt as host from his SportsCenter studio in Washington, with the exception of the SoFi Cup Finals, where he hosts it and SportsCenter on-site at SoFi Center in Palm Beach Gardens, Matt Barrie calling the play, with Marty Smith conducting sideline reports, and analysis from Roberto Castro. Additionally, broadcasts feature live-mic comments from players and caddies in the match and interviews with figures such as Woods and Rory McIlroy, when they weren't playing. Additionally, broadcasts feature various overhead, course-level, and bunker cameras. The SmartPin Cam used during TGL broadcasts received a Cynopsis Sports Media Award for Best Digital Innovation/Technology.
