= Mike McCarley =

American media executive

Mike McCarley is an American media executive and the founder and CEO of TMRW Sports, a company which he founded with Tiger Woods and Rory McIlroy. In a 20-plus year career working closely with various sports organizations on many of the biggest events in sports including the NFL, Olympics, Kentucky Derby, golf and many others, developed a track record of amassing some of the largest audiences in television history. Previously, he was president of golf and global strategy for the NBC Sports Group after leading marketing for NBC's Olympics and Sunday Night Football franchises. He is a protégé of former NBC Sports & Olympics Chairman Dick Ebersol and has had close connections to several sports icons, including the late Arnold Palmer, Jim McKay, John Madden and golf superstars Tiger Woods, Rory McIlroy and Rickie Fowler.

== TMRW Sports and TGL ==
TMRW Sports (pronounced "tomorrow sports") was founded by McCarley in August 2022 in partnership with professional golfers Tiger Woods and Rory McIlroy. The organization's first project, TGL, is a virtual golf league in partnership with the PGA Tour and broadcast on ESPN.

== Golf Channel ==
Under McCarley's leadership, Golf Channel expanded beyond its origins as a television network.

According to Forbes, in 2017 and 2018, "Golf Channel seems to continuously evolve as a new media technology platform" and "Golf Channel is far more than a 24-hour television network devoted to golf. "It's a technology company more than anything," he said. Golf Channel has embraced golf businesses that have little, if anything, to do with television. When McCarley started (in 2011), Golf Channel had 330 employees. Today it has close to 1,200. Golf Channel has jobs today that did not exist a few years ago. "We like to talk about being at the intersection of golf and technology." He described the Golf Channel culture as more entrepreneurial, which helps employees embrace change more than others.

McCarley's leadership style is collaborative and he has been recognized for creating a positive culture inside the company. "Most people who work here would be able to tell you why the things that they do every day matter, and why they help the company succeed. You feel like you're part of a team. And when the team wins, you win," said McCarley.

The Golf Channel has pivoted to projects outside of its TV properties. It has made 21 acquisitions over the past decade to fuel that diversification. Steve Case, AOL founder who now runs investment company Revolution, made Orlando his first stop of his 8th Rise of the Rest bus tour, which aims to showcase startups and industries in cities that are often overlooked by venture capitalists. When addressing the GOLF Channel leadership team, Case said, "Smartly, (you) said 'OK, we could just continue to do that but how do we imagine a broader platform – a bigger brand, a broader company?' – and having now a whole slew of products and services is a great example of the reinvention that's required." However, what's even more impressive, according to Case, was that GOLF kept the entrepreneurial spirit intact.

In February 2019, McCarley was joined by McIlroy on CNBC's Squawk Box program to announce GOLFPASS, a new joint venture subscription service. The National Golf Foundation described McCarley as overseeing "all of NBC Sports' golf-related businesses and content" – an ever-growing portfolio. McIlroy told the Australian Financial Review upon launching the GolfPass direct-to-consumer service with McCarley and NBC, "I want to work with good people, with people who have similar values to what I have."

Golf Channel came under the umbrella of NBC Universal when its owner, Comcast, acquired control of NBCU on January 28, 2011. On February 2, NBC Sports Group announced that McCarley would take the reins as Golf Channel president. McCarley said his mandate was to integrate and grow the golf assets of the newly combined company, which includes NBC and digital tee-time booker GolfNow.

In 2011 Golf Channel started a trend of several years of growth, setting viewership records every year from 2011 to 2014. In 2012 Golf Channel became the fastest-growing network on U.S. television among networks serving 80 million or more homes, according to the Nielsen Company. Also in 2012, Golf Channel launched programming for the first time in India and other markets across South Asia. Today Golf Channel is available to nearly 500 million viewers in more than 80 countries and nine languages around the world.

In addition to increased viewership, McCarley steered continued growth by adding younger-skewing programming, partnering with the NCAA for the college golf championship and Augusta National Golf Club, home of the Masters, for the Drive, Chip and Putt Championship for children and extending the flagship "Morning Drive" program to seven days a week with a broader focus to include the lifestyle of golf and increased the focus on quality. The network received the most Emmy nominations in its history in 2014. McCarley said Golf will invest in more high-quality originals that will keep its viewers returning.

In a landmark, 12-year agreement in 2015, NBC and Golf Channel won the rights to televise the British Open, which had been held by ABC for more than 50 years and became the first major golf championship on Golf Channel. In 2018, the audience for the British Open topped the audience for the U.S. Open for the first time in history and was the most-watched British Open in 18 years.

Technology subsidiary GolfNow, expanded to Europe and opened new headquarters in Belfast. According to the Belfast Telegraph, its Belfast city offices now house 71 staff.

In 2018, the network announced a partnership with St. Andrews Links and its seven golf courses, including the Old Course where golf has been played since the 1400s.

In November 2019, the NBC Sports Group acquired EZLinks Golf, the parent company of TeeOff.com. The merger means that tee time booking industry titans GolfNow and Teeoff.com are now under the same umbrella.

In March 2020 NBC Sports struck a new nine-year deal with the PGA Tour, the organizer of the main professional men's golf tours in the United States.

Also in 2020 mid-COVID-19 pandemic, NBC completed "one of the most complicated TV Deals in golf history" requiring rights to the U.S. Open from Fox.

Arnold Palmer Relationship

McCarley was careful to maintain Golf Channel co-founder Arnold Palmer's original vision when leading the business through years of unprecedented growth, Golfweek noted in the days following Palmer's passing. "Palmer became an adviser and confidante of Mike McCarley…who was less than half of Palmer's age. McCarley has said that he leaned on Palmer for insight about how the golf industry has evolved, in hopes of gleaning lessons to direct Golf Channel's future course. He often paid homage and invoked Palmer's influence even as the media company moved into new business ventures and expanded.

A Sports Business Journal profile said, "McCarley doesn't talk about ratings, ad sales or the new shows he's overseen. Rather, he talks about Arnold Palmer. The relationship McCarley has forged with Palmer is indicative of how the network executive operates in the business."

As Golf Channel renovated its offices, the network created more ties to its founder. The Associated Press listed several at the time of Palmer's passing.

Arnold Palmer still had a parking spot outside his old office at Golf Channel, the network he co-founded more than two decades ago. Hours after the golfing great died at age 87, the space was filled with flowers, candles and pictures as rain poured down on the makeshift memorial at the Orlando, Florida, headquarters.

== NBC ==
McCarley started at NBC in 2000, as communications director for its Olympic division. He is credited as the architect of the network's "big event strategy", which evolved into NBC Universal's promotional initiative known as "Symphony", and has resulted in record television audiences for a variety of sports events, including the Olympics, NFL, Kentucky Derby and NHL. He is also credited with NBC's successful "Sunday Night Is Football Night" campaign.

In 2006, after several roles working with numerous sports leagues, McCarley was elevated to senior vice president, strategic marketing, promotion and communications, adding oversight of all NBC Sports advertising and promotions. McCarley had been considering leaving NBC to get a masters of business, but Ebersol "frowned and said, 'Stay here and get your MBA from me."

The Wall Street Journal reported that, "Promotion, in the world of McCarley's mentor, NBC Sports Group Chairman Dick Ebersol, is not just fluff, it's key to the master plan."

=== NFL ===
Under McCarley in 2010, Sunday Night Football became the only regularly scheduled sports program of any kind to be the No. 1 primetime program of the television season in 2010, a statistic that has continued ever since and in 2018 became the longest-running No. 1 primetime television program.

He told Sports Business Daily that he knew his football campaign was a success when he heard his mother-in-law imitate Al Roker's weather forecast for Sunday games. Super Bowl XLIII (2009) became the most-watched single program in U.S. television history with a record 152 million viewers.

=== Olympics ===
==== Beijing 2008 ====
In August 2008, McCarley was promoted to senior vice president following NBC's coverage of the Beijing Olympics. On all 17 nights of the games, NBC had more viewers than ABC, CBS, and FOX combined. The Beijing Games became the most watched U.S. television event of all time, with 215 million viewers.

==== Vancouver 2010 ====
The Vancouver Winter Olympics was the second most-watched Winter Olympics in history with 190 million viewers, following the "tabloid-fueled" 1994 Lillehammer Games and the only show to ever beat American Idol in ratings.

== Accomplishments ==
McCarley was named to the elite Sports Business Journal "40 under 40" Hall of Fame in 2013 after selections in 2009, and 2010.

In 2012, he was named Sports Network Executive of the Year by Cynopsis Sports, noting that in his first year he'd led The Golf Channel to the most-watched year of its 17-year history in 2011 and the first of several years when the channel was the fastest growing network on American television. McCarley is regularly listed as one of the most powerful people in golf. Multichannel News named him one of the "Forty Under 40" in 2013 and CableFAX has named him one of its Top 100 power players for cable programming since 2012.

McCarley was coordinating producer for the 2009 NHL Winter Classic's promotional campaign, which won the first-ever Emmy Award for sports promotion combining winter images of Wrigley Field with Harry Caray's rendition of "Take Me Out to the Ballgame." The 2011 Classic was the most watched NHL contest in the United States since 1996.

In 2025, he received the Trailblazer Award from Cynopsis Sports for his creation of the virtual golf league TGL, TMRW Sports first major project.

== Personal ==
McCarley is a native of Memphis, Tennessee and a graduate of the University of Arizona.
