= Golf simulator =

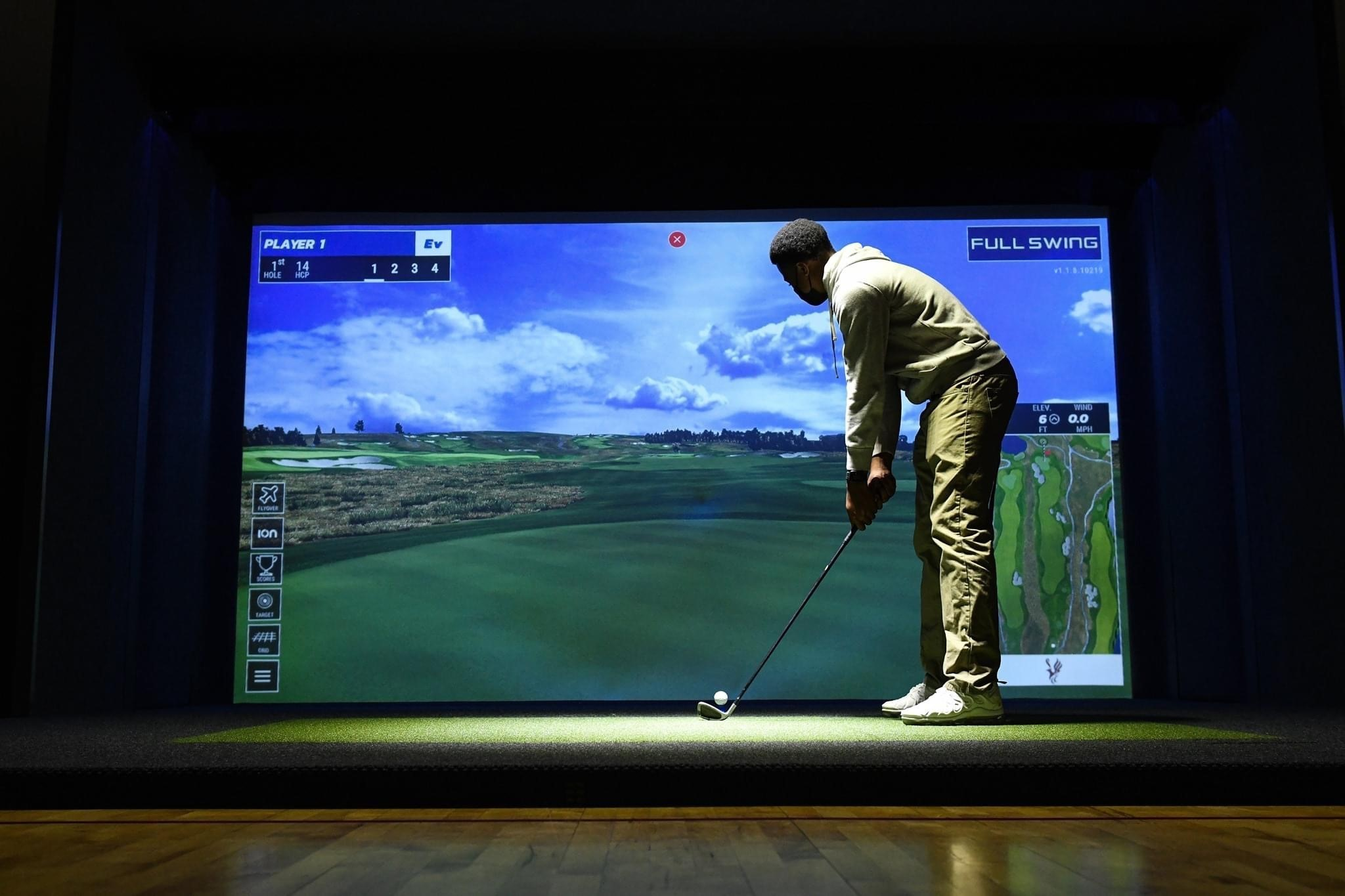
Projector-based golf simulator

A golf simulator is an indoor electronic simulator that allows to hit a physical golf ball into a projection screen. The system uses the measured data to calculate the ball's flight and display it on the screen. Depending on the system, measurements may include clubhead speed, ball speed, launch angle, spin rate, club path, and carry distance. The data is used to calculate the relationships to the ball's flight performance, by adding environmental aspects, including terrain, wind, rain and other such influences or obstacles. Modern golf simulators are used for golf practice, instruction, club fitting, and entertainment.

== Training facilities ==
=== Indoor driving range ===
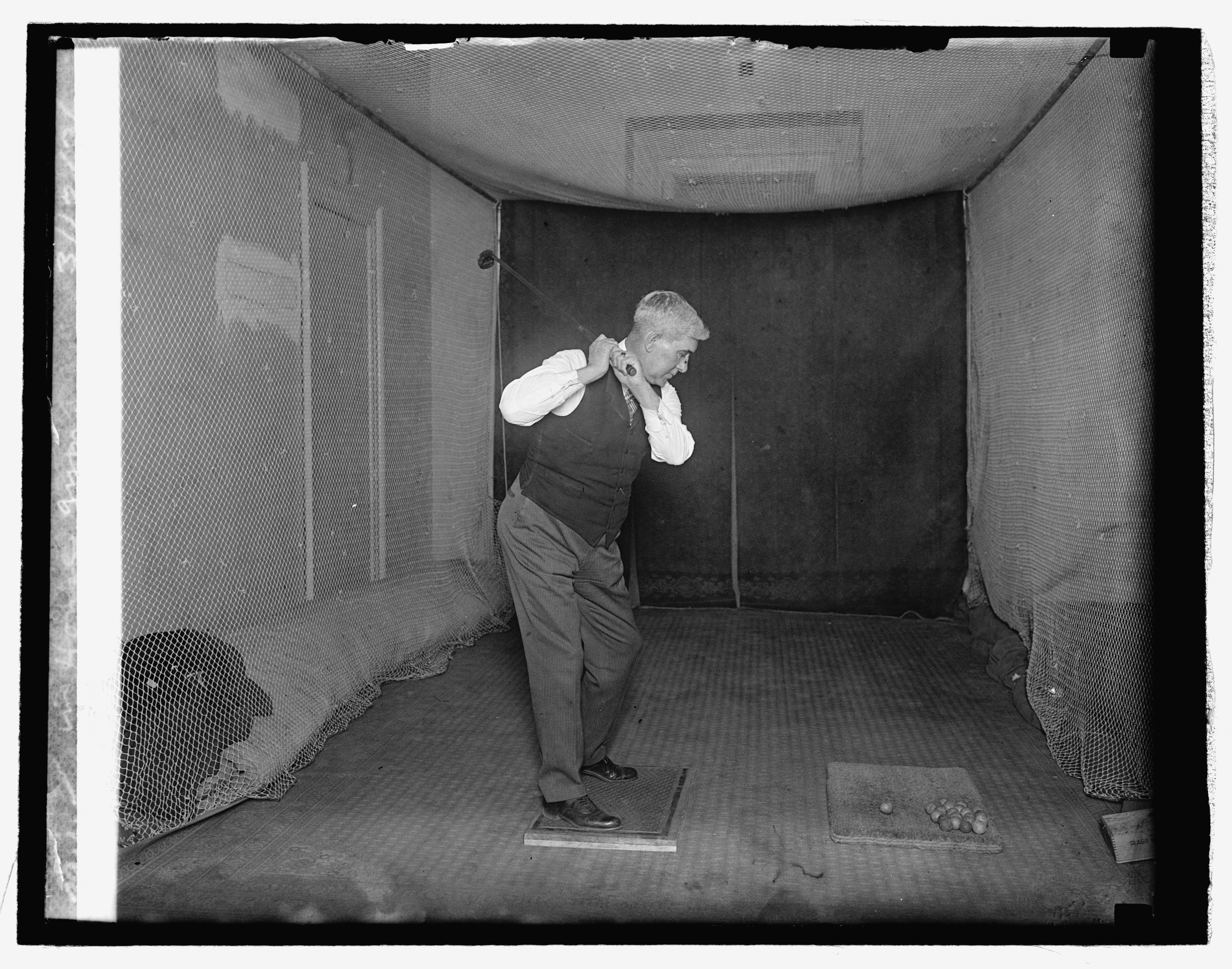
Albert Henry Vestal in an indoor golf driving range. (1926)

An indoor driving range can be a low-ceiling structure in which players hit golfballs into a net at close range, or a large high-ceiling dome, where players are better able to observe the trajectory of the golfball in flight. Because of the nature of being indoors, these structures provide players with the opportunity to practice regardless of the outside conditions. Teaching professionals and computer/video evaluation tools may also be available at these ranges, as well as specialized areas for putting, chipping, and sand shots.

== Electronic golf simulator ==
An electronic golf simulator allows golf to be played on a graphically or photographically simulated driving range or golf course, usually in an indoor setting. It is a technical system used by some golfers to continue their sport regardless of weather and time of day in a converted premises. Simulators have been available since the early 1970s, and systems range in cost from compact units costing well under $200 that work with a computer or video game console, to sophisticated ones costing tens of thousands of dollars. Advanced systems may utilize a dedicated room, hitting screen, projector and other paraphernalia.

Simpler simulators typically do not possess built-in software, but measure the movement of the hand-held sensor and feeds the information to the video game. The information received is then translated into an action of some sort, usually hitting the ball. More advanced simulators often come with their own software, allowing the user to use the system as if they were on a driving range. Relying on a battery of environmental sensors, the software tracks each shot and represents the entire shot, from impact to how the ball bounces visually on screen. In this way, the golfer has a detailed analysis of the entire flight of the ball which can be used for practice or training.

It utilizes a projected landscape, sometimes with natural images. A computer calculates the expected trajectory of the golf ball from data gathered on the swing, and the image of the golf ball flight is then simulated on the screen via a projector. Golf simulators need to present club speed, club path, club face angle at impact, ball speed, ball path, horizontal and vertical launch angle and spin. There are several types of measurement system used in golf simulation to achieve this, such as simulator mats, sonic sound systems, optical sensor arrays, radar and camera ball tracking systems. Golf simulators are increasingly used in commercial entertainment venues where they are integrated with food, beverage, and social gaming environments to provide year-round recreational experiences.

=== Simulator mats ===
Many golf simulator systems use a sensor mat, which is essentially a rectangular mat containing several infrared sensors and microchips that can monitor the speed of the club as it passes the back sensor, the angle of the club and club speed as the ball and club pass the second sensor following impact and the direction of the ball as the club passes the third sensor. Such systems are used by GolfBlaster3D, ProTee United, Dancin' Dogg by Optishot, TruGolf and Unex Golf.

=== Sonic sound systems ===
A sonic system uses strategically placed microphones around the impact screen. The system measures and compares the intensity of sound that is produced by the ball hitting the screen. Using 3 or more directional microphones and an interface that can measure the sound amplitude of the impact from each microphone, an XY impact position can be determined. This type of measurement system is rarely used in modern simulators.

=== Radar systems ===
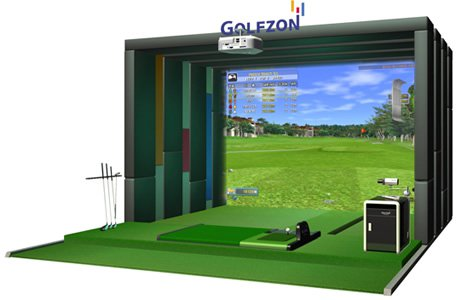
Projector-based golf simulator

A radar sits aside the player to gather launch data. They emit a microwave that reflects off any moving object which returns to the sensor. The system can then record trajectory, launch angle, speed and direction. Additional physics is applied to these figures to calculate spin, axis and tilt. These types of system can be used indoors or outdoors. They are very useful as launch monitors, and they work very effectively. Several professionals make use of them to analyse their game in real environments. Typical examples are available from TrackMan and Flightscope.

=== Optical sensor systems ===
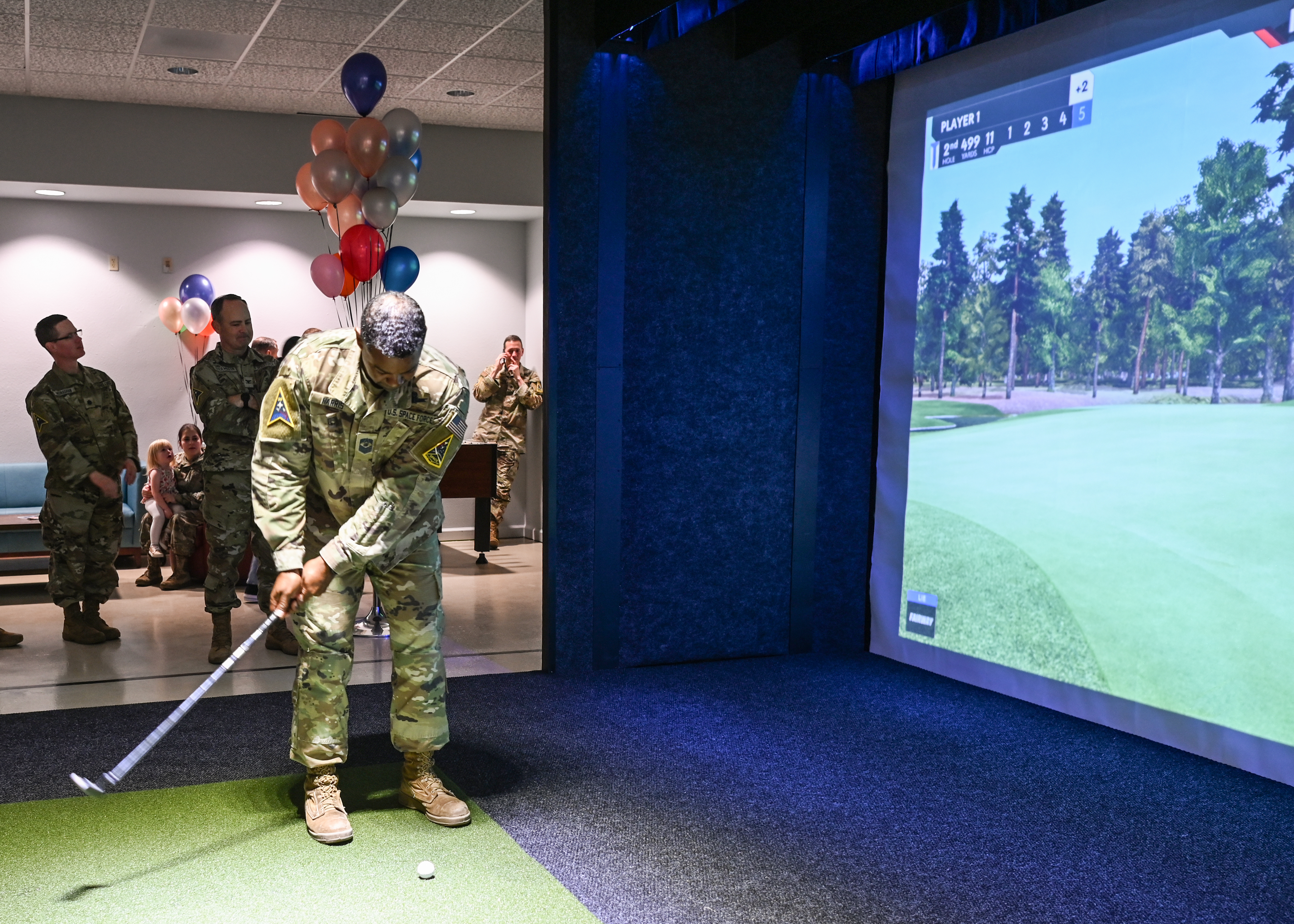
United States Space Force personnel using a virtual golfing simulator to putt.

This method uses two banks of Infra Red sensors that scan across the bay in both X and Y directions. The ball passes through the first set of sensors and its XY coordinate is captured. The ball then passes another set of sensors and the second XY coordinates are captured again. The two co-ordinates are then compared to determine the vertical launch angle, ball path and speed. The system is very accurate, but very expensive to construct, as you need hundreds of optical sensors and emitters to catch the coordinates of the ball in both sensor positions. The main disadvantage is that the ball must always pass through both sensors with a fast shot so that there is no downward curve in the ball's trajectory before hitting the screen. That means that chipping and putting will not work too well.

=== Camera systems ===
Cameras are becoming the norm in golf simulation. In general, one, two, three or four cameras are used that continuously monitor the play area. The downward swing path, impact, club face angle, launch angle and ball speed are all captured by the high speed cameras, normally running at around 100 to 120 frames per second. Camera data is processed using complex physics algorithms to produce a multitude of data such as back spin, side spin, trajectory, club face angle, swing path, loft, distance, carry and roll. The, most common types of camera measurement system are Triggered and Continuous. With triggered systems, Images are taken only after the club has passed through a trigger point to activate the camera. With continuous systems, the camera records permanently, and data is processed once impact with the ball is observed. Continuous cameras must be capable of frame rates in excess of 100 frames per second per camera. Such systems are used by Bogolf, Visual Sports, Sports Coach Systems and Full Swing Golf. For both methods, one camera is floor mounted facing the ball trajectory from the side, the other is over head mounted and facing down. ProTee United is using a high speed sensor system to read club head information, special floor sensors for putting and two high speed cameras (one on the floor and one on the ceiling) to pick up ball flight information. An alternative method of measuring these two angles is to mount both cameras in the upper left and right corners of the bay. This is known as stereoscopic image processing.

=== Dimensions ===
The typical dimensions of a golf simulator are approximately 4 or 5 metres (13 or 16 ft) wide × 6 meters (20 ft) in length and just over 3 meters (9.8 ft) in height. This allows freedom of movement whilst swinging. This space typically allows for both left- and right-handed players with 2-meter (6 ft 7 in) backswings and follow throughs.

=== Advantages ===
The principal advantage of a golf simulator is the ability to conveniently play and practice in a controlled ambience. Often this means the ability to play without any pressure, green fees, or tee times; however, the advent of "indoor golf centers", which provide simulators for commercial play, bring many of these competitive and social aspects into the simulated game. For those who live in wintry climes or urban settings, golf simulators offer the ability to play and practice year-round or within the confines of their locale. The space requirements can range from just needing an 8-foot (2.4 m) ceiling to an entire wall upon which the game's screen is attached. The next important advantage is the player's ability to see each facet of their swing. Many golf simulators measure: angle of attack, angle of the club face, club head speed, spin, club path (inside out or outside in), and more. These measurements help both students and teaching professionals identify exactly what a player needs to know to improve their swing.

=== Mechanics ===
There are a number of different technologies in use presently. Principally they either track ball flight or club head motion. Ball flight is typically tracked via wavelength (infrared), audio, and/or laser sensors. These instruments serve as a means by which the ball's flight properties are tracked, namely launch angle, ball speed and ball direction. Club motion is similarly tracked via wavelength sensors or other devices such tethers, cameras, or lasers, which record the speed and direction of the club's head as well as the impact point of the ball on the club's striking surface. In some cases, based on the location of the sensing devices, it is now possible to capture data on both ball and club for most accurate speed and directional information, and simulated ball flight behavior.

The data collected is extrapolated to provide ball flight trajectory and roll out according to certain calculated relationships to the ball's flight performance per the tracked motion of the ball or club, adding environmental aspects through which the ball is projected, including terrain, wind, rain and other such influences or obstacles.

The way that the information is tracked varies as much as having a wall-sized screen recording ball speed and placement upon impact, to sensors that record the moments before, during and after the impact between the ball and club, in which case, the ball is held by a tether.

=== Accuracy ===
A key attribute of any simulator is accuracy. Ball flight is the primary determinant of a system's accuracy. Speed of the calculations and a predictable projected image of the ball in flight is one measurement of a system's accuracy. Predictability or the plausibility of prediction is a measure according to known ball flight properties among golf experts.

A ball's flight depends upon many things, including the ball itself, the strike and impact of the club upon the ball, the ball's launch angle, direction, spin rate and velocity, as well as the hitting surface from which the ball is struck and the simulated environment through which the ball virtually flies, suggesting wind, rain, and other environmental aspects that may affect ball flight. The battle for superiority in this market exists between the technologies utilized to track ball flight or club motion.
