= Long drive =

Golf sport

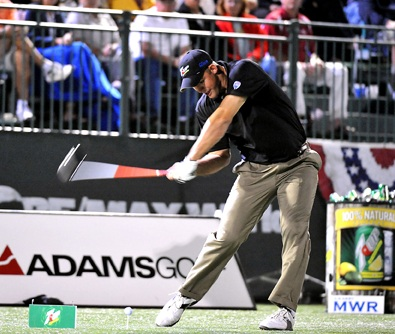
A military veteran long drive competition

Long drive is a sport where players compete to hit or drive a golf ball the farthest. Top long drivers compete professionally in events and exhibitions.

== Distance ==
Professional long drivers can average over 356 yards (326 m) in competition, compared with 305 yards (279 m) averages from the top PGA Tour drivers and 225 yards (206 m) for an average amateur. Some shots in competitions surpass 400 yards (370 m).

The world record recognized by Guinness World Records as the longest drive in a competition is 515 yards (471 m) by 64-year-old Mike Austin in 1974 at the US Senior National Open Qualifier with a 43.5" steel shafted persimmon wood driver. The record distance achieved in the European Long Drive Championship is 473 yards (433 m) by Allen Doyle in September 2005. The record distance achieved in the South African Long Drive Championship is 506 yards (463 m) by Nico Grobbelaar in September 2012.

Fast swingers can swing their club heads at over 150 mph (240 km/h), well beyond the 93 mph (150 km/h) average for an amateur. Competitors train for strength, flexibility, and speed and often perform corporate exhibitions for money, exhibiting a variety of trick shots. Ball speeds are nearly double that of an average golfer (220 mph).

Jason Zuback is perhaps the best known competitor in long drive. He is one of six people to win multiple World Long Drive Championships, with four consecutive wins from 1996 to 1999 and a fifth win in 2006; the other multiple champions are Sean Fister (1995, 2001, and 2005), Jamie Sadlowski (2008 and 2009), Joe Miller (2010 and 2016), Tim Burke (2013 and 2015) and Kyle Berkshire (2019, 2021, and 2023).

== Equipment ==
Long drive clubs, which are always drivers, differ in several ways from consumer clubs. Until the recent club length limitation rules, the shafts were much longer than a normal 45 in (114.3 cm) shaft, sometimes exceeding 55 in (139.7 cm). In 2005, a 50 in (127.0 cm) limitation was introduced (measured vertically). Long drive shafts differ from standard shafts. The main difference is greater stiffness, as a flexible shaft will lag in an inconsistent manner, causing a loss of control. These shafts are almost always made of graphite, which is lighter than steel. In order to be stiff, a shaft is usually heavier and stronger than consumer clubs. The 'kick point' or 'bend point' is also higher for a lower trajectory relative to the swing, while shaft have a lower torque, meaning that long drive clubs will not twist as much, allowing the club-head to stay straighter. In November 2016, to align them with the standard rules of golf, the World Long Drive Association further-reduced the length limitation to 48 in (120 cm)—the maximum length allowed by the USGA.

Club-heads usually approach the 460 cubic centimeter limit, rarely below 400 cc. They must stay within the coefficient of restitution (COR) limit of 0.83, which measures how a ball hits off the surface. Most club-heads only approach the COR in the center of the club, so technology has allowed more area of the club to possess a COR of above 0.80. Thus, mishits are less affected by the newer clubheads. The loft of a long drive club is also much lower than a consumer club, sometimes around 4 or 5 degrees, as opposed to 10.5 degrees for an amateur's driver. The reason for lower lofted driver heads is to greatly reduce back spin. Too much back spin causes the ball to balloon or climb, creating a steep landing angle which does not allow the ball roll out. A flatter landing angle is desired to get the most out of the ball's forward velocity and energy.

Many competitions require golfers to use a specification ball for the tournament. The specific design characteristics of this ball include a dimple design that helps to maintain lower spin rates and a ball compression of 110. The average ball compression in golf varies from the mid-70s to the upper 80s.

== Notable long drivers ==
- Sebastian Twaddell, Golf Ball Speed Record Holder 2025 - 246.8 mph (Trackman)
- Francis Michel, Amateur WLD Champion - 2024
- Kyle Berkshire, World Long Drive Champion - 2019 & 2021. In October 2023 he drove 579.63 yards, setting a new World Record.
- Maurice Allen, World Long Drive Champion - 2018
- Justin James, World Long Drive Champion - 2017 - Ranking #1 in the World was maintained until June 2019
- Joe Miller, World Long Drive Champion 2010 & 2016
- Tim Burke, World Long Drive Champion - 2013 & 2015
- David Mobley, World Long Drive Champion – 2004 – Ranked #1 in the World by Long Drivers of America in 2003, 2004, and 2005
- Mike Austin, He was credited by Guinness World Records with hitting the longest drive in tournament play (471m/515 yards) in 1974
- Sean Fister ("The Beast"), World Long Drive Champion 1995, 2001, 2005.
- Monte Scheinblum, 1992 U.S. National and World Long Drive Champion.
- Jason Zuback ("Golfzilla"), World Long Drive Champion 1996, 1997, 1998, 1999, 2006. Seniors World Long Drive Champion 2015.
- Sandra Carlborg, Ladies Division WR holder 391, Yards World Long Drive Champion 2011, 2012, 2014, 2015, 2017
- Phillis Meti 2006, 2016 2018 2022 & 2024 Women's World Long Drive Champion. WR for women's longest drive 413 yards and being the youngest female World Champion 19 years, 2 months. Hit 349 yards on the WLD grid in 2008 Mesquite NV and 382 yards on WLD grid 2023 in Atlanta GA.
