= Happy Gilmore =

1996 comedy film by Dennis Dugan

- Theatrical release poster
- Directed by: Dennis Dugan
- Written by: Tim Herlihy; Adam Sandler
- Produced by: Robert Simonds
- Starring: Adam Sandler; Christopher McDonald; Julie Bowen; Carl Weathers
- Cinematography: Arthur Albert
- Edited by: Jeff Gourson
- Music by: Mark Mothersbaugh
- Production companies: Brillstein-Grey Entertainment; Robert Simonds Productions
- Distributed by: Universal Pictures
- Release date: February 16, 1996
- Running time: 92 minutes
- Country: United States
- Language: English
- Budget: $12 million
- Box office: $41.4 million

Happy Gilmore is a 1996 American sports comedy film starring Adam Sandler in the title role. Directed by Dennis Dugan and produced by Robert Simonds, the supporting cast includes Christopher McDonald, Julie Bowen, and Carl Weathers. The film follows Happy Gilmore, a boorish, failed ice hockey player with a unique talent for golf, who seeks to raise enough money to prevent the foreclosure of his grandmother's house.

The screenplay was written by Sandler and his writing partner Tim Herlihy, in their second feature collaboration after the previous year's Billy Madison. This film also marks the first collaboration between Sandler and Dugan. Happy Gilmore was released in theaters on February 16, 1996, by Universal Pictures, and received mixed reviews from critics. The film was a commercial success, earning $41.4 million on a $12 million budget, and it won an MTV Movie Award for Best Fight for Sandler and Bob Barker. It has developed a cult following, especially in the golf community. A sequel, Happy Gilmore 2, was released on Netflix in 2025.

== Plot ==
Happy Gilmore is an aspiring hockey player, despite a powerful slapshot learned from his father who was accidentally killed by a puck during a game he brought Happy to. Happy, played hockey in high school and after graduation and kept getting fired from several jobs, he kept trying out for the Boston Bruins but never made the team and as a result, his girlfriend Terry dumps him because all he cared about was hockey. One day, Happy learns that his grandmother Anna, who raised him after his father's death, owes the Internal Revenue Service (IRS) $270,000 in back taxes.

Anna has 90 days to pay off the debt or face foreclosure on her house. Happy sends her to a retirement home until he can figure out a way to pay off the debt. However, unbeknownst to Happy, the residents are mistreated and forced to work in a sweatshop.

While challenging a pair of movers repossessing his late grandfather's old golf clubs, he discovers that his unorthodox slapshot-style swing can drive a ball 400 yards. He begins hustling golfers at a driving range, where he meets Chubbs Peterson, a former pro golf star who lost a hand in an alligator.

Chubbs urges Happy to enter the Waterbury Open, the winner of which will earn an automatic spot on the PGA Tour, as well as a sizable cash reward. Desperate to reclaim his Grandma's house, Happy agrees and wins the Open. Learning that he needs to supply his own caddy on the tour, Happy hastily hires a homeless man named Otto.

During his first tournament, he begins to lash out and act more violent like a hockey player. As tour president Doug Thompson watches Happy on the monitors, he gets his assistant Virginia Venit to tell Happy to change his behavior or else not only will Happy be kicked off the tour, but Virginia will be fired. Virginia meets Happy at a party after the tournament, Happy tries to attack Shooter McGavin who's the tour's top golfer who's not fond of Happy's playing, but Virginia stops him. Virginia warns Happy that he is stop with his violent behavior or he will never play on the tour again. Meanwhile Happy's behavior is beginning to improve, with Virginia watching his every move. At one of the games, he encounters the alligator who took Chubbs' hand and Happy is also winning more tournaments and more money and becomes an instant celebrity. Shooter however begins to lose his popularity, he tells Thompson that golf doesn't need Happy, but Thompson tells Shooter that Happy is making the TV ratings of the tournaments improve and if Happy breaks any rules, then he will be kicked off.

Happy takes Virginia ice skating and he tells that he wanted to join the golf tour because of Grandma's house, then Virginia decides to officially fall in love with Happy and help him get Grandma's house back for her. The next day, Happy takes part in a Pro–am tournament with Bob Barker, however throughout the tournament, Happy is distracted a heckler named Donald, causing Happy and Barker to lose the tournament. Barker protests Happy's performance and as a result, the two brawl in a fistfight all over the golf course. Then it was revealed that Shooter had hired Donald to cause the heckling to get Happy kicked off the tour. The next day, Thompson has a meeting with Happy, Shooter and Virginia about the brawl with Barker, Happy tells Thompson that it was Donald's fault they lost the tournament and that Happy didn't want to attack Barker, he actually wanted to attack Donald. Then Thompson tells them what he and the staff had decided, because of the high TV ratings of the tournament, Happy will not be kicked off the tour, but will be punished with a one-month suspension and a $25,000 fine, also Virginia is suspended as well.

Depressed over the suspension, Happy and Virginia try to come up with alternate ways to get Grandma's house back, while at Subway (which is Happy's favorite place to eat), Happy holds up his favorite sandwich which impresses Virginia. She then asks Subway if Happy can become a spokesperson to make commercials for them which they agreed. For the first commercial he made for them, he was paid enough money for the $25,000 fine and to get the house back, but they find that Shooter had won the house during the auction. Then Happy challenges Shooter for the tour championship when he returns from the suspension which Shooter accepts with a stipulation. If Happy wins, then Happy can get the house back, but if Shooter wins not only will he take the house, but Happy will retire from golf forever.

Happy then realized that he needed Chubbs the whole time, the two go to a miniature golf course to practice putting. Chubbs then presents Happy with a putter he designed, so that Happy can combine golf with hockey. However Happy tells Chubbs that he killed the alligator that took his hand and showed him the head, but Chubbs then falls to his death. This made Happy more depressed because losing Chubbs' was like losing his father and Shooter shows up and blames Happy for Chubbs' death.

As the championship tournament is underway. Shooter takes the lead early, but Happy's regular game puts him in front with one round to go. A crazed Donald attacks Happy with a Volkswagen Beetle, impairing his long-drive ability and focus. Shooter takes the lead, but Happy, encouraged by Grandma, rallies to tie him. On the final hole, Shooter's tee shot lands in the crowd. Despite having to play the ball off the foot of Happy's imposing ex-boss, Mr. Larson, he manages to save par with a long putt. A television tower damaged by Donald's car falls onto the green and blocks Happy's line to a winning putt. Shooter insists that Happy plays the ball "as it lies," and, remembering what Chubbs taught him, Happy wins by using the tower as a Rube Goldberg machine to sink his putt.

Enraged, Shooter tries to steal Happy's gold jacket and run away but gets caught and beaten by a mob of fans led by Larson. Returning to the house, Happy celebrates his victory with her, Virginia, and Otto. Happy looks up and sees Abraham Lincoln, a now two-handed Chubbs and the now two-eyed alligator (who now became friends with Chubbs in heaven) waving to Happy as they congratulate him for winning the tournament.

== Cast ==
- Adam Sandler as Happy Gilmore, a short-tempered aspiring hockey player who discovers an unknown ability for long shots in golf. Sandler also provided the voice of the Laughing Clown.
  - Donnie MacMillan as Young Happy Gilmore.
- Christopher McDonald as Shooter McGavin, an arrogant star golfer who despises Happy's lack of etiquette.
- Julie Bowen as Virginia Venit, the pro golf tour public relations director who becomes Happy's romantic interest.
- Frances Bay as Anna Gilmore, Happy's mild-mannered grandmother.
- Carl Weathers as Derick "Chubbs" Peterson, a former pro golfer and Happy's coach and mentor. (Note: Weathers reprises the role in Sandler's 2000 film Little Nicky, despite Little Nicky being produced by New Line Cinema.)
- Allen Covert as Otto, a homeless man who becomes Happy's caddy on the tour and Happy's best friend. (Note: The character is unnamed in the film (although his name is revealed in a deleted scene and is listed in the end credits). Covert reprises the role in Sandler's 2011 film Jack and Jill, despite Jack and Jill being produced by Columbia Pictures.)
- Richard Kiel as Mr. Larson, Happy's intimidating but friendly former boss.
- Dennis Dugan as Doug Thompson, the commissioner of the pro golf tour.
- Joe Flaherty as Donald Floyd, an unruly fan hired by Shooter to heckle Happy.

Additionally, Ben Stiller is uncredited for his role as abusive orderly Hal. Robert Smigel plays the IRS agent who informs Happy that Grandma is delinquent on taxes, and Will Sasso and Dee Jay Jackson appear as the movers who challenge Happy at golf.

Jared Van Snellenberg portrays Happy's unnamed caddy at the Waterbury Open (later revealed in the sequel to be professional golfer Will Zalatoris despite him not even having been born when the first film was produced and released), and Kevin Nealon plays Gary Potter, an eccentric professional golfer and Happy's partner at the AT&T Open. Professional golfers Lee Trevino and Mark Lye, sportscaster Verne Lundquist, and then-current The Price Is Right host Bob Barker all play themselves. Charles L. Brame makes an uncredited appearance as the spirit of Abraham Lincoln, who waves to Happy along with the spirits of Chubbs and the alligator in the final scene.

== Production ==
=== Development ===
Happy Gilmore was directed by Dennis Dugan, and written by Saturday Night Live (SNL) alumni Tim Herlihy and Adam Sandler. Herlihy and Sandler were roommates in college and wrote stand-up comedy together, before moving on to screenplays. After Sandler was fired from SNL in 1995, he moved on to films. He and Herlihy wrote Billy Madison (1995), which proved successful for distributor Universal Pictures. As such, Herlihy and Sandler began a new project. In an office during a brainstorming session, they came up with a high-concept premise for a film about a "hockey player who smacks a 400 yard drive". Judd Apatow performed a script rewrite, although he went uncredited.

The Happy Gilmore character is loosely based on Sandler's childhood friend Kyle McDonough, who played ice hockey and would golf with Sandler as they grew up. Sandler could never hit the ball as far as McDonough, and figured that McDonough's hockey skills gave him an edge. Meanwhile, Chubbs Peterson's missing hand is an in-joke referencing actor Carl Weathers' film Predator (1987), which depicts his character losing his arm. Herlihy and Sandler included any joke that made them laugh and do not remember who came up with which, although Herlihy takes credit for Shooter McGavin's "I eat pieces of shit like you for breakfast" line. In a 1994 interview, Sandler cited the golf comedy Caddyshack (1980), a film he and Herlihy bonded over in college, as inspiration.

Former pro golfer Mark Lye served as a consultant on the script, and told Herlihy and Sandler after seeing their initial ideas, "You gotta be crazy. You cannot do a movie like that." According to Lye, the initial drafts featured Happy winning the Masters Tournament: "They had the green jacket. They were desecrating the USGA. Making fun of Augusta National." He suggested that Happy win a fictional tournament, and Herlihy and Sandler changed the jacket's color from green to gold. Lye also disliked the unrealistic nature of early drafts, which depicted Happy repeatedly making 400-yard drives, so he took the crew to a PGA Tour event so they could understand the atmosphere of golf. The final script, the one Lye gave approval, was Herlihy and Sandler's fifth draft.

Dugan became attached to direct through Sandler. Years earlier, Dugan had attempted to cast Sandler in one of his films, but the producers did not let him because Sandler was not well-known. "A couple of years later, [Sandler] is big", Dugan said. "I wanted to be hired to direct Happy Gilmore with him. I walk in the room, and he says: 'You're the guy who wanted to give me that part. I don't need to know anything else, I want to work with you.'" Happy Gilmore was produced on a budget of $12 million and filmed entirely at locations in British Columbia. Most scenes taking place at golf courses were filmed at Pitt Meadows at the Swan-e-set Bay Resort & Country Club, while interior shots, such as those in the broadcast booth, took place in an abandoned Vancouver hospital. Arthur Albert served as cinematographer, while Mark Lane was the set decorator. Devo frontman Mark Mothersbaugh composed the film's soundtrack.

=== Casting ===
Christopher McDonald declined the role of Shooter McGavin twice because he was tired of playing villains and wanted to spend more time with his family. Kevin Costner was approached, but turned it down in favor of another 1996 golf-themed comedy, Tin Cup, while Bruce Campbell lobbied hard for the part. McDonald became interested in the role after winning a round of golf, and decided to take it after he met with Sandler. According to McDonald, Dugan "didn't want to see the Bad Guy 101 again" and gave McDonald the freedom to improvise on set.

Happy Gilmore features appearances from Richard Kiel, known for playing Jaws in the James Bond film series; Bob Barker, the host of The Price Is Right; and Verne Lundquist, a golf sportscaster.

According to Lundquist, he filmed his scenes in the abandoned hospital as production wrapped. Sandler's New York University roommate Jack Giarraputo sat next to Lundquist in every shot, as Sandler wanted him to appear in the film. In 2016, Lundquist stated he still gets a monthly $34 check from the Screen Actors Guild for his appearance in the film.

=== Filming ===
Filming took place from July 6, 1995 to September 1, 1995, in and around Vancouver, British Columbia, Canada.

== Reception ==
=== Box office ===
Happy Gilmore was a commercial success, ranking number two at the U.S. box office on its debut weekend with $8.5 million in revenue, behind Broken Arrow. The film was made for $12 million and grossed a total of $41.2 million worldwide, with $38.8 million of that at the North American domestic box office. It would also gross more box office money when it was re-released in 2025.

=== Critical response ===
On Rotten Tomatoes, Happy Gilmore has an approval rating of 66% based on 61 reviews. The website's critics consensus reads: "Those who enjoy Adam Sandler's schtick will find plenty to love in this gleefully juvenile take on professional golf; those who don't, however, will find it unfunny and forgettable." On Metacritic, the film has a weighted average score of 31 out of 100 based on 14 critics, indicating "generally unfavorable" reviews. Audiences surveyed by CinemaScore gave the film an average grade "B+" on an A+ to F scale.

Brian Lowry of Variety wrote, "The general tone nevertheless makes it difficult to elevate the gags beyond an occasional chuckle". Lowry only noted a few scenes he found inspired, including the fight scene with Bob Barker and when Happy attempts to find his "Happy Place" which was described as "Felliniesque". Roger Ebert gave the film one and a half stars out of four, stating that Adam Sandler's character "doesn't have a pleasing personality: He seems angry even when he's not supposed to be, and his habit of pounding everyone he dislikes is tiring in a PG-13 movie". Ebert also noted the film's product placement stating that he "probably missed a few, but I counted Diet Pepsi, Pepsi, Pepsi Max, Subway, Budweiser (in bottles, cans, and Bud-dispensing helmets), Michelob, Visa cards, Bell Atlantic, AT&T, Sizzler, Red Lobster, Wilson, Golf Digest, the ESPN sports network, and Top-Flite golf balls". Owen Gleiberman of Entertainment Weekly gave the film a grade "D+" calling it "A one-joke Caddyshack for the blitzed and jaded," although he did praise Sandler's confident performance.

Darren Bignell of Empire wrote: "The real surprise is that it's a lot of fun, with Sandler becoming more personable as the film progresses, and a couple of truly side-splitting scenes."

=== Among golfers ===
The film has developed a cult following in the golf community, with Golf.com, Consequence of Sound, and Golf Digest praising the film, particularly the villain Shooter McGavin.

The "Happy Gilmore swing", featuring a walking or running approach, is often imitated or attempted for fun, including by touring golf professionals. Three-time major champion Pádraig Harrington is particularly well known for his impression and even uses the technique in training. The TV series Sport Science has featured Harrington's "Happy Gilmore swing", demonstrating how it can indeed generate additional distance, though at the cost of accuracy.

Long drive champion and professional golfer Jamie Sadlowski, also a former hockey player who can hit golf balls over 400 yards, has been called "the real-life version of Happy Gilmore".

Lee Trevino regretted his appearance in the film and said he would not have done it if he had known how much swearing there would be in the movie. However, Trevino would later return to make a cameo appearance in the sequel.

In 2020, McDonald reprised his role as Shooter in the trailer for the video game PGA Tour 2K21, and appeared as a playable golfer in PGA Tour 2K25.

=== Bob Barker fight sequence ===
The scene with Barker beating up Gilmore increased interest in The Price Is Right among younger demographics, particularly young men. Barker said that someone in the audience asked him about Happy Gilmore almost every day. Barker parodied the Happy Gilmore fight in a 2014 episode of The Bold and the Beautiful, where he fought Wyatt Spencer after arguing with him.

In 2015, Sandler and Barker reenacted their fight for the Comedy Central Night of Too Many Stars fundraiser in aid of autism charities.

The fight scene was also highlighted in special primetime episodes of The Price Is Right, as well as various news articles that announced Barker's death on August 26, 2023, at the age of 99.

=== Accolades ===
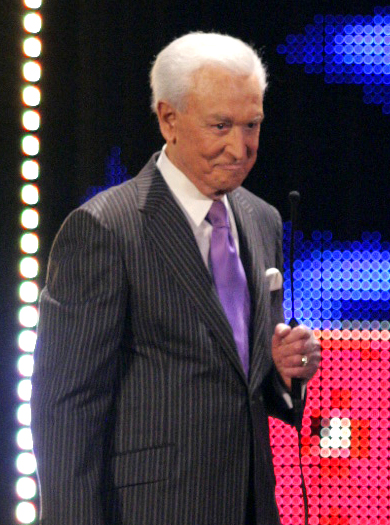
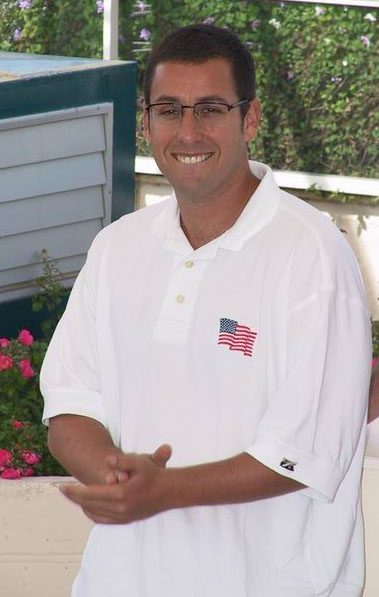
Bob Barker and Adam Sandler won the MTV Movie Award for Best Fight

Year	Award	Category	Result
1996	MTV Movie Award	Best Comedic Performance - Adam Sandler	Nominated
1996	MTV Movie Award	Best Fight - Adam Sandler and Bob Barker	Won
1996	Stinkers Bad Movie Awards	Worst Actor - Adam Sandler	Nominated
1997	Golden Raspberry Awards	Worst Actor - Adam Sandler (also for Bulletproof)	Nominated
1997	Kids' Choice Awards	Best Movie	Nominated

== 2025 re-release ==
The film was re-released by Fandango Media in 2025, with screenings taking place on April 27 and April 30, three months before the release of its sequel Happy Gilmore 2. The sequel was released on July 25, 2025, and is dedicated to Morris, the alligator, who died on May 11, 2025.

== Sequel ==
During September 2022, Sandler stated that he hoped to eventually make a sequel, saying he had been creating ideas for what a follow-up film would be, while stating the character would be involved in a senior golf tour.

In March 2024, Christopher McDonald mentioned that he had been shown a first draft of the script of the sequel by Sandler, reviving speculation of a sequel being made. On May 15, 2024, Netflix confirmed a sequel was in development. Filming began in New Jersey on September 9, 2024, and wrapped up on December 10, 2024. Rapper Eminem, football players Reggie Bush and Travis Kelce, talk show host Dan Patrick, and wrestler Becky Lynch had cameo appearances in the film. The film released on Netflix on July 25, 2025.

== See also ==
- List of films about golf
- List of films about ice hockey
