= Scheinblum =

Scheinblum is a surname. Notable people with the surname include:

- Monte Scheinblum (born 1967), American golfer
- Richie Scheinblum (1942–2021), American Major League Baseball All Star outfielder
