= Terry Forcum =

American golfer (1942–2022)

Personal information
- Full name: Terry Wayne Forcum
- Nationality: United States
- Born: May 4, 1942 Downey, California, U.S.
- Died: July 26, 2022 (aged 80) Wichita, Kansas, U.S.
- Height: 6 ft 5 in (196 cm)
- Weight: 215–230 lb (98–104 kg)

Career
- Sport: Golf
- Turned professional: 1975

Achievements and awards
- World Long Drive Championship: 1983

Terry Wayne Forcum (May 4, 1942 – July 26, 2022) was an American golfer who competed as a professional long drive athlete, winning the World Championship in 1983.

== Personal life ==
Forcum was born in Downey, California, and attended high school in Ponca City, Oklahoma, graduating in 1960. After high school he competed on the rodeo circuit as a bull rider for four years. In 1964 he was drafted into the United States Army and served two years in Wurzburg, Germany. While serving overseas, Forcum competed in football, baseball, boxing and golf. After returning to the States, he attended the University of Houston and opened a welding shop in Ponca City, Oklahoma, but continued playing sports recreationally.

== Long drive career ==
Forcum first picked up a golf club when he was 10 years old. By age 14–15 he realized that he could hit a golf ball an exceptionally long distance. He played on the junior high golf team in Ponca City, but opted to play baseball instead in high school. He played in amateur golf tournaments in the 1960s and became a professional golfer in 1975. Competing in the US National Long Drive Championship, he won 6th place in 1976, 2nd place in 1982, 1st place in 1983 (becoming at age 41 the oldest to do so), and 3rd place in 1988. His 1983 1st place win at the Riviera Country Club in Pacific Palisades, California earned him the title of World Long Drive Champion for that year – see World Long Drive Championship Winners. By 1990, he had finished in the top 10 in long drive competitions in eight of the 10 previous years. He competed in his last National Long Drive Championship in 2008 at the age of 66.

His longest competition drive was 369 yards at a competition held in Tokyo, Japan. He hit a 427-yard drive at a Professional Golfers Association clinic, and his longest recorded drive ever was 547 yards at the Lakeside Golf Course in Ponca City. He could hit a ball up to 300 yards out of a tee box with a 4 wood, 257 yards with a 7 iron, and once hit a 361-yard drive while on his knees. He was also known for hitting "stunt shots" that included driving a ball through a piece of plywood, and hitting a ball out of a person's mouth.

A founding member of the 350 Club, the original group of long drivers who toured the world putting on exhibitions and clinics, the Pro Long Drive Association lists him as a pioneer of the long drive sport.

Forcum died in Wichita, Kansas at the age of 80.
