= Jamie Sadlowski =

Canadian professional long driver, golfer and ice hockey player

Jamie Sadlowski (born July 6, 1988) is a Canadian professional long driver, golfer and ice hockey player from St. Paul, Alberta. One of the longest drivers in the world with a personal best of 445 yards, he won the RE/MAX World Long Drive Championship successively in 2008 and 2009 and has competed in over a hundred long driving events and demonstrations.

== Biography ==
Sadlowski was born in St. Paul, Alberta on July 6, 1988, the son of a highway-repair man. Since his youth, Sadlowski has been a keen ice hockey player and competed for three years in the Alberta Junior Hockey League and was defenseman and team captain for the Bonnyville Pontiacs. He has two brothers; his brother Brandon is also a hockey player. He first entered a long drive competition in Edmonton at the age of 14, and claims to have been able to hit a ball over 400 yards at just 16. His father refers to him as a "freaky boy".

Sadlowski won the World Long Drive Junior Championships in 2005 and 2006. In the adult competition he has defeated rival and distance record holder Mike Dobbyn several times in the RE/MAX World Long Drive Championship finals in 2008 and 2009 but, unlike Dobbyn, is of average height and slight of build at 5'10" and 168 pounds. He won $250,000 for winning his first world title in 2008, and $150,000 defending it in 2009 during the economic difficulties. As of 2011 he has a personal best drive of 445 yards. He won the 2008 finals as number 1 seed against number 2 seed Dewald Gouws, with a drive of 418 yards, hitting 434 yards in an earlier round. He reached the semi-finals in the 2010 championships but lost to eventual champion, England's Joe Miller, with a best of 388 yards as compared to Miller's 396.

In spring 2008, he hit a ball 330 yards using a hybrid club at the Four Seasons Resort and Club in Dallas. In 2010 he won the LDA's Texas Shootout and finished third place at LDA's Mile High Shootout. He also competed in a charity competition at the Hyundai Tournament of Champions in Hawaii which included professional golfers Bubba Watson, Dustin Johnson and Robert Garrigus. He faced Watson in the final and won easily with a drive of 407 yards, compared to Watson's biggest drive of 347 yards (370 at best in earlier rounds). He has competed in over a hundred long driving events and demonstrations and aims to beat Jason Zuback's record of five RE/MAX World Long Drive Championship wins.

== Driving mechanics ==
Sadlowski is naturally left-handed and is able to drive some 300 yards using a left-handed club but is more able playing right-handed. It was in 2010 that he set his personal best of 445 yards and averaged 405 yards. He generally uses a Callaway X2 Hot driver with 4 to 5 degrees of loft in competition with the maximum legal 48" House of Forged Shaft. He has also achieved several other impressive feats with other clubs, with his records as of 2010 being 350 yards with a 14 degree hybrid, 300 yards with a 3-iron, 260 yards with a 5- iron, 240 yards with a 7-iron, 180 yards with a pitching wedge. As of 2011 he resides in Scottsdale, Arizona.

Sadlowski is able to generate such massive lengths far beyond those of some of the more powerfully built professional golfers because of his unique flexibility and leanness of build, remarking, "Because I'm lean, I can get in positions other long drivers can't." Motion Golf, a company that creates sophisticated 3-D swing animations of players, has deduced that in his swing he rotates his shoulders 166 degrees, but his hips move only 49 degrees, creating an X-factor of 117 degrees; Tiger Woods averages around 85 degrees in comparison. "Golf for Dummies" said of his swing, "at the top of Jamie Sadlowski's much longer swing, his hands are at 12 o'clock, and the clubhead is approaching 5 o'clock". Sadlowski claims that the secret behind his unusually long drive is because of his intensive cardio work out and flexibility exercises in the gym and to "Think 'swing fast, not hard.'" CBS golf announcer Gary McCord said the reason he is able to hit such phenomenal distances is because "he's figured out how to move his muscles in time and space faster than the big guys." His very active participation in hockey and in badminton and other sports developed fast-twitch muscle fibers in Sadlowski's left side (very important in the ability to drive long distances), while strengthening his wrists. Art Sellinger says "Jamie has been given a gift of hinges and levers. The hinges are the shoulders, the levers are the wrist. He has two right wrists, everybody else has one. His unusual wrist strength in both wrists is attributed to the fact that during the winter months he has played ice hockey left handed since a child and then in the summer golfed right handed.

== Professional golf career ==
Sadlowski decided to quit long drive competition in the middle of 2016 in order to play professional golf. After realizing his talent in golf after making cuts on Web.com Tour events and winning the U.S. Open qualifier by shooting a 9 under par, he played several events toward the end of 2016, including the Emirates Australian Open and the Venetian Macao Open. Sadlowski made his debut in the BNI Indonesian Masters by shooting 4 under par, ranking at T46. During the event, Sadlowski set the record for the longest drive of 368 yards and the highest ball speed of 194 mph.

In May 2017, Sadlowski made his PGA Tour debut at the Dean & DeLuca Invitational. He qualified for the PGA Tour Canada in 2018.
