= Put return =

Put return may refer to:

- Shot put return channel, labor-saving accessory device for track and field shot putting
- Misspellings of other sport terms:
  - "Punt return", defense task in gridiron football
  - "Putt return", labor-saving device for putting drill in golf
