= Kyle Berkshire =

American World Long Drive competitor

Kyle Berkshire (born November 1, 1996) is an American golfer who competes as a professional long drive athlete. He has won the World Long Drive Championship on four occasions, in 2019, 2020, 2021 and 2023. In October 2023 he drove 579.63 yards, setting a new World Record.

== Personal life ==
Originally from Crofton, Maryland, Berkshire resides in Orlando, Florida. He attended Archbishop Spalding High School in Maryland where he helped the Spalding golf team win two match play and two stroke play MIAA state championships. The team went 31-2-1 in match play during Berkshire's four years including undefeated seasons in 2014 and 2015. He went to the University of North Texas for two years, before transferring to the University of Central Florida. He is a brother in fraternity Zeta Beta Tau.

== Long drive career ==
After reaching the semifinals at the Volvik World Long Drive Championship in 2017, Berkshire in 2018 earned his first World Long Drive victory, winning at the WinStar Midwest Slam in Oklahoma. On September 4, 2019 Berkshire won the 44th World Long Drive Championship in Thackerville, Oklahoma, defeating Tim Burke in the final.

During the pandemic, Comcast shut down the World Long Drive Association in 2020. Players and coach Bobby Peterson formed a new sanctioning body, the Professional Long Drivers Association, where Berkshire won the inaugural PLDA season-ending championship in 2020 at 383 yards. He defended the PLDA Championship (now the PLDA World Championship) in 2021, now having won three consecutive season-ending long drive tour championships.

In December 2021, Berkshire set a new world record for indoor ball speed with 233.4 miles per hour (375.6 km/h).

In October 2023, shortly before the World Long Drive Championship, Berkshire had set a new record for ball speed at 241.6 mph, as well as the longest golf drive ever fully verified at 579.63 yards. On October 22, Berkshire defeated Sean Johnson in the final to claim his fourth season-ending championship match.

== Other golf ventures ==
Berkshire participated in several golf events outside of long-drive competitions. In March 2025, he participated in the second Creator Classic, an event for golf influencers organized by the PGA Tour. In August 2025, Berkshire participated in the inaugural Internet Invitational, another event for golf influencers and organized by Barstool Sports and Bob Does Sports.
