= Kerlin Blaise =

American football player (born 1974)

No. 65, 77
- Position: Guard

Personal information
- Born: December 25, 1974 (age 51); Orlando, Florida, U.S.
- Listed height: 6 ft 5 in (1.96 m)
- Listed weight: 315 lb (143 kg)

Career information
- High school: Maynard Evans (Orlando)
- College: Miami (FL) (1993–1997)
- NFL draft: 1998: undrafted

Career history
- Detroit Lions (1998–2003)
- Stats at Pro Football Reference

Kerlin Blaise (born December 25, 1974) is an American former professional football guard who played five seasons with the Detroit Lions of the National Football League (NFL). He played college football at the University of Miami.

== Early life and college ==
Kerlin Blaise was born on December 25, 1974, in Orlando, Florida. He attended Maynard Evans High School in Orlando.

Blaise played college football for the Miami Hurricanes of the University of Miami. He was redshirted in 1993 and was a four-year letterman from 1994 to 1997.

== Professional career ==
After going undrafted in the 1998 NFL draft, Blaise signed with the Detroit Lions on April 24. He was released on August 30 but signed to the team's practice squad on September 1. He was promoted to the active roster on October 27 but did not appear in any games before being placed on injured reserve on December 1, 1998. Blaise played in all 16 games, starting four, for the Lions during the 1999 season. He also appeared in his only career playoff game that year. He became a free agent after the season and re-signed with the Lions on April 11, 2000.

Blaise played in 12 games in 2000 and became a free agent again after the season. He re-signed with Detroit on April 26, 2001, and appeared in six games that year. He became a free agent for the third year in a row, and re-signed with the Lions once again on April 2, 2002. He started the first two games of the 2002 season before being placed on injured reserve on September 17 and missing the rest of the year. Blaise was released by the Lions on August 31, 2003, but re-signed a few months later on November 11, 2003. He played in two games for the Lions that year and entered free agency after the season.

== Personal life ==
Blaise founded Blaze Contracting, Inc. in 2000.
