= Ryan Reisbeck =

American World Long Drive competitor

Ryan Reisbeck (born August 1, 1978) is a World Long Drive competitor. Reisbeck competes in events that are sanctioned by the World Long Drive Association, which is owned by Golf Channel, part of the NBC Sports Group, and a division of Comcast. The season-long schedule features events airing live on Golf Channel, culminating in the Volvik World Long Drive Championship in September.

He lives in Layton, Utah, and in addition to competing in World Long Drive, he works in insurance and real estate.

== Life before World Long Drive ==
Prior to competing in World Long Drive, Reisbeck was a starting pitcher for Salt Lake Community College, and then a relief pitcher for the University of Utah baseball team. Reisbeck first learned about the World Long Drive tour when he walked into the clubhouse after a round of golf and saw a WLD event on television. Coincidentally that day, Reisbeck's playing partner suggested he join the WLD tour after witnessing Reisbeck's 380-plus yard drive that flew the green.

== World Long Drive career ==
Reisbeck won his first televised World Long Drive event in 2017, capturing the Clash in the Canyon (Nevada). He also earned three victories in 2016: the WinStar Midwest Slam (Oklahoma), Bluff City Shootout (Tennessee) and Rockwell Blast, in his home state of Utah.

== Personal life ==
Reisbeck and his wife Sarah are the parents of five children. His physical stature (6 feet 4 inches (193 cm), 250 pounds (110 kg)) has helped him earn the nickname “The Big Deal.”
