= Tim Burke (golfer) =

American World Long Drive competitor

Tim Burke (born October 13, 1986) is an American golfer who competes as a professional long drive athlete. He has won the World Long Drive Championship on two occasions, in 2013 and 2015.

Burke lives in Orlando, Florida.

== Early life ==
Prior to taking part in his first World Long Drive competition in 2009, Burke was a pitcher at the University of Miami, where he took part in the College World Series in 2008.

== Long drive career ==
Burke is a two-time Volvik World Long Drive champion, capturing his first championship belt at the Las Vegas Motor Speedway in 2013, where hitters struck tee shots from the stands with balls landing in the grid on the track infield below. He beat fellow two-time world champion Joe Miller in the finals. In 2015, Burke claimed his second world title at WinStar World Casino & Resort in Thackerville, Oklahoma, defeating Jeremy Easterly in the finals. He also made an in-studio appearance on The Dan Patrick Show following his world title win in 2015. Burke also was featured on an episode of Golf Channel’s Playing Lessons instruction series in 2018, alongside show host and renowned instructor Sean Foley. Burke also was featured in the April 2018 issue of Muscle & Fitness magazine.
