= Mike Dobbyn =

American golfer

Mike Dobbyn is an American professional long-drive golfer who holds the world record for the farthest drive in history: a recorded drive at 551 yards. In regular professional golf, the hardest hitters average just over 300 yards. However, although his longest drive is 551 yards, most of his drives range between 350 and 450 yards. He has a considerable physical advantage over many of the other drivers, with a height of 6'8" and weight of 310-5 pounds. He won the 2007 World Long Drive Championships and has reached the finals on three occasions but has been beaten by rival Jamie Sadlowski (5'10" and 165-8 pounds) twice in 2008 and 2009.
