= Pine Hills, Florida =

Unincorporated area in Florida, US

Pine Hills
- Census-designated place
- Location in Orange County and the state of Florida
- Coordinates: 28°34′54″N 81°28′09″W
- Country: United States
- State: Florida
- County: Orange

Area
  - Census-designated place: 12.68 sq mi (32.84 km^{2})
  - Land: 12.19 sq mi (31.58 km^{2})
  - Water: 0.49 sq mi (1.26 km^{2})
- Elevation: 95 ft (29 m)

Population (2020)
  - Census-designated place: 66,111
  - Density: 5,421.3/sq mi (2,093.19/km^{2})
  - Urban: 1,377,342 (35th)
  - Metro: 2,134,311 (26th)
- Time zone: UTC-5 (EST)
  - Summer (DST): UTC-4 (EDT)
- ZIP code(s): 32808, 32818
- Area codes: 407, 689
- FIPS code: 12-56825
- GNIS feature ID: 2403411

Pine Hills is a census-designated place (CDP) and unincorporated subdivision in Orange County, Florida, United States, west of Orlando. Per the 2020 U.S. census, the population was 66,111. It is a part of the Orlando–Kissimmee–Sanford, Florida Metropolitan Statistical Area (home to 2,134,311 people in 2010).

As a result of residential demographic shifts, the area has been described as one of Central Florida's most prominent minority-majority communities, featuring significant African American, Haitian, Jamaican, and Puerto Rican population centers.

== History ==
The area that would become Pine Hills began in 1953 with the first subdivisions – Robinswood and Pine Ridge Estates – constructed along the newly completed Pine Hills Road north of Colonial Drive (SR 50). It was one of the first suburbs of Orlando and grew as a bedroom community for the workers of Martin Marietta (now Lockheed Martin). At the time, it was an upper-middle class suburb with a country club named "Silver Pines."

During the 1960s and into the 1970s, Pine Hills grew north from the original subdivisions around Pine Hills Road and Colonial Drive to include new neighborhoods off of Silver Star Road in the north around Powers Drive, and to the east around Pine Hills and Indian Hill Roads. The community built its own fire department, a post office branch, and several schools.

In the 1970s, the Orange County government seized Pine Hills' fire engine in an effort to consolidate county-wide fire services. Nevertheless, Pine Hills continued to grow and community leaders began an initiative to incorporate Pine Hills into a city. However, this initiative was eventually abandoned.

During the 1980s, the City of Orlando began annexing sections of Pine Hills. Some areas annexed during this time include North Lane east of Pine Hills Road, Clarion Drive south of Clarcona-Ocoee Road, and areas of the Signal Hill subdivision. Residents rejected further annexation, fearing larger taxes and little representation from Orlando. Eventually, as Orlando's growth surrounded Pine Hills, many of the original families moved into newer neighborhoods in nearby Ocoee, Winter Garden, and MetroWest.

Into the late 1980s and during the 1990s, Pine Hills fell into a state of decline. Silver Pines Country Club was closed, and apartment complexes were built on the property in the mid-1990s. The "Pine Hills Shopping Center" lost its long-time tenants and was eventually converted in the late 1990s into "Pine Hills Marketplace," a strip mall with discount stores.

As newer neighborhoods developed offering more housing options, rental rates dropped and housing became more affordable for residents. Paired with the long-term effects of post-desegregation white flight, neglect from the Orange County government, particularly from the Orange County Board of Commissioners, has resulted in higher crime, and the perpetuation that the area is a less safe or desirable place to live. As of 2013, Pine Hills' perception as a high-crime area has begun to shift in a positive direction, by virtue of community-wide initiatives and efforts led by residents. Many schools and churches offer after-school programs and to some extent, free daycare. The Orlando Police Department has collaborated with the Orange County Sheriff's Office to prevent crime by increasing patrols through the neighborhoods. The government of Orange County is also increasing code enforcement and issuing citations to property owners who neglect to maintain their home's appearance.

Recent developments in Pine Hills included the reconstruction of Evans High School main campus on Silver Star Road; completed in 2012. Reconstruction was also completed at Meadowbrook and Robinswood Middle Schools, and Pine Hills, Rolling Hills, and Mollie E. Ray Elementary Schools. Additional development includes Orlando's newest "Chinatown," located along west Colonial Drive across from the Pine Hills Marketplace. West Colonial Drive, one of the main highways in Pine Hills, was redesigned and construction completed in 2011, bringing better traffic management and improved landscaping to Pine Hills. Other traffic improvement initiatives in Pine Hills included repaving and redesigning the intersection of Pine Hills and Silver Star Roads. Future initiatives include the expansion of Pine Hills Road south to LB Mcleod Road. Lynx, the local transportation agency, is constructing a SuperStop transit connection for multiple bus routes to provide easy access for workers.

== Neighborhood revitalization ==
The most recent effort to revitalize Pine Hills began with the creation of the "Pine Hills Safe Neighborhood Partnership". It is a group of neighborhood residents who collaborate with the Orange County Government and local law enforcement agencies in an effort to make the area safer. The group is a 501c3 non-profit organization and has received grant funding from private and public resources. The grants fund a variety of projects designed to deter crime and enhance resident safety. Some initiatives include hiring off-duty law enforcement officers to make extra patrols, offering summer youth programs to keep youth engaged, and helping neighborhoods make infrastructure improvements to traffic patterns, community lighting, and more. Regular community meetings are held at the Pine Hills Community Center.

In 2004, the Pine Hills Community Council, Inc. commissioned the Pine Hills Land Analysis and Strategic Plan, which outlined a vision for revitalization and economic growth supported by residents. Since this study was released, the neighborhood has continued to focus on revitalization initiatives by holding community forums, establishing partnerships with private developers and public agencies. It also engages property owners and renters in protecting the area's quality of life. As a result of the community partnerships and focus on crime prevention, the sheriff's office has reported downward crime trends except for vehicle break-ins in this area.

Additionally, in October 2009, Mayor Richard Crotty established the Pine Hills Business Redevelopment Task Force. This 13-member advisory committee was created to assist with the economic revitalization of the area.

== Diversity ==
Pine Hills is one of the most ethnically diverse regions of the Greater Orlando metropolitan area and is a minority majority community. The populations of African Americans and Hispanics are reported to be significantly above the state of Florida's average. The foreign-born population is also above the state average. There are large Caribbean populations of Haitians, Jamaicans, and Puerto Ricans. There is also a large Asian population of Vietnamese, Koreans, and Cambodians. This diversity is evident along Pine Hills Road where many immigration offices, Caribbean and Asian restaurants, and West Indian grocery stores abound.

A near-replica of Elvis Presley's Graceland Mansion, constructed in 1981, is located off North Hiawassee Road in the Hyland Oaks subdivision.

In 2010, Evans High School became the first UCF-Certified Community Partnership School in the state of Florida, established through a collaboration between the Children's Home Society of Florida, Orange County Public Schools, and the University of Central Florida. Since Evans became a Community Partnership School, student test scores and other metrics have significantly increased, Ellis says. Especially notable: Evans’ graduation rate has improved from 64 percent in the 2010–2011 school year (when CPS efforts began) to 87 percent in the 2016–2017 school year. Prior to becoming a Community Partnership School, Evans was labeled a “dropout factory” by Johns Hopkins University.

== Geography ==
According to the United States Census Bureau, the CDP has a total area of 12.7 square miles (33.0 km^{2}), of which 12.2 square miles (31.7 km^{2}) is land and 0.50 square miles (1.3 km^{2}) (3.87%) is water.

== Demographics ==
Historical population
Census	Pop.	Note	%±
1970	13,882		—
1980	35,771		157.7%
1990	35,322		−1.3%
2000	41,764		18.2%
2010	60,076		43.8%
2020	66,111		10.0%
Population 1970–2010.

=== Racial and ethnic composition ===
Pine Hills CDP, Florida – Racial and ethnic composition Note: the US Census treats Hispanic/Latino as an ethnic category. This table excludes Latinos from the racial categories and assigns them to a separate category. Hispanics/Latinos may be of any race.
Race / Ethnicity (NH = Non-Hispanic)	Pop 2000	Pop 2010	Pop 2020	% 2000	% 2010	% 2020
White alone (NH)	11,591	7,793	5,788	27.75%	12.97%	8.75%
Black or African American alone (NH)	21,004	39,642	44,711	50.29%	65.99%	67.63%
Native American or Alaska Native alone (NH)	86	167	117	0.21%	0.28%	0.18%
Asian alone (NH)	1,196	2,225	2,060	2.86%	3.70%	3.12%
Native Hawaiian or Pacific Islander alone (NH)	19	41	26	0.05%	0.07%	0.04%
Other race alone (NH)	202	465	824	0.48%	0.77%	1.25%
Mixed race or Multiracial (NH)	1,791	1,419	2,023	4.29%	2.36%	3.06%
Hispanic or Latino (any race)	5,875	8,324	10,562	14.07%	13.86%	15.98%
Total	41,764	60,076	66,111	100.00%	100.00%	100.00%

=== 2020 census ===
As of the 2020 census, Pine Hills had a population of 66,111. The median age was 35.4 years. 26.3% of residents were under the age of 18 and 12.9% of residents were 65 years of age or older. For every 100 females there were 90.1 males, and for every 100 females age 18 and over there were 86.3 males age 18 and over.

100.0% of residents lived in urban areas, while 0.0% lived in rural areas.

There were 21,087 households in Pine Hills, of which 39.6% had children under the age of 18 living in them. Of all households, 37.2% were married-couple households, 19.3% were households with a male householder and no spouse or partner present, and 36.9% were households with a female householder and no spouse or partner present. About 20.0% of all households were made up of individuals and 7.4% had someone living alone who was 65 years of age or older.

There were 22,219 housing units, of which 5.1% were vacant. The homeowner vacancy rate was 1.4% and the rental vacancy rate was 5.9%.

Racial composition as of the 2020 census
Race	Number	Percent
White	7,661	11.6%
Black or African American	45,682	69.1%
American Indian and Alaska Native	213	0.3%
Asian	2,088	3.2%
Native Hawaiian and Other Pacific Islander	43	0.1%
Some other race	5,107	7.7%
Two or more races	5,317	8.0%
Hispanic or Latino (of any race)	10,562	16.0%

=== 2018 American Community Survey estimates ===
In 2018, the CDP population was spread out, with 51% under the age of 18, 10.2% from 18 to 24, 30.6% from 25 to 44, 18.4% from 45 to 64, and 7.9% who were 65 years of age or older. The median age was 30 years. For every 100 females, there were 92.9 males. For every 100 females age 18 and over, there were 88.2 males.

In 2018, the median income for a household in the CDP was $37,158 and the median income for a family was $41,063. Males had a median income of $29,676 versus $27,435 for females. The per capita income for the CDP was $16,137. About 12.5% of families and 14.9% of the population were below the poverty line, including 25.4% of those under age 18 and 14.8% of those age 65 or over.

=== 2010 census ===
As of the 2010 United States census, there were 60,076 people, 20,888 households, and 15,170 families residing in the CDP.

=== 2000 census ===
As of 2000, 38.3% had children under the age of 18 living with them, 41% were married couples living together, 28.7% had a female householder with no husband present, and 27.5% were non-families. 21.2% of all households were made up of individuals, and 6.9% had someone living alone who was 65 years of age or older. The average household size was 3.11 and the average family size was 3.53.

=== Languages ===
As of 2000, English spoken as a first language accounted for 66.00% of all residents, while 26.99% spoke other languages as their mother tongue. The most significant were Spanish speakers who made up 12.45% of the population, while Haitian Creole came up as the third most spoken language, which made up 10.76%, French was at fourth, at 1.76%, and Vietnamese was spoken by 1.44% of the population.

== Economy ==
The primary industry in Pine Hills is retail. West Colonial Drive is also known as "car row" with many car dealerships lining the street. The Central Florida Fairgrounds offers a fruit and vegetable market every Saturday as well as concerts and other events. The community's football teams play at its site. The Orange County Environmental Division is located in the area.

With its proximity to Interstate 4 and Highway 408, there are many small industrial businesses in this section of town. The industrial sector located along east Silver Star Road in Orlando's city limits includes a Frito-Lay and Coca-Cola manufacturing and distribution facilities. Many marble and flooring companies are located in this part of the county.

Due to its central location, Pine Hills is close to Orlando's business and tourism centers. Many residents commute to downtown Orlando, less than 5 miles (8.0 km) east, to the northern suburb of Maitland, or to the International Drive, Universal Orlando Resort, and Walt Disney World Resort tourist districts. There is good public transportation through the local transit authority, Lynx. Also, the Greyhound bus station is conveniently close.

== Education ==
=== Elementary schools ===
- Hiawassee Elementary
- Lake Gem Elementary
- Mollie E. Ray Elementary
- Pine Hills Elementary
- Rolling Hills Elementary
- Ridgewood Park Elementary
- UCP Pine Hills Charter School

=== Middle schools ===
- Meadowbrook Middle School
- Robinswood Middle School

=== High school ===
- Maynard Evans High School

=== Private school ===
There are several private schools in Pine Hills offering Pre K-Grade 12 curriculum.

=== Colleges ===
- Valencia College West Campus - less than 3 miles (4.8 km) south of Pine Hills.

== Parks and recreation ==
Public parks in Pine Hills are managed by Orange County Parks and Recreation. Admission is free to all parks. There are four parks in Pine Hills:

- Barnett Park - The signature park of Pine Hills and also the largest. Home to Lawne Lake, a professional BMX track, biking and nature trails, football fields, ball fields, dog parks, and event pavilions. It is adjacent to the Central Florida Fairgrounds which hosts cultural events throughout the year.
- Rolling Hills Park - Located on North Pine Hills Road, this park has several ball fields and playgrounds.

== Infrastructure ==
=== Transportation ===
==== Arterial highways ====
- West Colonial Drive State Road 50
- State Road 408 - A limited-access toll road that runs east–west just south of Pine Hills in Orlo Vista
- Silver Star Road - East-west connector to U.S. Route 441 (Orange Blossom Trail)

=== Secondary roads ===
- Pine Hills Road - North to south
- Hiawassee Road - another North to South road paralleling Pine Hills road.
- Clarcona-Ocoee Road - northern border of Pine Hills and another east–west connector to Orange Blossom Trail

=== Tertiary roads ===
- Hastings Street
- Balboa Drive
- Powers Drive
- North Lane

==== Mass transit ====
Lynx is the public bus transportation system serving Greater Orlando; it has many stops throughout Pine Hills.

== Notable people ==
- Maurice Allen, professional golfer
- Chucky Atkins, NBA basketball player
- Darryl Dawkins, NBA basketball player
- Alan Eustace, Google senior vice president
- Alex Haynes, NFL Baltimore Ravens
- Chris Johnson, NFL Tennessee Titans
- Kenard Lang, NFL Denver Broncos
- Thomas McClary, the original Commodore, The Commodores
- Brandon Siler, NFL San Diego Chargers
- Mike Sims-Walker, NFL Jacksonville Jaguars
- Darius Washington, NBA San Antonio Spurs
- Jeff Zimmerman, NFL Dallas Cowboys

== "Crime Hills Narrative" ==
Into the late 1990s and early 2000s, Pine Hills' worsening economic decline resulted in the increasingly negative public perception of the area in local media, and public discourse.

In recent years, this pattern of unfavorable media coverage of Pine Hills has resulted in passionate discourse regarding the true causes and nature of the current state of the area, exacerbated by the generational divide of residents that lived in Pine Hills during its most economically prosperous time, and more recent generations of residents.

Negative psychological impacts of this online discourse, manifest tangibly in a significant decrease in homeownership, and the increase of non-residential property ownership in Pine Hills, Florida.

In most cases, former residents, and their descendants, react to unfavorable coverage with backlash, echoing negative stereotypes and discrediting successes of community-led efforts to address poverty-related crimes, and general insecurity. This phenomenon has since been coined, "The Crime Hills narrative" by Pine Hills Partnership Inc., a local 501(c)3 organization dedicated to the area.

In October 2020, local news reports indicated the area suffered a six-month gang war that had killed five people, including a three-year-old child. Although, the same period in question saw a significant spike in violent crimes, and notable shootings, across Orange County, and Greater Orlando.
