= Drive (golf) =

Type of shot in golf

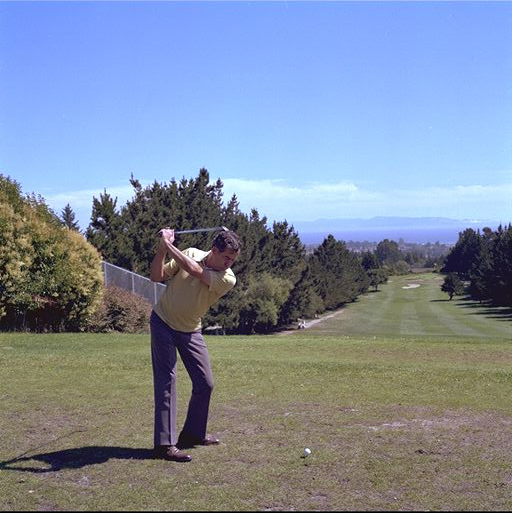
A golf drive

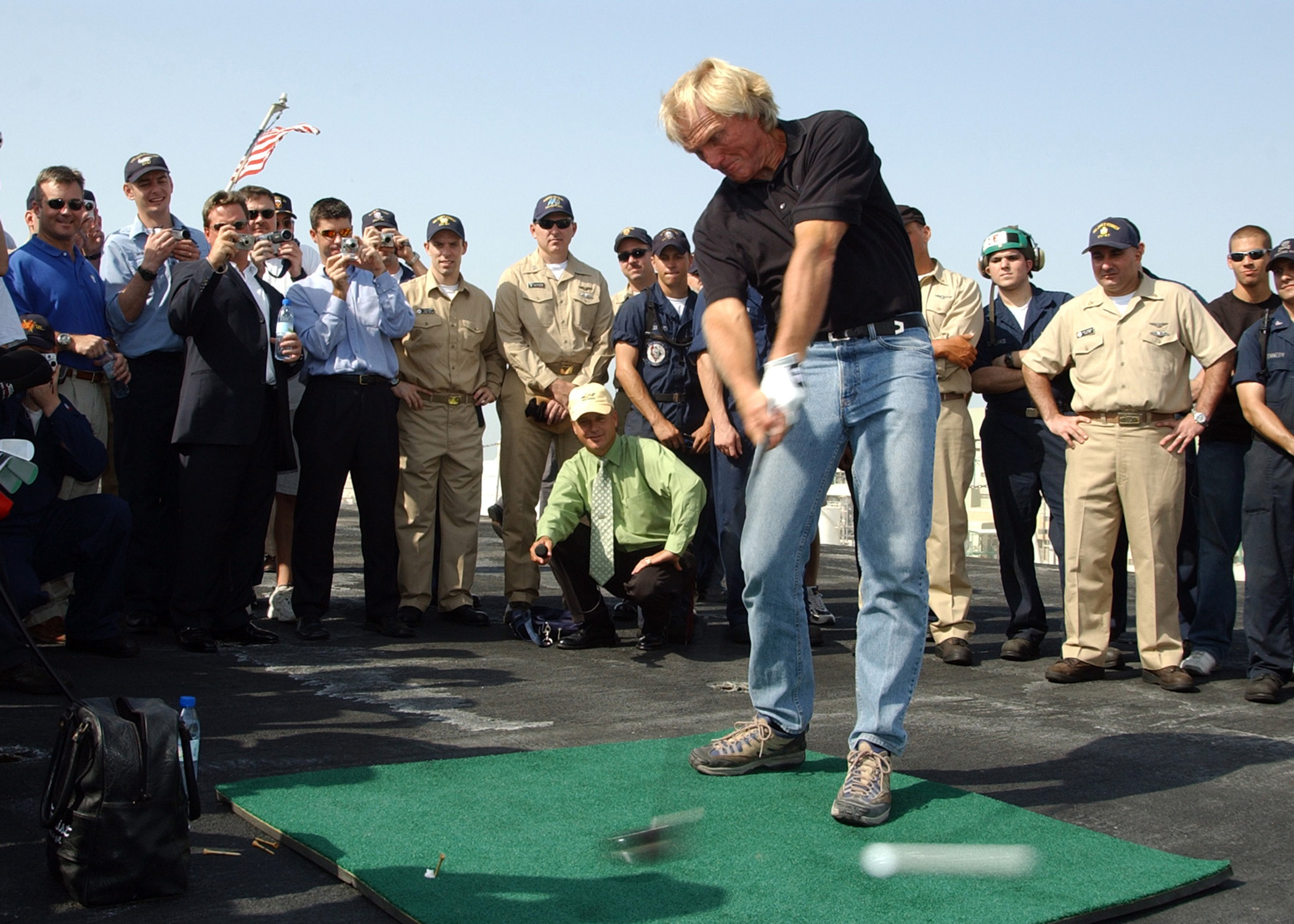
Professional golfer Greg Norman drives a golf ball off the flight deck of USS John F. Kennedy (CV67)

In golf stroke mechanics, a drive, also known as a tee shot, is a long-distance shot played from the tee box, intended to move the ball a great distance down the fairway towards the green.

== Longest drives ==
The world record recognized by Guinness World Records as the longest drive is 515 yards (471 m) by 39-year-old Rob Tinkler in 2025 at the Burstead Golf Club

The top 115 longest hitters on the PGA tour in 2017 averaged a drive of 290 yards or over. Some of the biggest hitters on the female tour, such as Maude-Aimee Leblanc, average just below 280 yards. As of 2011, Watson had the longest average drive in professional golf, with an average drive of 315.2 yards, capable of generating a ball speed of 194 mph and drives of up to 370 yards.

On the 2019 PGA Tour, the average driving distance was 293.8 yards, a 2.3 yard drop attributed to weather conditions.

Mike Austin holds the world record for the longest drive in professional play, driving 515 yards at the Winterwood Golf Course in Las Vegas, Nevada, in 1974, blasting it 65 yards past the flag on the par-4 fifth. His golf swing, known as The Mike Austin Swing, is practiced and taught by current golf professionals. Other notable swings are Ben Hogan's swing, Jim Furyk's swing, and Tiger Woods' swing.

Golf driving is big business in the United States and golf driving instruction is a multi-million-dollar business with many manuals and instructors offering their expertise to maximize the drives of their consumers.

According to professionals, flexibility, technique and form are very important in a drive, as a flexible player is able to generate a longer drive by having the ability to swing with a wider arc to get the club up to a greater speed and thereby impart more momentum to the ball. Some of the world's longest drivers who are not professional golfers but compete in Long Drive contests such as the RE/MAX World Long Drive Championship, such as Jamie Sadlowski and Mike Dobbyn, are capable of regularly hitting a ball over 400 yards and over 220 mph.

Two-time World Long Drive champion Sadlowski is of average height and slight of build but is able to generate drive distances of up to 445 yards, far beyond those of some of the more powerfully built professional golfers, because of his unique flexibility and leanness of build. Motion Golf, a company that creates sophisticated 3D swing animations of players, has deduced that in his swing he rotates his shoulder 166 degrees, but his hips move only 49 degrees; Tiger Woods averages around 85 degrees in comparison. He claims that the secret behind his unusually long drive is to "Think swing fast, not hard."

However, the official world record holder, Mike Dobbyn, whose longest drive is a world record 551 yards, is 6 ft 8 in and a muscular 310 pounds, implying that raw power is also very important, particularly in the left shoulder and right pectoral (for a right-handed golfer) and in the twitch muscles on the left side. Several of the past RE/MAX winners, such as Sweden's Viktor Johansson, have also been at least 6 ft 5 in and near 300 pounds and five-time winner Jason Zuback was an amateur powerlifter.

In February 1971, astronaut Alan Shepard became the first person to golf anywhere other than Earth. He smuggled a golf club and two golf balls on board Apollo 14 with the intent to golf on the Moon.
