= Golf swing =

Action of a golf player hitting the ball with a golf club

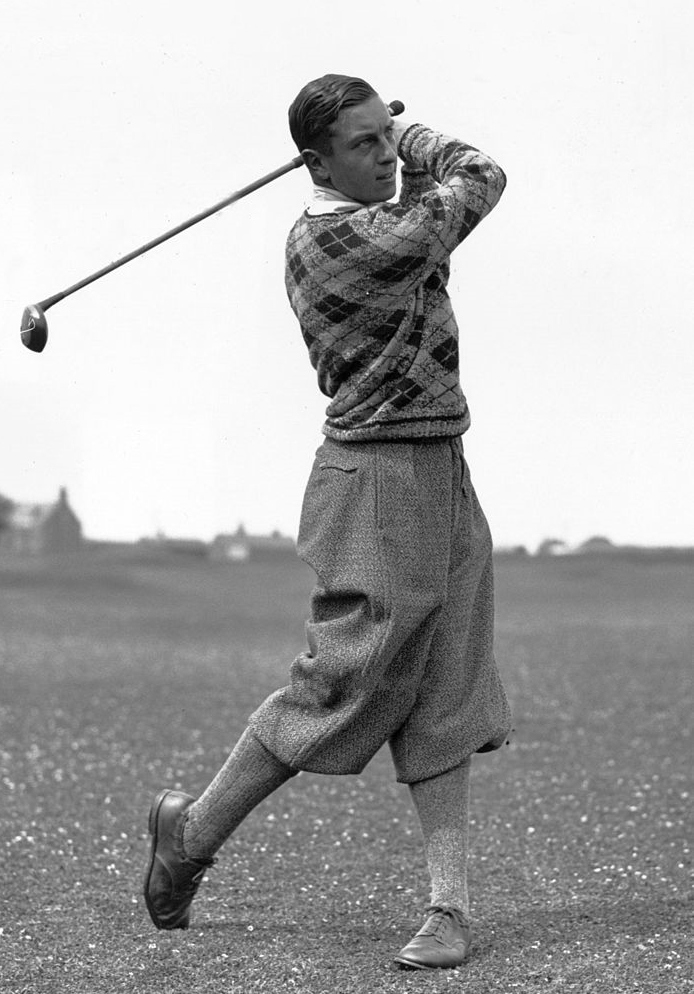
Post swing pose for golfer Henry Cotton in 1931

The golf swing is the action by which players hit the ball in the sport of golf. The golf swing is a complex motion involving the whole body; the technicalities of the swing are known as golf stroke mechanics.

There are differing opinions on what constitutes a "good" golf swing. In Work and Power Analysis of the Golf Swing, Nesbit and Serrano suggest the golf swing has been studied by scientists and mathematicians who have developed various equations to help explain the complexity of the swing. It is generally agreed that a successful and consistent golf swing requires precise timing and mechanics, from the grip and position of one's fingers, to the position and movement of the feet. At any moment of the swing, whether back-swing, downswing, or upswing, something can go wrong that will throw off the whole body and result in a mishit. The entire swing motion should move on a plane in a fluid manner. The plane can be characterized as horizontal or vertical.

Slow motion video of a person practicing a golf swing, 2023

== Complex motion ==
The goal of the golf swing is to direct kinetic energy into the club head so when it comes into contact with the ball, the energy will transfer to the ball, sending it into flight. Before a swing is taken golfers first adopt their stance. This is usually a partial crouch because it allows for a more effective range of movement whilst also preloading the muscles. The stance is critical in making sure that the golfer has a low center of gravity in order that they may remain balanced throughout the swing path. The swing starts with the arms moving back in a straight line. When the club head reaches the level of the hip, two things happen: there is a stern wrist cock that acts as a hinge along with the left knee (for a right-handed swing), building up its torque by moving into the same line as the belly button before the start of the upswing. As the swing continues to the top of the backswing (again for right-handed golf swing), the golfer's left arm should be perfectly straight and his right arm should be hinged at the elbow.

The downswing begins with the hips and the lower body rather than the arms and upper body, with emphasis on the wrist cock. As the golfer's hips shift towards the target and begin rotate, the right elbow will drop straight down, hugging the right side of the golfer's torso. As the right elbow drops, the wrists begin to snap through from the wrist cock in the backswing. A solid extension of the arms and good transfer of body should put the golfer leaning up on his right toe, balanced, with the golf club resting on the back of the golfers neck. Importantly, all of the movements occur with precise timing, while the head remains completely still with eyes focused on the ball throughout the entire swing.

=== Musculature ===
A golf stroke uses muscles in the core (especially erector spinae muscles and latissimus dorsi muscle when turning), hamstrings, shoulders and wrists. Stronger muscles in the wrists can prevent the wrists from being twisted throughout the swing, while stronger shoulders increase the turning force. Weak wrists can also deliver the impact to elbows and even the neck and lead to injury of both. (When a muscle contracts, it pulls equally from both ends and, in order to have movement at only one end of the muscle, other muscles must come into play to stabilize the bone to which the other end of the muscle is attached.) Golf is a unilateral exercise that can break body balances, requiring exercise to keep the balance in muscles. One recommended exercise is free weight training, which is not reliant on machines to stimulate and balance the fine muscles.

==== Posture ====
- A good golf swing involves having proper posture. This usually means setting up and moving in a balanced and athletic fashion. Proper posture is greatly aided by adopting a good stance to begin with: slightly crouched, with legs slightly bent and the back relatively straight. The width of the stance should be about shoulder wide and the arms should be hanging free. Golfers should have their weight on the balls of their feet.
- Slightly more weight is placed on the front foot for short irons, with balance shifting onto both feet through the middle irons until weight is distributed fairly evenly for long irons and woods.

==== Alignment ====
The ball and left foot stay at the same location, while the right foot and stance is widen for longer clubs.

- At address the body is positioned parallel to the target line, although stance can be adjusted for different shots; in general the body and stance should be parallel to the target line.
- The ball is positioned near the center of the player's stance for short irons, moving forward of center through the middle and long irons until it is opposite the heel of the front foot for woods.

==== Grip ====
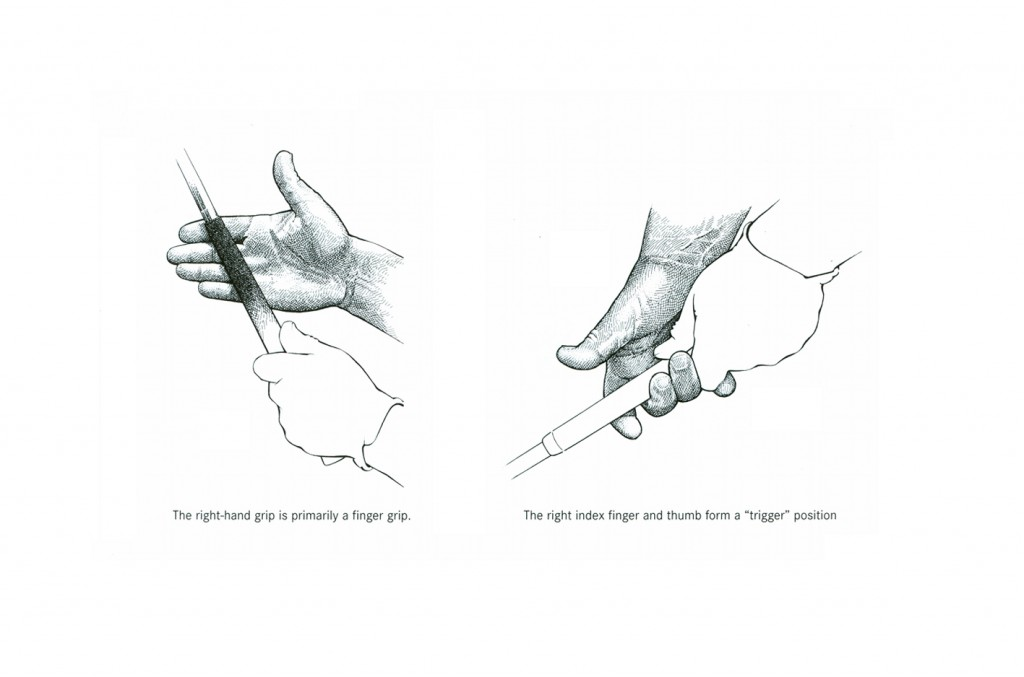
Vardon grip

- There are several choices with regard to gripping the club. Generally one of the following three will be used:

- Vardon overlap (or overlapping) grip: Named for Harry Vardon, the man who popularized it, the little finger of the trailing hand (the dominant hand) is placed between the index and middle finger of the lead hand (the non-dominant hand). The lead-hand thumb fits along the lifeline of the trailing hand.
- Interlocking grip: The little finger of the trailing hand is intertwined with the index finger of the lead hand. The lead-hand thumb fits in the lifeline of the trailing hand.
- Ten finger (or baseball) grip: The little finger of the trailing hand is placed close to the index finger of the lead hand. The lead-hand thumb is covered with the lifeline of the trailing hand.

=== Timing ===
Timing is the most critical element of the golf swing because it connects all of the different moving parts of the body into one motion. The golf swing follows a double pendulum model, where the arms and shoulders become the first pendulum and movements along the hands, grip, and shaft form the second. Both of these interlocking pendulum movements must be timed correctly in order to reach maximum club head speed.

"On the backswing a.k.a. the first part of the swing, the order of movement goes like this: hands, arms, shoulders, hips" (Ben Hogan: Five Lessons: the Modern Fundamentals). The downswing (the second part of the swing) is initiated by the shifting and unwinding of the hips. Then the shoulders and arms follow.

=== Power ===
The golf swing is capable of producing great force, though it takes practice to be able to effectively utilize it in a productive manner. Most amateur golfers try to get as much power as possible, and try to hit the ball as far as possible, but this is not an appropriate approach for an amateur. The power of the golf swing is not unlocked by muscle or by fastest club head speed, but by the precise timing and mechanics of a motion that has to be put together in harmony. However, more power in the golf swing can be attributed to the development of these lower limb muscles: tibialis anterior, peroneus longus, gastrocnemius medialis, gastrocnemius lateralis, biceps femoris, semitendinosus, gluteus maximus, vastus medialis, rectus femoris and vastus lateralis. With more power, comes the necessity for more control over the body that a golfer must have to control the motions of the swing. "Strength and inertial variations seem more likely than size to account for long and short hitting".

== Stroke types ==
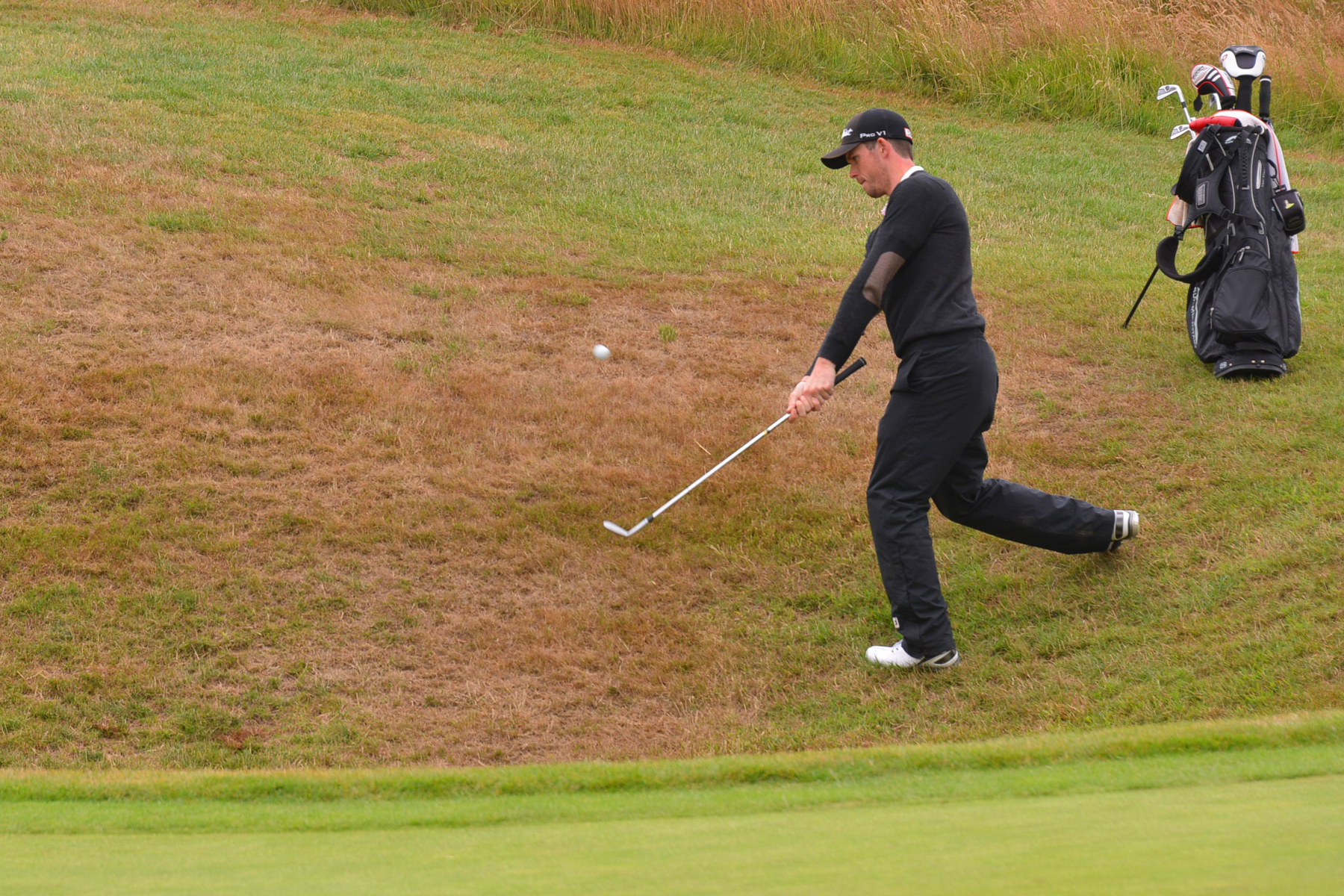
Callum Aird's chipping, 2013

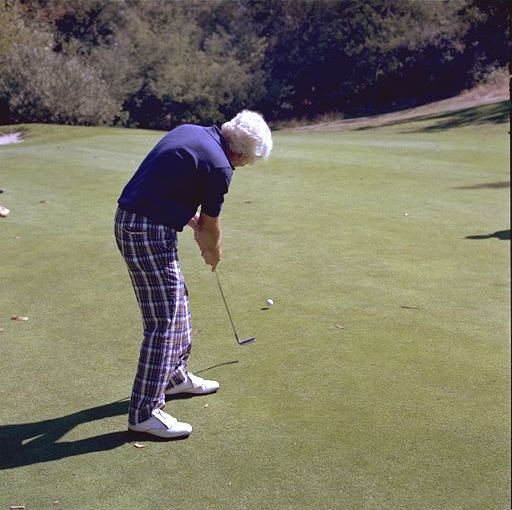
Putting by a right-handed golfer

=== Chip ===
The chip is a type of shot generally used from short range around the green usually under 40 yards. Although any club may be used, and there are specialist chipping clubs (or chippers) available, a short iron or wedge is most common.

The goal of the chip is to land the ball safely on the green and let it roll out towards the hole.

=== Pitch ===
A "pitch shot" is a shot played with a high lofted club, a lob wedge, sand wedge, gap wedge, or pitching wedge, with lofts ranging from 49° to 62°. These high lofted clubs are designed to hit the ball high from short distances, usually from 30–70 yards (30–60 m) and closer.

=== Putt ===
The putt is used for putting the ball in the hole or closer to the hole (as in lagging) from the green or the fringe of the green. It can also be done from off the fringe and from in the fairway, especially on Bermuda Grass. The putter is used for the putt. The golfer adjusts their putt to fit the circumstances of the play such as distance to the hole and slope of the green.

The face of the club starts square to the target line. The club goes straight back and straight through along the same path like a pendulum. One strategy is to aim the ball 10% past the hole. Another is to look at the hole for long putts instead of the ball.

== Shots ==
=== List of shots ===
- A drive is a long-distance shot played from the tee box, intended to move the ball a great distance down the fairway towards the green.
- An approach shot is made with the intention of placing the ball on the green. The term "approach" typically refers to a second or subsequent shot with a shorter-range iron depending on the distance required.
- A lay-up shot is made from the fairway after the drive, but intended to travel a shorter distance than might normally be expected and/or with a higher degree of accuracy, due to intervening circumstances. Most often, a lay-up shot is made to avoid hitting the ball into a hazard placed in the fairway, or to position the ball in a more favorable position on the fairway for the next shot.
- A chip is a very short shot played from near the green, generally made with an abbreviated swing motion. Chip shots are used as short approach shots to the green.
- A pitch is slightly longer than a chip shot and thus requires a slightly larger swing. It is generally hit with a lofted club and expected to stop fairly quickly once reaching the green.
- A bunker shot is a shot played from a sand trap. It is hit with a lofted wedge and is intended to hit the ball high so that it can carry over the lip of the bunker while still staying on the green.
- A flop shot is when a player opens the club face on a chip shot to get the ball to fly over an obstacle and stop quickly or spin back once it hits the ground.
- A putt is a shot designed to roll the ball along the ground. It is normally made on the putting green using a putter, though other clubs may be used to achieve the same effect in different situations. A lag is a long putt designed less to try to place the ball in the cup than to simply move the ball closer to the hole for an easier putt into the hole.
- A bank shot is a shot played from close to a green with a steep bank confronting the player, in which the ball is played so as to pitch on the face of the bank and go over it, either running or on the bounce.

=== Secondary characteristics ===
- A draw is a stroke played with the effect that, for a right-handed player, the ball moves from right to left during flight. Conversely the ball will move from left to right for a left-handed player. These characteristics are achieved with sidespin by either an in-to-out swingpath or a closed clubface, relative to the swingpath, at impact.
- A fade is a stroke played with the effect that, for a right-handed player, the ball moves from left to right during flight. Conversely the ball will move from right to left for a left-handed player. These characteristics are achieved by having either an out-to-in swingpath or an open clubface, relative to the swingpath, at impact, again due to sidespin.
- A punch or knock-down shot is one with a low trajectory, that is employed when hitting into the wind or in order to avoid hitting the ball into overhead obstructions. This stroke is achieved by keeping the weight forward and the hands ahead of the clubhead through impact.

=== Misplayed shots ===
- A hook occurs when the clubface is closed relative to the swingpath or with an inside-out swingpath and thus flies severely from right to left for a right-handed player, or vice versa for a left-handed player. Skilled players can hook the ball at will, but most commonly it is a misplayed shot that often has negative consequences.
- A slice occurs when the clubface is open relative to the swingpath or with an outside-in swingpath and thus flies severely from left to right for a right-handed player, or vice versa for a left-handed player. Skilled players can slice the ball at will, but most commonly it is a misplayed shot that often has negative consequences.
- A push is a ball whose flight path is straight, with negligible sidespin, that ends up right of the target. The incidence angle of the clubface is x° to the right of the target, and where the path of the clubface is also x° to the right of the target (inside to outside path).
- A pull is a ball whose flight path is straight, with negligible sidespin that ends up left of the target. The incidence angle of the clubface is x° to the left of the target, and where the path of the clubface is also x° to the left of the target (outside to inside path).
- A shank occurs when the ball is struck on the heel of the club, and thus flies at a sharp angle to the right of the intended direction (or vice versa for a left-handed player).
- A thin shot occurs when the forward edge of the clubhead strikes the ball too high, causing the shot to fly low, sometimes even causing it to travel across the ground, and usually comes up short of the target. A skull is a type of thinned shot, typically with a wedge or around the green, that travels well beyond the target.
- A top occurs when the player strikes the top half of the golf ball causing it to dribble along the ground and come up severely short of the intended target.
- A fat shot occurs when the forward edge of the clubhead strikes the ground behind the ball first, causing the shot to come up short of the target.
- A pop-up (or sky) occurs when the ball strikes too highly on the clubface, causing the shot to travel very high, leaving it well short of its intended target.
- A whiff (or air shot) occurs when the golfer swings and misses the ball.
- A duff occurs when the golfer makes contact with the top half of the ball on follow through and then it proceeds to bounce along the ground or when the golfer chunks the golf ball causing it to bounce

== Other definitions ==
- Backspin is imparted due to the golf club's loft and the clubhead speed at impact.
- Sidespin is imparted due to the non-perpendicularity of the golf club or the path of the clubhead.

== See also ==
- Golf instruction
- Driving range
- Mike Austin Swing
- Ben Hogan's swing
- Jim Furyk's swing
- Tiger Woods' swing
