= Maynard Evans High School =

Location
- 4949 Silver Star Road; Orlando, Florida; United States; 28.579477°N 81.449167°W

Information
- Type: Public School
- Motto: "A Place of High Achievement!"
- Established: 1955
- Principal: Kenya Nelson-Warren
- Teaching staff: 109.00 (FTE)
- Grades: 9th-12th
- Enrollment: 2,403 (2023–2024)
- Student to teacher ratio: 22.05
- Colors: Green, black and white
- Athletics: Football, Basketball, Baseball & Softball, Soccer, Weightlifting, Flag Football, Track & Field, Volleyball, Lacrosse, Golf, Wrestling, Swim team
- Mascot: Trojans
- Rival: Jones High School, Oak Ridge High School, Winter Park High School, Wekiva High School
- Website: evanshs.ocps.net

Maynard Evans High School is a high school located in Orlando, Florida, United States, served by Orange County Public Schools. The school's name is often shortened to "Evans High School" or "E-HIGH", and the mascot for the school are the Trojans.

It primarily serves students from Pine Hills, in addition to some students from nearby Clarcona and Lockhart. The original main campus is located on Silver Star Road at the intersection of Pine Hills Road. Starting in 2010, the entire school was demolished and completely rebuilt; with construction completed in December 2011. The new campus reopened in 2012.

Evans High's academic performance, based upon results of the Florida Comprehensive Assessment Test (FCAT), was consistently rated at a "D" or "F". However, the school improved in 2011 by earning a "C" for the first time in the school's history.

As of the 2012-2013 school year, Evans received its first "B" in the school's history.

The 9th Grade Center served as the main campus during construction, and the new campus was opened for classes on January 3, 2012.

== History ==
Plans to build a new high school in Pine Hills began in the early 1950s. Until then, students in Pine Hills were bussed to Edgewater High School, Apopka High School and, to a lesser extent, Winter Park High School. Evans High opened in 1958 with grades 7, 8 and 9 and was officially named "Maynard Evans High School". It was named in honor of a local pharmacist, Maynard Evans, who owned a pharmacy and soda shop in downtown Orlando named "Evans Pharmacy". The following year, grades 10, 11 and 12 were added. The first graduating class was the Class of 1960.

Evans High was built during the height of segregation and it wasn't until 1971 when the school was finally desegregated.

During the 1960s and into the 1970s, the campus grew to include a gymnasium, media center, auditorium, and a stadium shared by Edgewater High School named the "Double E Stadium".

In the 1980s up until the mid-1990s, Evans High was one of the largest schools in Orange County. The student population peaked at 4,500 and in 1993 the 9th Grade Center opened 3 miles (4.8 km) to the west of the main campus. Evans' demographics also began to change in the 1980s as newer high schools were constructed on its periphery, removing previous students from its catchment area. This also coincided with a demographic shift in its core catchment area of Pine Hills as that community fell into decline. Today, as a near total reversal from its pre-1971 status, the school is now minority majority.

By 2005, declining conditions on the main campus proved detrimental to the students' education. The Orange County school board planned to build a new $37 million school on board owned land adjacent to the 9th Grade Center Campus. This plan was met with fierce opposition by the mayor of Ocoee and nearby residents; prompting the Orange County Board of County Commissioners to reject the school board's plan in 2008. The school board thus decided to build a new school on the main campus at a cost of $75 million. The 9th Grade Center served as the main campus during construction and the new campus was opened for classes on January 3, 2012. The 9th Grade center is supposedly being used as "Trojan academy".

== Demographics ==
In the 2007–2008 school year, the racial makeup of the Evans student body is: 84% Black, 9% Hispanic, 3% White, and 2% Asian and Pacific Islander. (Source: FL Dept. of Education, 2007–2008). Evans High School has the largest percentage of Haitian students in Orlando.

== Athletics ==
Evans High's historic rivalry is with Jones High School. The Evans High School basketball team were the 1975 Class 5A State Champions.

Evans High School's football team was the 1991 Class 5A State Champions.

Evans High also features baseball, basketball, volleyball, bowling, track, lacrosse, wrestling, soccer, and swimming.

In 2016, the Evans High School girls' wrestling team finished the season 4th in the state.

== The Green Machine ==
Evans High School's marching band is called "The Green Machine", their motto is discipline pride respect and their motto is "The Best Band in the Land".

== Notable alumni ==
- Maurice Allen (golfer), professional golfer, first African-American to win the Volvik World Long Drive Championship in 2018; held the Guinness World Record for golf ball speed.
- Chucky Atkins, NBA basketball player
- Dick Batchelor, Democratic congressman for Florida’s 43rd district
- Kerry Blackshear Jr. (born 1997), basketball player in the Israeli Basketball Premier League
- Kerlin Blaise, NFL player
- Horace Copeland, former NFL player Tampa Bay Buccaneers, Miami Dolphins and Oakland Raiders
- Darryl Dawkins, former NBA player, first NBA draftee out of high school
- Jamie Dukes, former NFL player Atlanta Falcons, Green Bay Packers, Arizona Cardinals
- Charles McArther Emmanuel, son of Liberian president Charles Taylor and convicted war criminal
- Eric Griffin (born 1990), basketball player for Hapoel Be'er Sheva of the Israeli Basketball Premier League
- Tommi Hill, football player, Birmingham Stallions
- Kenard Lang, NFL player, Denver Broncos
- Tony McCoy, NFL player
- Brian McKnight, singer and producer
- Dimitri Patterson, NFL player, Washington Redskins, Minnesota Vikings, Kansas City Chiefs, Philadelphia Eagles
- Leon Searcy, NFL player
- Derrick Sharp, American-Israeli professional basketball player; at Evans, was First-Team All-Metro in basketball.
- Brandon Siler, NFL player
- Darrell Williams, NFL player, Los Angeles Rams
- Jeff Zimmerman, NFL player, Dallas Cowboys
