= David Mobley (golfer) =

American golfer

David Mobley is an American professional long driver. One of the world's longest drivers, Mobley gained REMAX championship wins in 2004 and 2011, and has appeared over 20 times in the REMAX world championships.

Mobley has been ranked #1 in the world by Long Drivers of America in 2003, 2004, and 2005.
