= Chloe Garner =

South African golfer

Chloe Garner (born October 21, 1990) is a World Long Drive competitor from Somerset West, South Africa, currently residing in Johnson City, Tennessee. Garner competes in events that are sanctioned by the World Long Drive Association, which is owned by Golf Channel.

== World Long Drive career ==
Garner won her first televised World Long Drive Tour event at the 2017 Clash in the Canyon (Nevada), and is a two-time runner-up at the Volvik World Long Drive Championship (2016 and 2018). On September 4, 2019, Garner won the World Long Drive Championship in Oklahoma, beating world ranked number one Phillis Meti with a drive of 347 yards.

== Outside of World Long Drive ==
In addition to World Long Drive, she is a CrossFit coach, and has previously competed in the CrossFit Games. Prior to getting into World Long Drive, Garner played collegiate golf at East Tennessee State University and Texas A&M University. Upon graduating from college, Garner focused solely on training heavily for CrossFit and did not touch a golf club for three years. Upon hearing that a WLD pro used CrossFit as training, she decided to pursue the long drive challenge.

She previously served as an assistant golf coach at East Tennessee State and has been in a doctoral program there studying global sports leadership. She also works as an academic specialist for the school's athletic program at large while also volunteering as a strength and conditioning coach for the women's golf team.
