= Maurice Allen (golfer) =

American long-drive golfer

Maurice Allen (born November 20, 1981) is an American long-drive golfer and the winner of the World Long Drive Championship.

== Early life and education ==
Allen grew up in Pine Hills, Florida, an unincorporated community in the Orlando metropolitan area. He attended Maynard Evans High School, where he participated in varsity football, volleyball, and track and field. Allen later attended the University of South Florida before transferring to Florida A&M University.

== Long drive career ==
Allen began competing in professional long-drive events in 2010 at the age of 28. In 2012, he set a Guinness World Records for the fastest recorded golf ball speed at 211 mph.

In 2015, Allen won long-drive competitions in Belgium, Italy, and Sweden. In 2016, he won events in Czechia, the Netherlands, New Zealand, and Slovenia.

During the 2017 World Long Drive Association season, Allen won events including the Catawba Classic in North Carolina, the Tennessee Shootout, and the Mile High Showdown in Colorado. He was ranked No. 1 in the World Long Drive rankings ahead of the 2017 World Long Drive Championship.

Allen won the 2018 Volvik World Long Drive Championship on September 5 at WinStar World Casino & Resort in Thackerville, Oklahoma. He hit a 393-yard drive in the championship match against Justin Moose to secure the title.

== Community involvement ==
Allen has worked with the Orlando Minority Youth Golf Association in Orlando, Florida. He has also served as a golf ambassador for the Boys & Girls Clubs of America and as an ambassador for the American Cancer Society's Real Men Wear Pink campaign.

Following his 2018 world championship victory, Orange County officials recognized Allen with a proclamation declaring a “Maurice Allen Day” in recognition of his establishment of four $5,000 scholarships at Maynard Evans High School.
