= Sandra Carlborg =

Swedish World Long Drive competitor

Sandra Johanna Maria Carlborg (born November 18, 1983) is a World Long Drive competitor from Alingsås, Sweden. Carlborg competes in events that are sanctioned by the World Long Drive Association, which is owned by Golf Channel, part of the NBC Sports Group, and a division of Comcast. The season-long schedule features events airing live on Golf Channel, culminating in the Volvik World Long Drive Championship in September.

Carlborg is a record five-time Volvik World Long Drive champion, having won the annual title in 2011, 2012, 2014, 2015 and 2017.

== World Long Drive career ==
Carlborg first competed in World Long Drive in 2008. She continued to compete on professional golf tours as well until focusing solely on the WLD competition starting in 2016.

Carlborg’s first two championship wins came in Mesquite, Nev., and her third – in 2014 – just up the road in Las Vegas. Carlborg’s 2015 and 2017 world championships took place at WinStar World Casino & Resort in Thackerville, Okla. Carlborg’s most recent World Long Drive Tour event win came at the 2018 Atlantic City Boardwalk Bash (Atlantic City, N.J.).

She has topped the coveted 400-yard barrier in competition with a 401-yard drive at the 2017 Mile High Showdown.

== Before World Long Drive ==
Carlborg first learned to play golf as an 11-year-old in her native Sweden and started competing the next year. She dominated girls youth golf in Scandinavia during the 1990s.

She turned professional in 2004 and joined the Ladies European Tour in 2005. Her best result was a 14th-place finish. She went on to compete in the LET Access Series, Sunshine Ladies Tour and the Swedish Golf Tour, all of which she had modest success.

== Personal life ==
Carlborg also is a personal trainer and enjoys skiing.
