= Justin James (golfer) =

American golfer (born 1990)

Justin James (born March 17, 1990, in Ponte Vedre Beach, Fla.) is a World Long Drive competitor. James competes in events that are sanctioned by the World Long Drive Association, which is owned by Golf Channel, part of the NBC Sports Group, and a division of Comcast. The season-long schedule features events airing live on Golf Channel, culminating in the Volvik World Long Drive Championship in September.

James resides in Jacksonville, Fla., and won the 2017 Volvik World Long Drive Championship on Sept. 6, 2017 at WinStar World Casino & Resort in Thackerville, Okla. Upon realizing his 435-yard winning drive landed in the grid to seal his victory over Canadian Mitch Grassing in the championship round, James spontaneously ran straight toward the Championship belt, and grabbed it on his way to leaping up into the stands to celebrate the win with his wife and father.

== World Long Drive career ==
James first made his name in World Long Drive competition in 2017. In addition to his World Championship win in September, James captured the Bash for Cash (Canada) and Bluff City Shootout (Tennessee) Tour Events on the 2017 World Long Drive schedule. In August 2018, James added another Tour event win at the Tennessee Big Shots benefiting Niswonger Children's Hospital in Kingsport, Tenn., which aired live on Golf Channel.

== Before World Long Drive ==
Prior to becoming a World Long Drive competitor, James played minor league baseball in the Toronto Blue Jays organization. He was a right-handed pitcher for both the Class A Bluefield Blue Jays of the Appalachian League in 2012 and the Class A Vancouver Canadians of the Northwest League in 2013. He also graduated from Trinity Baptist College, where he later coached the golf team for two seasons. James is a TPI certified fitness professional, and was featured in Muscle & Fitness magazine.

== Personal life ==
James’ father, Gerry, formerly competed in World Long Drive, and like Justin, is a world champion, winning the Masters Division (age 45+) in 2005 and 2006.
