= World Long Drive Championship =

Annual golf event

The World Long Drive Championship is an annual long drive competition in the sport of golf. It was first held in 1974, and since 2000 has comprised Open, Masters (over-45s) and Women's events.

From 1995 to 2015, the events were owned and produced by Long Drivers of America. In 2016, Long Drivers of America was acquired by Golf Channel, who established a season-long tour of televised competitions as the World Long Drive Association (WLDA). In 2020, Golf Channel suspended the WLDA amid the COVID-19 pandemic and disclosed an intent to sell the series. A new player-run organization called the Professional Long Drivers Association (PLDA) was established the same year as a spiritual successor to the WLDA; in 2023, both the PLDA and the WLDA were acquired by GF Sports and Entertainment, with the two entities merged as World Long Drive (WLD).

Canadian Jason Zuback is the most successful competitor with five wins in the Open division, including four in a row between 1996 and 1999, and one in the Masters division. Swede Sandra Carlborg is the most successful female competitor, with five titles in the Women's division since 2011.

== Format and rules ==
Golfers are required to use a USGA-approved club with a maximum length of 48 inches. In each round, competitors have two minutes and 30 seconds to hit 6 golf balls; to be counted as a scoring shot, the ball must land in "the grid", a range that varies from 45 to 60 yards wide and 420–450 yards long. Competitors progress through group-stages to reach the final 16, which is conducted as a single-elimination tournament.

== History ==
=== 1974–1985: The early years ===
Some of the early events were held in conjunction with the PGA Championship each year, with the long drive championship being contested a day or two before the PGA's opening round.

Jim Dent won the first two events in 1974 and 1975. Evan "Big Cat" Williams won the next two events in 1976 and 1977. Andy Franks became the third two-time winner, capturing his second title in 1982 after also winning in 1979. Players from the PGA Tour often participated in some of the early long drive championships, with veteran Tour player Lon Hinkle winning the event in 1981. Of note was the creativity of 1984 champion Larry "Wedgy" Winchester who used an unconventionally long 60-inch club to register a winning drive of 319 yards and finish ahead of touring pros Hinkle and Payne Stewart, who finished second and third. Scott DeCandia won the first of his two titles in 1980.

=== 1986–1995: Parity ===
The next decade of the long drive event featured nine different champions, with only Art Sellinger managing two titles in the 10-year span (1986, 1991). DeCandia won his second title in this span with the others all being first-time champions. Sean Fister closed out this 10-year period in 1995 with the first of what would be three long drive titles for him. The longest recorded winning drive in this 10-year stretch was Darryl Anderson's 345-yard shot in 1994 but that still fell short of Williams' then-record winning drive of 353 yards in 1977.

=== 1996–2006: The Jason Zuback era ===
Zuback became the first player since Williams in the inaugural two events to win consecutive championships. In fact, Zuback won four straight from 1996-99. He later added a record fifth title (since tied in the women's division by Sandra Carlborg) in 2006. Zuback also was the first to crack the 400-yard barrier with a winning drive of 412 yards in his second win in 1997. The former pharmacist also received a $50,000 first-place check for the 1997 victory, the first winner to eclipse that amount. After his four straight titles and a runner-up finish in 2000, Zuback was inducted into the Alberta Sports Hall of Fame. Clayton Burger became the second to top the 400-yard mark with his winning shot of 402 yards in 2003. Fister added his second and third championship belts with wins in 2001 and 2005, joining Zuback as the only men to win three or more titles. Former Big Ten champion javelin thrower Carl Wolter (Penn State) won the first of his two titles in 2002 in a major upset, having just taken up the game of golf three months prior to the event.

=== 2007–2019: 400 plus yards becomes the norm ===
The 400-yard mark was topped by eight champions in the next 11 years with Justin James establishing a tournament-record mark of 435 yards in capturing the 2017 championship. James' record-breaking drive turned out to be much more than he needed. After his finals competitor missed the grid on all eight of his drives, James only needed to keep one in play at a minimum distance of 270 yards. He easily topped that distance and set the record for the longest winning drive in the tournament's 42-year history. This 11-year time frame also featured four two-time winners with Jamie Sadlowski going back-to-back in 2008 and 2009, Joe Miller winning in 2010 and 2016, former University of Miami baseball pitcher Tim Burke in 2013 and 2015 and Kyle Berkshire claiming the World Long Drive title in 2019. In addition, Wolter won his second title in 2011. First-time winners in this time period also included Mike Dobbyn in 2007, Ryan Winther in 2012, Jeff Flagg in 2014 and Maurice Allen in 2018.

In 2015, the Long Drivers of America was acquired by NBC Sports via its Golf Channel division. The acquisition was intended as a means to bolster Golf Channel's live event programming beyond tournament coverage, expanding the championship to a televised tour of multiple events per-season as the World Long Drive Association (WLDA). By 2019, the WLDA's tour consisted of six televised events per-season, culminating with the World Long Drive Championship.

=== 2020–present: Suspension of operations, ownership changes ===
Amid the COVID-19 pandemic, the WLDA cancelled most of its 2020 season. The World Long Drive Championship was still provisionally scheduled to be held in September, but it was later postponed indefinitely amid a need to find "a long-term partner to manage the sport moving forward." In July 2020, it was reported that Golf Channel was seeking to sell the WLDA entirely, citing "the current environment and challenges" and an effort to focus on its core media operations.

A group led by long drive coach Bobby Peterson would later establish a new player-run sanctioning body known as the Professional Long Drivers Association (PLDA), which would rely primarily on funding via entry fees rather than external partnerships. The 2020 PLDA National Championship was held in Memphis, Tennessee, with former WLDA champion Kyle Berkshire winning the open division title.

In 2021, the PLDA held an 11-event season, concluding with its inaugural World Championship in Mesquite, Nevada. The tournament was headlined by the participation of 2020 U.S. Open champion Bryson DeChambeau, who was beaten in the quarter-finals by the eventual winner Berkshire. DeChambeau had befriended Berkshire in 2019 while seeking advice on improving his driving distance, and had been regularly training with him. DeChambeau also become part of the PLDA's ownership group, explaining that "these guys all have families and lives and this is usually their hobby or second job. They're just trying to survive, a lot of them are, and I think they need to be getting support. Support from the world of golf, and support financially. This is the best way for me to do that. So why wouldn't I? Why wouldn’t I do what I can to make this thing what it should be?". At the 2022 PLDA World Championship, Martin Borgmeier defeated DeChambeau in an upset victory at the open division final.

In December 2022, GF Sports and Entertainment acquired the PLDA, and then acquired the WLDC from Golf Channel the following month. The two entities were merged to form World Long Drive (WLD), with the new tour announcing a 12-event schedule for 2023 culminating with the World Long Drive Championship. The company also confirmed a new five-year broadcast deal with Golf Channel, which committed to airing 50 hours of programming from 10 events per-season.

== Winners - Open Division ==
- 1974 – Jim Dent, 324 yards
- 1975 – Jim Dent, 317 yards
- 1976 – Evan Williams, 307 yards
- 1977 – Evan Williams, 353 yards
- 1978 – John McComish, 330 yards
- 1979 – Andy Franks, 314 yards
- 1980 – Scott DeCandia, 295 yards
- 1981 – Lon Hinkle, 338 yards
- 1982 – Andy Franks, 346 yards
- 1983 – Terry Forcum, 307 yards
- 1984 – Wedgy Winchester, 319 yards
- 1985 – Dennis Paulson, 323 yards
- 1986 – Art Sellinger, 311 yards
- 1987 – Joe Walsh, 314 yards
- 1988 – Jim Maynard, 334 yards
- 1989 – Scott DeCandia, 327 yards
- 1990 – Frank Miller, 328 yards
- 1991 – Art Sellinger, 326 yards
- 1992 – Monte Scheinblum 329 yards
- 1993 – Brian Pavlet, 336 yards
- 1994 – Darryl Anderson, 345 yards
- 1995 – Sean Fister, 362 yards
- 1996 – Jason Zuback Canada 351 yards
- 1997 – Jason Zuback Canada 412 yards
- 1998 – Jason Zuback Canada 361 yards
- 1999 – Jason Zuback Canada 376 yards
- 2000 – Viktor Johansson Sweden 315 yards
- 2001 – Sean Fister USA 376 yards
- 2002 – Carl Wolter USA 384 yards
- 2003 – Clayton Burger USA 402 yards
- 2004 – David Mobley USA 377 yards
- 2005 – Sean Fister USA 377 yards
- 2006 – Jason Zuback Canada 368 yards
- 2007 – Mike Dobbyn USA 385 yards
- 2008 – Jamie Sadlowski Canada 418 yards
- 2009 – Jamie Sadlowski Canada 384 yards
- 2010 – Joe Miller UK 414 yards
- 2011 – Carl Wolter USA 409 yards
- 2012 – Ryan Winther USA 343 yards
- 2013 – Tim Burke USA 427 yards
- 2014 – Jeff Flagg USA 365 yards
- 2015 – Tim Burke USA 394 yards
- 2016 – Joe Miller UK 423 yards
- 2017 – Justin James 435 yards
- 2018 – Maurice Allen USA 393 yards
- 2019 – Kyle Berkshire 406 yards
- 2020 – Kyle Berkshire 383 yards (PLDA National Championship, first under new sanctioning body)
- 2021 – Kyle Berkshire 422 yards (PLDA World Championship, first full season of PLDA)
- 2022 – Martin Borgmeier 426 yards (PLDA World Championship)
- 2023 - Kyle Berkshire 398 yards
- 2024 - Sean Johnson 411 yards

== Winners - Senior Division ==
- 1996 – Michael Hooper 333 yards
- 1997 – Michael Hooper 371 yards
- 1998 – Michael Hooper 354 yards
- 1999 – Fred Hooter 352 yards
- 2000 – Mike Gorton 310 yards
- 2001 – Ted Fostey 357 yards
- 2002 – Pat Dempsey USA 342 yards
- 2003 – Eric Jones USA 381 yards
- 2004 – Bobby Wilson 360 yards
- 2005 – Gerry James 366 yards
- 2006 – Gerry James 378 yards
- 2007 – Frank Miller 394 yards
- 2008 – Dan Boever 366 yards
- 2009 – Bobby Wilson 374 yards
- 2010 – George Slupski 389 yards
- 2011 – David Mobley 459 yards
- 2012 – Eric Lastowka USA 355 yards
- 2013 – Stephen Kennedy 369 yards
- 2014 – Jeff Gavin (Canada) 384 yards
- 2015 – Jason Zuback 339 yards
- 2016 – Tom Peppard USA 347 yards
- 2017 – Jeff Crittenden 363 yards
- 2018 – Eddie Fernandes
- 2019 – Jeff Crittenden
- 2020 – Mile Bauman 343 yards PLDA National Championship
- 2021 – Jeff Gavin 361 yards PLDA World Championship
- 2022 – Eddie Fernandes 411 yards
- 2023 – Ryan Reisbeck 372 yards
- 2024 – Eddie Fernandes 362 yards

== Winners - Women Division ==
- 2000 – Stacey Shinnick 249 yards
- 2001 – Lee Brandon 291 yards
- 2002 – Stacey Shinnick 292 yards
- 2003 – Nancy Abiecunas 332 yards
- 2004 – Sally Dee 287 yards
- 2005 – Stacey Shinnick 311 yards
- 2006 – Phillis Meti 326 yards
- 2007 – Sheila Kelliher 329 yards
- 2008 – Lana Lawless 245 yards
- 2009 – N/A
- 2010 – N/A
- 2011 – Sandra Carlborg 285 yards
- 2012 – Sandra Carlborg 339 yards
- 2013 – Heather LeMaster 306 yards
- 2014 – Sandra Carlborg 332 yards
- 2015 – Sandra Carlborg 321 yards
- 2016 – Phillis Meti 310 yards
- 2017 – Sandra Carlborg 320 yards
- 2018 – Phillis Meti 317 yards
- 2019 – Chloe Garner 347 yards
- 2021 – Kanani Lodge 332 yards
- 2022 – Sara Owada 776 yards cumulative, 258.7 yard average (best three shots format)
- 2023 - Monica Lieving 288 yards
- 2024 - Phillis Meti 310 yards
- 2025 - Kelly Rudney 406 yards
