= Sean Fister =

American golfer

Sean “The Beast” Fister is an American golfer, and 3-time winner of the World Long Drive Championships, in 1995, 2001 and 2005. He is the first American to win the long drive world championship three times, and to eclipse the 400 yard barrier in the final, which he accomplished in 1997. He is also the oldest competitor to win the world championship at 43 years, 4 months.

He was inducted to the Long Drivers of America Hall of Fame in 2002, Poplar Bluff Sports Hall of Fame in 2005 and Arkansas Golf Hall of Fame in 2008.
