= Richie Scheinblum =

American baseball player (1942–2021)

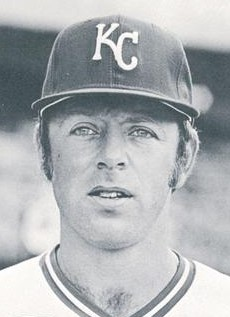
- Outfielder
- Born: November 5, 1942; New York City, New York, U.S.
- Died: May 10, 2021 (aged 78); Palm Harbor, Florida, U.S.
- Batted: Switch Threw: Right

Professional debut
- MLB: September 1, 1965, for the Cleveland Indians
- NPB: April 5, 1975, for the Hiroshima Toyo Carp

Last appearance
- MLB: September 21, 1974, for the St. Louis Cardinals
- NPB: October 21, 1976, for the Hiroshima Toyo Carp

MLB statistics
- Batting average: .263
- Home runs: 13
- Runs batted in: 127

NPB statistics
- Batting average: .295
- Home runs: 33
- Runs batted in: 118
- Stats at Baseball Reference

Teams
- Cleveland Indians (1965, 1967–1969); Washington Senators (1971); Kansas City Royals (1972); Cincinnati Reds (1973); California Angels (1973–1974); Kansas City Royals (1974); St. Louis Cardinals (1974); Hiroshima Toyo Carp (1975–1976)

Career highlights and awards
- All-Star (1972)

Richard Alan Scheinblum (November 5, 1942 – May 10, 2021), nicknamed "Shane", was an American professional Major League Baseball (MLB) player.

In 1971, he won the American Association Most Valuable Player Award after hitting a league-leading and Triple-A-record .388. In 1972 he was named to the American League All-Star team, and batted .300. He played for the Cleveland Indians, Washington Senators, Kansas City Royals, Cincinnati Reds, California Angels, and St. Louis Cardinals. He also played two seasons in Japan for the Hiroshima Toyo Carp.

== Early life ==
Scheinblum was Jewish, and was born in Hell's Kitchen in Manhattan, New York City to Fred and Lee (born in Ukraine; died in 1949) Scheinblum, and grew up in Fort Apache in the South Bronx in New York City. He was very proud that he was one of only (as he recalled it) six Jewish major leaguers at the time, along with Art Shamsky, Mike Epstein, Steve Stone, Ron Blomberg, and Ken Holtzman. His father remarried and the family moved to Englewood, New Jersey, when he was 10 years old. He attended Dwight Morrow High School in Englewood, where he played basketball and soccer, in addition to baseball.

He was a 1964 graduate of C.W. Post College, now known as LIU Post, with a degree in Business Administration. There, he was a three-sport athlete, competing in baseball, basketball, and track and field. In baseball he batted .415 in 1964, and set the C.W. Post records in career triples (12) and batting average (.395). He was inducted in the college's sports Hall of Fame in 2005.

== Baseball career ==
In 1964 he played for the Burlington Indians and hit .309 (9th in the Carolina League), in 1965 he played for the Salinas Indians and hit .318 (9th in the league) with a .460 slugging percentage (8th in the league) and had 21 doubles (9th in the league), and in 1965 he played for the Pawtucket Indians and hit .263. He made his major league debut as a September call-up with the Cleveland Indians in 1965, but was exclusively a pinch runner in his first three games. As a pinch hitter for Joe Azcue in his first MLB plate appearance with one out in the ninth inning of a 9–4 away loss to the New York Yankees on 21 September, he swung at the first pitch and reached first base safely on a fielder's choice. The runner who was retired at second on the play was Ralph Gagliano in his lone MLB appearance as an active player. Scheinblum hit .318 with the Indians in 1967, as during the rest of the season he played for the Portland Beavers and hit .291 with 77 runs (5th in the league), 25 doubles (7th in the league), and 16 home runs (8th in the league).

During the 1966–67 offseason, Scheinblum played in the Nicaraguan Professional Baseball League and led his team, Cinco Estrellas, to a championship on January 22, 1967. After the game, however, he and teammate Jim Weaver hid under the bed in Scheinblum's hotel room while bullets flew and the Nicaraguan National Guard killed between dozens and hundreds of anti-government demonstrators near the hotel room.

In 1968 he played again for Portland, and hit .304 (9th in the league) with a .479 slugging percentage and 75 RBIs (7th in the league), and in 55 at bats for the Cleveland Indians batted .218, followed by .186 in limited action the following year. In 1970 he batted .337 (5th in the league)/.424 (leading the league)/.576 (second in the league to Cesar Cedeno) for the Class AAA Wichita Aeros, leading the league in runs scored (79), hits (155), and RBIs (84), and second in the league in doubles (32), home runs (24), walks (72), and sacrifice flies (6).

Playing for the Denver Bears in 1971, he won the American Association Most Valuable Player Award after he hit a league-leading and Triple-A-record .388 with a league-leading .490 on-base percentage, 83 runs (third in the league), .725 slugging percentage (leading the league), 145 hits (third in the league), 31 doubles (tied for the league lead), 10 triples (leading the league), 25 home runs (second in the league), and 108 RBIs.

Scheinblum played outfield in the major leagues from 1965 to 1974. He was a switch-hitter.

His best year was 1972, when he hit .300 (sixth in the American League) with an on-base percentage of .383 (fifth in the league), 8 homers, and 66 RBIs for the Royals. He was named to the American League All-Star team, and was the Royals' Player of the Month in August. Following the Munich massacre in September of that year, Scheinblum wore a black armband in memory of the slain Israeli athletes. He later said, "I wore the emblematic black band ... not only because they were Jewish athletes, but because they were human beings".

Scheinblum was traded along with Roger Nelson to the Cincinnati Reds for Hal McRae and Wayne Simpson on December 1, 1972. He batted .307 with a .402 on base percentage in 1973; after a slow start for the Cincinnati Reds, he was traded to the California Angels, for whom he batted .328 with an on base percentage of .418.

He hit .263 with 13 homers and 127 RBIs in his career.

In 1976, after leaving Major League Baseball, he played for Japan's Hiroshima Toyo Carp in 1976, batting .307 (8th in the Japan Central League) with a slugging percentage of .501 and 20 home runs.

== Retirement ==
After his career, ended he went on to live in Palm Harbor, Florida. As of 2016, he was working as a salesman with a promotional products company. He died May 10, 2021, after a long illness.

== Family ==
His son, Monte Scheinblum, hit a golf ball 329 yards, 13 inches, into a 20 mile-per-hour wind to win the 1992 U.S. National Long Driving Championship, and was also the world long driving champion that year.

== See also ==
- List of Jewish Major League Baseball players
