= Phillis Meti =

New Zealand golfer

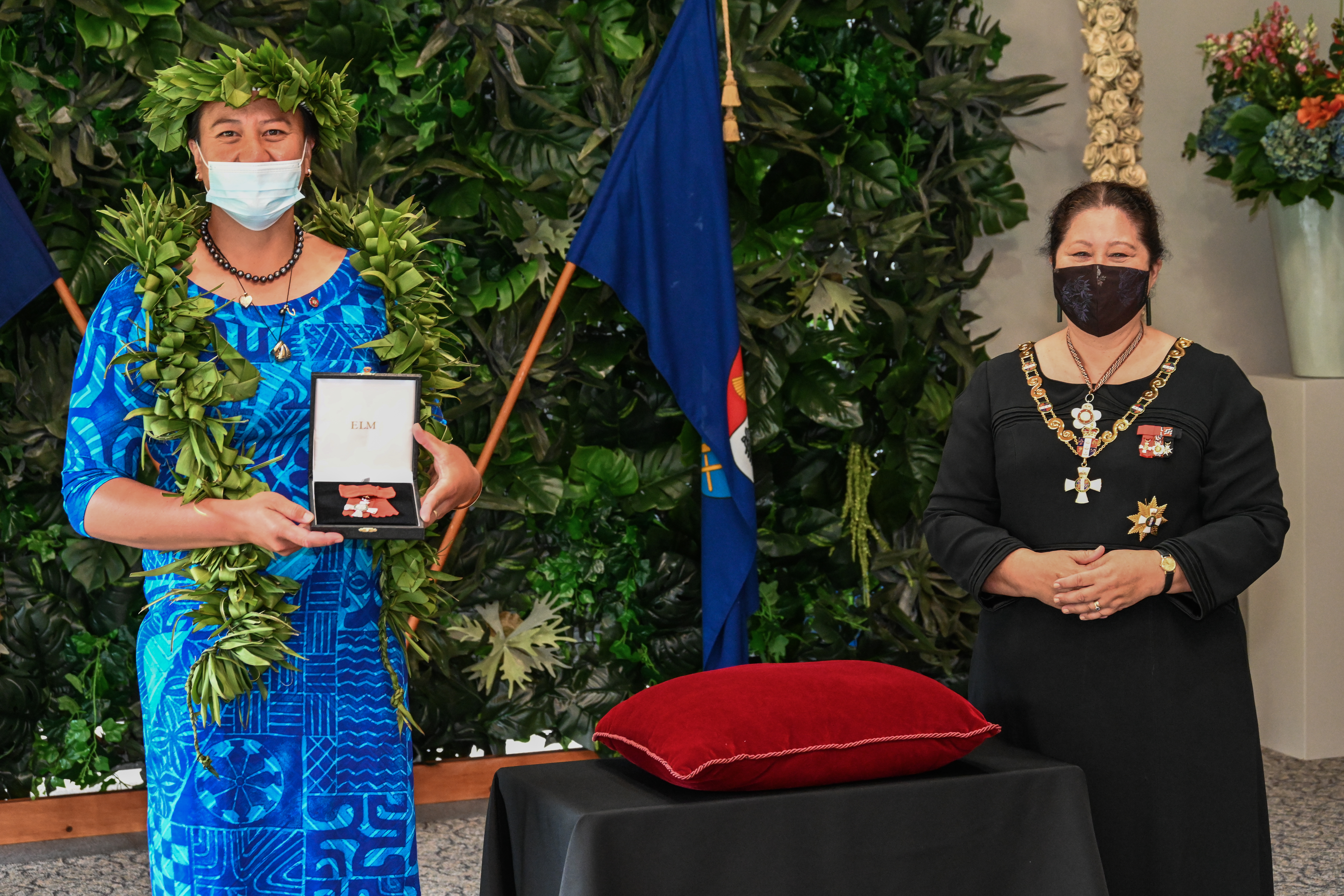
Meti (left), after her investiture as a Member of the New Zealand Order of Merit by the governor-general, Dame Cindy Kiro, at Government House, Auckland, on 17 February 2022

Phillis-Jean Meti MNZM (born 11 July 1987) is a New Zealand golfer who won the Volvik World Long Drive (WLD) championship, title in 2006, 2016, 2018, 2022 and 2024. She holds the female world record for the longest ball in WLD women's competition with distances of 406 yards in July 2017, then 408 and 413 yards in April 2019.

Born in Auckland, New Zealand, Meti was introduced to golf at age 11 by her father Raz at Redwood Park, Swanson.

== Career ==
Meti won her first WLD title in 2006 at age 19 in Mesquite, Nevada.

In 2009, she started competing in professional golf tournaments in New Zealand, Australia, China, the United States, and the South Pacific.

In 2016, Meti returned to long drive competition and won the 2016 WLD Championship In 2017, Meti achieved second place in the 2017 Mile High Showdown in Colorado. It was during this tournament that she made the record 406 yard drive in her semi-final match. Her long drive may have been aided by a bounce off a marker or sprinkler head.

In 2018, Meti won the Volvik World Long Drive Championship in 2018. That same year, she won the Ak-Chin Smash in the Sun in Arizona. Meti’s winning 380-yard drive at the last event was 30 yards longer than her nearest competition.

Meti's most recent victories took place at WinStar World Casino & Resort in Thackerville, Oklahoma.

In the 2021 Queen's Birthday Honours, Meti was appointed a Member of the New Zealand Order of Merit, for services to sport, particularly golf.
