= Mike Austin (golfer) =

American golfer (1910–2005)

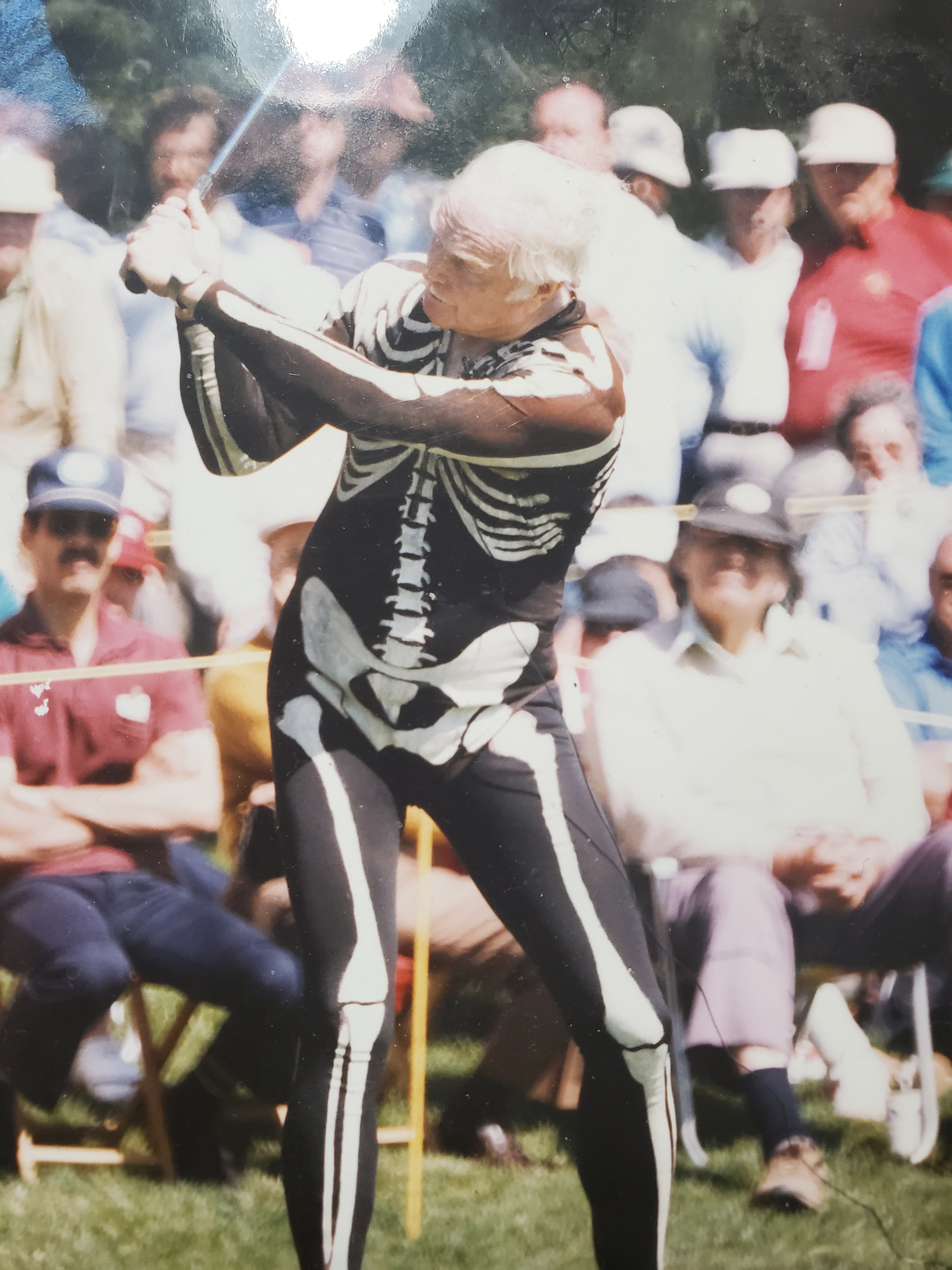
- Austin demonstrating the golf swing in a skeleton suit in the 1980s
- Born: February 17, 1910; Guernsey
- Died: November 23, 2005 (aged 95); Los Angeles, California
- Height: 6 ft 2 in (1.88 m)
- Spouse: Tonya

Michael Hoke Austin (February 17, 1910 – November 23, 2005) was an American golf professional and kinesiology expert, specializing in long drives.

He was credited by Guinness World Records with hitting the longest drive in tournament play (471 m/515 yd) in 1974 at Winterwood Golf Course (now called Desert Rose Golf Course) in Las Vegas, Nevada.

== Biography ==
Austin was born in Guernsey. By the time he was four years-old, he had moved with his family to London and then Scotland. They later emigrated to the United States, where they settled firstly in Florida and finally Georgia. Social Security records refute these biographical entries. They reflect that Michael Hoke Austin was born on February 17, 1910, and died (aged 95) on November 23, 2005. His father was born in Alabama and there are no records reflecting English or Scottish claims.

During the Depression, Austin ran a local golf shop in Atlanta during the summer. In the winter he frequented the courses farther south in Florida playing big money games against vacationing gangsters from Chicago. After the first year, they would not bet against him so he found a set of left-handed clubs and played with that handicap. The next year he played one-handed. It is also said he won a $5,000 bet by making par by hitting the ball with a Coke bottle. Through these hustles he acquired the moniker of "The Golfing Bandit."

Austin also traveled across the country performing trick shots and challenging anyone to try to outdrive him. He said he could hit a variety of shots with an ordinary set of golf clubs. He told a biographer that he "lived like a maharaja" during that time. Austin's biographer, Philip Reed, wrote that when Sam Snead first received a set of steel shafted clubs he promptly gave them to Austin saying, "You're the only one who swings fast enough to hit these."

== Moving to Hollywood ==
In the late 1930s, Austin moved to Los Angeles to become a professional at the Wilshire Country Club. When he arrived, the job fell through so he worked at other golf courses, teaching and competing. His roommate was Errol Flynn. Austin also auditioned for roles in films and eventually appeared in a number of motion pictures. However, his golfing and acting were put on hold when he joined the service. Having never completed U.S. citizenship, he went to Canada and joined the R.A.F.

Austin established a name for himself as a golf teacher and was eventually sought out by Howard Hughes for lessons. Austin eventually established a gym in Hollywood where he taught boxing, tennis, baseball and golf. The walls of the gym were covered with mirrors which he said sped up the learning process. Austin appeared in the 1983 Michael Douglas film The Star Chamber as Judge Lang. Austin also spoke several languages.

== Setting the World Record ==
For years Austin was well known by professional golfers for his length off the tee. But it was one drive in 1974 that secured his name in history. While playing in the U.S. National Seniors Tournament, at the Winterwood Golf Course (now the Desert Rose) Austin played alongside PGA Champion Chandler Harper. After hitting several 400-yard drives, Harper said, "Mike, let's see you really let one go." Austin drove the green on the 450-yard par 4. It carried to the edge of the green, bounced over and rolled past the pin and off the back edge. In a 2003 interview, Harper said he found a ball on the next tee box and called to Austin, "This is impossible, but there is a ball over here." They identified the ball as Austin's and stepped off the distance back to the center of the green. The drive was 515 yards. The Guinness World Records no longer recognizes the world's longest drive in their book.

== The Mike Austin Swing ==
The Mike Austin Swing, as shown by a sequence of high-speed photographs, while Austin wears his training device The Flammer.

Austin's golf swing, known as The Mike Austin Swing, has been practiced and taught by numerous golf professionals. It is based on the principle of "supple quickness", whereby speed is generated through relaxation of all active muscles. Austin demonstrated the power of the swing by securing the world long drive title with a 515-yard shot, using a steel-shafted persimmon wood driver, a balata-covered ball and had a 27-mph tail wind, while playing in the U.S. National Seniors Open in 1974. He was 64 years old at the time.

The Austin swing breaks from standard Professional Golf Association teaching in a number of ways:

1. The hips slide laterally rather than turning.
2. The clubhead is thrown from the top of the swing, not released at the last moment.
3. The golfer bends forward from the hips rather than bending with the knees.

Austin designed his golf swing to use the joints of the body in the way they designed. He claimed that his swing did not cause back injuries which are common among professional golfers. Late in his career, Austin changed his hand motion to a counter-rotation of the forearms that kept the club facing the target throughout the swing.

Students of Austin include World Long Drive Champion Mike Dunaway and Jaacob Bowden. Dunaway said about Austin: "He is the dean of all golf instruction from the beginning of time, as far as I'm concerned."

=== Instructors ===
Golf instructors who have taught Austin's swing include:

- Mike Dunaway
- Walter "Smiley" Jones
- Dan Shauger
- Jaacob Bowden, winner of the 2003 Pinnacle Distance Challenge with a televised 381-yard drive and multiple winner of qualifiers for the RE/MAX World Long Drive Championship, including one that set a grid record of 421 yards.
- Betsy Cullen, former LPGA Tour winner
- Heiko Falke, Mike Austin teacher since 2005, brand owner in Germany
- John Marshall, 2005–06 ALDA Super Senior National Long Driving Champion and a five-time RE/MAX World Long Drive Championship finalist.
- Steve Pratt
- Deb Vangellow

=== Instructional and related materials ===
Austin discussed setting the world record and revealed his secrets for hitting the ball long and straight in his video Golf is Mental Imagery and Austinology. His last instructional DVD was Mike Austin: Secrets of the Game's Longest Hitter, and was produced by Peace River Golf.
