= Jason Zuback =

Canadian golfer

Personal information
- Full name: Jason Zuback
- Nickname: Golfzilla
- Nationality: Canada
- Born: 24 April 1970 (age 56) Alberta, Canada
- Height: 5 ft 10 in (178 cm)
- Weight: 225 lb (102 kg)

Career
- Sport: Golf

Achievements and awards
- World Long Drive Championship: 1996, 1997, 1998, 1999, 2006
- Long Drivers of America hall of fame: 2003

Jason Zuback (born 24 April 1970) is a Canadian golfer who competed as a professional long drive athlete. Nicknamed Golfzilla, he won the World Long Drive Championship on five occasions, in 1996, 1997, 1998, 1999 and 2006. He was inducted into the Long Drivers of America hall of fame in 2003.

== Personal life ==
Zuback was raised in Lethbridge, Alberta. He attended the University of Alberta in Edmonton, where he graduated with a degree in pharmacy. He worked as a pharmacist before embarking on a full-time career in long drive.

== Long drive career ==
Zuback first entered a long drive competition in 1995 after being given the idea by playing partners while attempting to qualify for the Alberta Open. He won his first event by 50 yards. The following year, he won the World Long Drive Championship in his first attempt and returned to defend the title for three more years. He won his fifth and final world title in 2006. He returned to win the "Masters" event for over-45s in 2015.
