= Joe Miller (golfer) =

British golfer (born 1984)

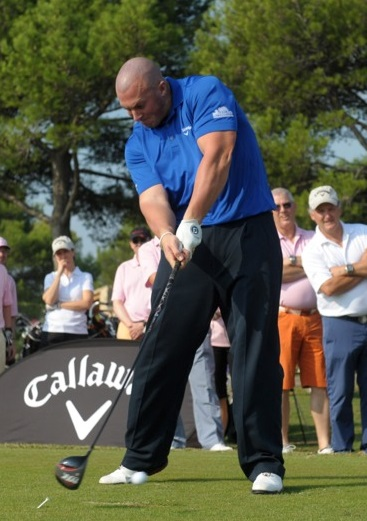

Personal information
- Full name: Joseph Miller
- Nationality: United Kingdom
- Born: 18 November 1984 (age 41)
- Height: 6 ft 4 in (193 cm)
- Weight: 19 st (266 lb; 121 kg)

Career
- Sport: Golf

Achievements and awards
- World Long Drive Championship: 2010, 2016

Joe Miller (born 18 November 1984), is a British golfer who competes as a professional long drive athlete. He has won the World Long Drive Championship on two occasions, in 2010 and 2016.

== Personal life ==
Miller was brought up in Barnet, London. Miller plays at The Shire London golf club and also works as a part-time gym trainer.

== Long drive career ==
Miller won the RE/MAX World Long Drive Championship in 2010 with a 414-yard drive. In doing so, he became the second European to win the title, and collected the $150,000 first prize. He recaptured the title in 2016; he produced a 423-yard drive in the final to collect the $125,000 first prize.
