= Monte Scheinblum =

American professional golfer (born 1967)

Personal information
- Nationality: United States
- Born: May 15, 1967 (age 59) Portland, Oregon, U.S.
- Height: 6 ft 2 in (1.88 m)
- Weight: 235 lb (107 kg; 16.8 st)

Career
- Sport: Golf
- College: UCLA
- Status: Professional
- Former tour: Nike Tour

Achievements and awards
- U.S. National Long Drive Champion: 1992
- World Long Drive Champion: 1992

Monte Scheinblum (born May 15, 1967) is an American professional golfer, and the son of former Major League Baseball All Star outfielder Richie Scheinblum. While he competed on the Nike Tour, he became known especially for his long driving, where success is achieved by a golfer hitting a golf ball the furthest. In 1992, he won the National Long Driving Championship in the United States, and was the world long driving champion.

== Early life ==
Scheinblum, who is Jewish, is the son of former Major League Baseball All Star outfielder Richie Scheinblum. His father played in the 1972 All Star Game while he was with the Kansas City Royals.

As a child, he spent two years in Japan, where his father played baseball for the Hiroshima Carp. He then lived in Orange County, California, where he attended Villa Park High School. Scheinblum turned to professional golf after an injury to his elbow in his freshman year of being a power pitcher in high school ended his dream of playing major league baseball as his father had.

== Golf ==
A 6' 2", 235-pound athlete, Scheinblum is an accomplished golfer. Between 1993 and 1996, he competed on the second tier Nike Tour (now Korn Ferry Tour), where his best finish was a tie for fifth in the 1994 Monterrey Open. He also played in one PGA Tour event, the 1996 Michelob Championship at Kingsmill, missing the cut.

Scheinblum has had his greatest success in long drive competitions. In 1991, he was the runner-up in the U.S. National Long Driving Championship with a drive of 319 yards. The following year, in Boca Raton, Florida, he won the event with a drive of 329 yards, 13 inches, into a 20 mile-per-hour wind. Mike Gorton, the 1987 champion, took second with a drive of 307 yards, 22 inches. That year, he was also the world long driving champion. In October 1993, he narrowly failed to defend his national title, finishing second to Brian Pavlett with a drive of 324 yards, 30 inches. Pavlett had hit his first three balls out of bounds before going past Scheinblum with a drive of 336 yards, 6 inches.

In September 1994, Scheinblum won a long drive tournament in Provo, Utah with a drive of 333 yards (304 m).

== See also ==
- List of Jewish golfers
