= The Big Break =

- Starring: Tom Abbott; Melanie Collins; Blair O'Neal (2026); Matt Scharff (2026)
- Country of origin: United States

Production
- Running time: 60 minutes

Original release
- Network: Golf Channel
- Release: October 6, 2003 – present

The Big Break is an American golf reality competition series. Premiering on October 6, 2003, on Golf Channel, the series features aspiring professional golfers competing in various skills challenges for a chance to win a prize package, usually featuring a sponsor exemption for one or more tournaments and/or developmental tours.

The series originally ran on Golf Channel for 23 seasons from 2003 through 2015, after which the series was cancelled amid cuts by Golf Channel's then-owner NBCUniversal.

In October 2025, Golf Channel announced that The Big Break would be revived for a 24th season, in collaboration with the golf-oriented media company Good Good; the season was originally scheduled to premiere on August 25, 2026, but was withdrawn amid controversies involving Good Good and a resulting loss of sponsorship. Despite this, Golf Channel stated that it still planned to produce a new season of The Big Break in 2027.

== Format ==
Contestants on each season of The Big Break include professionals on semi-professional tours as well as amateurs who aspire to play golf professionally. The contestants compete in a series of golfing challenges, such as hitting balls into scoring zones or targets, shooting closest to the pin, and H-O-R-S-E-like competitions among others.

Each episode consists of three main challenges: the "Mulligan Challenge" is a competition that allows its winner to receive a mulligan that can be used in the second challenge—the "Skills Challenge". The winner of the skills challenge receives immunity during the elimination challenge, whose worst performer is eliminated from the competition. In the season finale, the final two contestants compete in a final match to determine the champion, who typically receives one or more sponsor exemptions for events on the PGA Tour, LPGA, and/or a developmental circuit (such as the LPGA's Futures Tour).

The show's signature challenge in the glass-breaking challenge, which usually takes place as the skills challenge in the season premiere; the golfers must make shots on a practice range to shatter glass targets with the names of the contestants on them. In the first season, the challenge was structured as a race, with the first contestant to shatter their target declared the winner. Beginning in the third season, the challenge was changed to a turn-based format, where contestants choose an opponent's target for each shot: if they hit and shatter the target, the respective contestant is eliminated, and the last golfer standing is declared the winner. In the fifth season, if the contestant hit a target successfully, they could keep playing until they missed a target.

== Editions of The Big Break ==
=== The Big Break I ===
The Big Break I premiered on October 6, 2003. The contest was filmed over ten days at the TreeTops Resort in Gaylord, Michigan. The winner would receive exemptions into four selected events on the Canadian Tour in 2004.

The ten hopefuls for the first season were:

Contestant	Hometown
Randy Block	San Antonio, Texas
Garrett Garland	Northridge, Los Angeles
Charles Calhoun	Marietta, Ohio
Justin Peters (Winner)	Plantation, Florida
Steve Duemig	Clearwater, Florida
Anthony Sorentino (Runner-up)	Rochester Hills, Michigan
Mark Farnham	Port Jefferson, New York
Craig Pawling	Sunrise, Florida
Jeff Brown	Hampton, Georgia
Jon Roddy	Orlando, Florida

The show was hosted by Phil Mickelson's swing coach, Rick Smith, and Katherine Roberts. In the end, Justin Peters defeated Anthony Sorentino 3 & 1 in the matchplay final. Peters, though, failed to make the cut in any of the four Canadian Professional Golf Tour events he played in.

=== The Big Break II: Las Vegas ===
The Big Break II first aired in September 2004. The contest was filmed in Las Vegas. The winner would receive four exemptions into Nationwide Tour events during the 2005 season.

The ten contestants were:

(In Order of Elimination)

Contestant	Hometown
Jay Mcnair	Florida
Shelby Chrest	Canada
Scotty Yancey	Illinois
Sean Daly	Visalia, California
Mike Foster	Georgia
David Gunas	Connecticut
John Turke	Clearwater, Florida
Bart Lower	Ionia, Michigan
Donny Donatello	Florida
Kip Henley (Winner)	Chattanooga, Tennessee

The Big Break II was the Golf Channel's highest rated show in its history of all programming. The show featured not only good golf but also some tension between roommates Sean Daly and Donny Donatello.

The winner Kip Henley failed to make any cuts on the Nationwide Tour, and shortly after his attempt to play his way on Tour, he went back to caddying on the PGA Tour for Brian Gay. Henley, who turned 50 in 2011, qualified for the FedEx St. Jude Classic through winning a Tennessee PGA Section event that included an automatic entry into the event, and has eligibility for the Champions Tour.

=== The Big Break III: Ladies Only ===
The Big Break III: Ladies Only premiered on February 8, 2005, featuring a field consisting exclusively of women's golfers. It took place at the Kingsmill Resort and Spa just outside Williamsburg, Virginia, with the winner receiving exemptions for three LPGA events (including the Michelob Ultra Open at Kingsmill and the American Century Championship) in 2005, along with a new Chrysler Crossfire and a $5,000 Golf Galaxy shopping spree.

The ten hopefuls for the third season were:

Contestant	Hometown
Tasha Browner	Tarzana, Los Angeles
Danielle Amiee (winner)	Newport Beach, California
Pamela Crikelair	Westchester County, New York
Valeria Ochoa	Miramar, Florida
Debbie Dahmer	Escondido, California
Jan Dowling	Dallas, Texas
Cindy Miller	Silver Creek, New York;
Sarah Sasse	Lincoln, Nebraska
Liz Uthoff	St. Louis, Missouri
Felicia Brown	Redondo Beach, California

Vince Cellini and Stephanie Sparks, who once briefly played on the LPGA Tour herself, became the show's new hosts. In the final, Crikelair and Amiee faced off, with Crikelair going 2 up after just three holes. Amiee came all the way back, and, at 1 up on the par 3 17th, sank a birdie to go 2 up, and clinch The Big Break III title 2 & 1.

Also for the first time, professional golfers from the tour handing out the exemptions made cameos. In the first episode of the season in which a contestant was eliminated (whom, by the way, would end up being Browner), LPGA winners Kelli Kuehne and Lorie Kane dropped by to participate in the season's first "Mulligan Challenge."

Amiee's first tournament, the Michelob Ultra Open, did not go well as far as trying to make the cut was concerned. She had plenty of fans following her. In her first round, Amiee shot 79 on the par-71 course. The second round was pushed back a day due to rain, where Amiee shot 77, missing the cut in her first LPGA event. Her second event, the Corning Classic, never materialized, as she withdrew before the first round, citing a back injury, throwing her second exemption away. However, it is believed that Amiee withdrew because of media pressure over an alleged topless photo of her that was circulating around the Internet. There has been a great deal of discussion over the validity of the photo.

Meanwhile, Miller, who actually played on the LPGA Tour from 1979 to 1981, when she married former PGA Tour player Allen Miller (the couple are still married, and have three children), competed in the LPGA Championship, having earned a spot by winning the 2004 LPGA Teaching & Club Professionals national championship. She shot an 84 in the first round, and an 88 in the second round, missing the cut.

It was then Dowling's turn to play in an LPGA event. She took part in the BMO Canadian Women's Open, where she shot a 77 in round one, and a 74 in round two to take a respectable 7-over for the tournament, though she still missed the cut. Dowling won the Canadian Women's Amateur Championship in 2000, helping her earn the Female Canadian Amateur Golfer of the Year Award; she was also individual champion of the Mid-American Conference in 1999 and 2000 while a student at Kent State University, and in her senior year at Kent State in 2002, she was given the Janet Bachna Award for Kent State Female Senior Athlete of the Year. While at Kent State, Dowling became friends with the winner of the 2003 The Open Championship, Ben Curtis. Dowling says her golfing hero is the great Canadian professional, Moe Norman, who died on September 4, 2004, over a month before the show began taping.

=== The Big Break All-Star Challenge ===
When The Big Break was first announced, a lot of celebrities applied for the show in addition to aspiring pros. The Golf Channel soon created a celebrity edition of the show, this one to benefit charities. On March 22, 2005, The Big Break All-Star Challenge debuted, featuring four members of the Boston Red Sox. Since then, there have been many more editions of the show, featuring NASCAR drivers, as well as members of the Green Bay Packers, the Chicago White Sox, the Tampa Bay Lightning, the cast of Scrubs, and the band Hootie & The Blowfish. There have been many various hosts of the All-Star edition, and not once have Cellini and Sparks co-hosted an episode together. Other Golf Channel personalities who have hosted the All-Star edition include Brian Hammons and Steve Sands, and some co-hosts have included former NASCAR star Benny Parsons (whose two sons have involvement in the sport; Kevin was a Gardner-Webb Runnin' Bulldogs golfer, and Keith is a high school golf coach in North Carolina) and two-time Champions Tour major winner Peter Jacobsen.

Jay Kossoff, the senior producer of The Big Break, told The Charlotte Observer at the taping of the first NASCAR edition, "We had a lot of celebrities apply for spots in the original shows, so we figured it was a neat idea to do something like this — let's take the next step."

=== The Big Break IV: USA vs. Europe ===
The Big Break IV was filmed in Scotland in June 2005 at the Carnoustie Golf Links and the Old Course at St Andrews, and premiered on September 13 of the same year; the season featured teams representing the United States and Europe, competing for exemptions into two European Tour events (the Algarve Open de Portugal and the Celtic Manor Wales Open), an endorsement deal with Bridgestone Golf, a two-year lease on a Ford Explorer, and a $5,000 gift card from Dick's Sporting Goods.

==== Team USA ====
Contestant	Hometown
Randall Hunt	Arlington, Texas
Tommy Gainey	Bishopville, South Carolina
T.J. Valentine	Plymouth, Massachusetts
David Carnell	Miami, Florida
Paul Holtby	Simi Valley, California
Bart Lower	Ionia, Michigan

==== Team Europe ====
Contestant	Hometown
Warren Bladon	Leamington Spa, England
Guy Woodman	Old Windsor, England
Edoardo Gardino	Crans-Montana, Switzerland
Marty Wilde Jr.	Tewin, England
Richard Gillot	Paris, France
Thomas Blankvoort	Wassenaar, Netherlands

Lower was the first contestant eliminated, surprising, considering the fact that he finished third on The Big Break II. Gillot, who won a Challenge Tour event in 2000, was the next to go, followed by Carnell, then Gardino. The USA-Europe elimination trade-off continued with Gainey getting the boot. It finally stopped with Hunt being eliminated in a two-part episode (the Immunity Challenge took a full hour, while Elimination took another). With just two members left, Team USA was given two episodes off so that the European team could be whittled down to its last two. In the first episode of this, ex-Amateur Championship winner Bladon was out, with Wilde to follow the next week. The final two were determined in a double-elimination episode, in which Woodman defeated Blankvoort and Holtby manhandled Valentine in separate 9-hole matchplay challenges. Holtby went on to defeat Woodman in the matchplay final, 1 Up. Unlike the previous editions, all the eliminated contestants stayed, followed the match and even took group photos with the winner.

In the Algarve Open, Holtby shot 1-over for two rounds, missing the cut by one shot.

Tommy Gainey finished high enough in the December 2007 PGA Tour 'Q-School' to become a member of the PGA Tour for 2008. He lost his tour card and returned to the Korn Ferry Tour, where he won two tournaments, earning a trip back to the main tour. In October 2012, he won the McGladrey Classic in Georgia for his first PGA Tour win. Gainey lost his tour card and was in Q-School with limited status when in January 2020, he won again on the Korn Ferry Tour. Gainey won the October 2025 Constellation Furyk and Friends on the PGA Tour Champions two months after turning 50, to become the 23rd player to win on the Korn Ferry Tour, PGA Tour, and PGA Tour Champions, and qualified for the Charles Schwab Cup Championship on the PGA Tour Champions in 2025.

Each team had one member with a claim to fame. European team player Wilde is the son of British singer Marty Wilde and the brother of Kim Wilde, who sang the 1981 hit, "Kids in America." Team USA member Valentine is the son of former professional bowler Jeffrey Valentine. Another European team member, Gardino, has caddied in two Ryder Cups (1999 and 2002), carrying bags for players like Sergio García, Miguel Ángel Jiménez, and José María Olazábal. Gardino also caddied for Ángel Cabrera in the 2005 Presidents Cup and the 2007 U.S. Open.

A new companion show, The Big Break IV: All Access, aired throughout the season; it was hosted by Cellini, with Ochoa as a correspondent.

=== The Big Break V: Hawaii ===
The Big Break V: Hawaii was filmed from October 16–30, 2005, at the Turtle Bay Resort in Oʻahu, site of the LPGA's SBS Open at Turtle Bay, and premiered on February 7, 2006. Similarly to season 3, the season once again featured an all-female cast, with the winner receiving an exemption to the 2006 Safeway Classic and remaining Futures Tour events, as well as a Bridgestone Golf endorsement, a Chrysler Crossfire, a $10,000 Golfsmith prize package, as well as golfing instruction from Dean Reinmuth, fitness training from former show host Roberts, and mental coaching from Gio Valiante.

11 golfers arrived in the Aloha State, but one was to be sent home before she could even unpack her bags. These 11 golfers were:

Contestant	Hometown
Jeanne Cho (Runner-up)	Orlando, Florida
Becky Lucidi	Poway, California
Dana Lacey	North Beach, Western Australia
Nikki DiSanto	Los Angeles, California
Katie Ruhe	Wesley Chapel, Florida
Ashley Prange (Winner)	Noblesville, Indiana
Kristina Tucker	Pageland, South Carolina
Divina Delasin	San Francisco
Kim Lewellen	Greenville, North Carolina
Jo D. Duncan	St. Louis, Missouri
Julie Wells	Wilsonville, Oregon

In the matchplay final, which aired on May 9, Prange defeated Cho 5 & 4 in the show's most lopsided matchplay final victory to date.

Since Big Break V, Prange has won twice on the Futures Tour (The Greater Tampa Futures Golf Classic and the Horseshoe Casino Futures Golf Classic) and has three other top ten finishes.

=== The Big Break VI: Trump National ===
The sixth edition The Big Break taped in late June and early July 2006 at the Trump National Golf Club in Los Angeles. The show premiered on September 26, 2006, with the finale taking place on December 19, 2006, and is a co-ed edition, with eight men and eight women competing for exemptions on the LPGA Tour and Champions Tours. On the ladies' side, Briana Vega defeated Bridget Dwyer by a score of 3 and 1, while Denny Hepler needed a 19th hole to finally clinch a win over Jeff Mitchell. Briana Vega became the ultimate winner by defeating Denny Hepler in a nine-hole skins match. After winning the last 4 out of the 9 holes, Bri was awarded $21,000 and a new car, while the women who partnered with her in holes 6 through 8 split $11,000. Denny won $9000 while the men who partnered with him in holes 1 thru 5 split $9,000.

=== The Big Break VII: Reunion at Reunion ===
The seventh season of The Big Break featured 16 returning female and male contestants from the first 6 seasons. It was filmed at Reunion Resort & Club in Kissimmee, Florida and premiered February 25, 2007. In the first part of the 3 person finale, Tommy Gainey played the first 9 holes at 2 under par. Ashley Gomez and Mike Foster each finished 1 over par, and Ashley then eliminated Mike in a sudden death hole. In the final nine holes of match play, Tommy defeated Ashley 3 & 2.

=== The Big Break Mesquite ===
For the first time on any edition of The Big Break, the eighth season offered an exemption into the Mayakoba Classic.

Premiering October 2, 2007, this season returned to the original format of 12 men competing for the title: Rick Schwartz and Stephanie Sparks were the hosts.

Future PGA Tour winner Matt Every was a contestant.

Contestant	Age	Hometown	Nickname	Episode Eliminated
Brian Kontak	37	Scottsdale, Arizona	"The Troublemaker"	Winner
Joshua Warthen	27	Arroyo Grande, California	"The Dude"	Runner-up, Episode 12
Hiroshi Matsuo	38	Jupiter, Florida	"The Veteran"	Episode 11
Gerry James	47	Ponte Vedra Beach, Florida	"The Giant"	Episode 10
Kevin Taylor	35	Mocksville, North Carolina	"The Black Sheep"	Episode 9
Benoit Beisser	25	Scottsdale, Arizona	"The Original"	Episode 8
James Nitties	25	Newcastle, New South Wales, Australia	"The Aussie"	Episode 7
Matt Vick	29	Franklin, Tennessee	"The All-American"	Episode 6
Mark Farrell	42	Westport, Connecticut	"The Suit"	Episode 5
Anthony Rodriguez	35	San Antonio, Texas	"The Star"	Episode 4, 2nd part of 2 part special
Matt Every	24	Gainesville, Florida	"The Natural"	Episode 2
Roger Fonnest Jr.	28	Mineola, New York	"The Underdog"	Episode 1

=== Big Break Ka'anapali ===
The ninth season premiered on April 15, 2008. It featured an all-female cast and was again filmed in Hawaii, this time at Ka'anapali Resort in Maui. New hosts were Stina Sternberg and Andrew Magee. The winner received an exemption into the 2008 Navistar LPGA Classic, entry fees to all 2009 Futures Tour tournaments waived, an Adams Golf endorsement deal, and a BMW Z4 Coupe. In the final, Kim Welch overcame an early 2 hole deficit to defeat Sophie Sandolo 4 & 3.

==== Contestants ====
Contestant	Age	Hometown	Status	Week Eliminated
Kim Welch	25	Sacramento, California	Futures Tour player	Winner
Sophie Sandolo	31	Nice, France	Ladies European Tour player	Runner-up
Lori Atsedes	44	Orlando, Florida	Futures Tour player	Week 11
Christina Lecuyer	27	Edmonton, Alberta, Canada	Cactus Tour player	Week 10
Susan Choi	23	Natick, Massachusetts	Newly turned professional	Week 9
Samantha Head	35	Orlando, Florida	Ladies European Tour player	Week 8
Courtney Erdman	25	Altadena, California	Futures Tour player	Week 7
Tina Miller	25	Miami, Florida	Former Futures Tour player	Week 6
Dana Bates	44	La Quinta, California	Teaching pro	Week 5
Adrienne Gautreaux	26	Dallas, Texas	Futures Tour player	Week 4
Elizabeth Stuart	26	Tampa, Florida	Futures Tour player	Week 4
Cirbie Sheppard	24	Auburn, California	Mini-tour player	Week 3

=== Big Break X: Michigan ===
The 10th season premiered on October 7, 2008. Eight two-person teams composed of a male and female competed at Boyne Highlands Resort. Stina Sternberg and Billy Ray Brown were the hosts. In this season the finale was broken into 3 parts: 6 holes of best ball, 6 holes of alternate shot, and 6 holes of aggregate score. Haymes and Bernadette defeated Hugo and Camila 2 & 1.

==== Contestants ====
Male Contestant	Hometown	Female Contestant	Hometown	Team Relationship	Week Eliminated
Haymes Snedeker^{1}	Fairhope, Alabama	Bernadette "Bernie" Luse	Naples, Florida	Friends	Winners
Hugo León	Jupiter, Florida	Camila Mori	Miami, Florida	Couple	Runners-up
Robby Shaw	Louisville, Kentucky	Amber Prange^{2}	Noblesville, Indiana	Dating	Week 10
David Mobley	Huntersville, North Carolina	Sally Dee	Tampa, Florida	Long drive champions	Week 8
Casey Lubahn	Lansing, Michigan	Rachel Lubahn	Lansing, Michigan	Newlyweds	Week 7
Michael Michaelides	East Elmhurst, New York	Sherri McDonald	Lambertville, New Jersey	Coaches	Week 6
Otis Smith	Stone Mountain, Georgia	Rachel Melendez	Atlanta, Georgia	Co-workers	Week 4
James Vargas	Miami, Florida	Andrea VanderLende	Longwood, Florida	Exes	Week 3

^1 Haymes Snedeker is the brother of PGA Tour player Brandt Snedeker.

^2 Amber is the sister of The Big Break V: Hawaii winner Ashley Prange.

=== Big Break Prince Edward Island ===
The 11th season aired in Summer 2009. Six women and six men competed for a grand prize of $100,000 in cash. Contestants included a former Marine Captain who had served in Afghanistan in 2003, and a model. The hosts were Charlie Rymer and Stina Sternberg.

Contestant	Residence	Position
Kim Kouwabunpat	Upland, Calif.	
William Thompson	Bracey, Va.	
Nicole Sikora	Yonkers, N.Y.	
Robert Read	Seekonk, Mass.	
Eugene Smith	Glen Ridge, N.J.	
Gerina Mendoza	Roswell, N.M.	3rd Runner up
Derek Gillespie	Oshawa, Ontario	Winner
Caroline Larsson	Orlando, Fla.	
Brian Skatell	Virginia Beach, Va.	
Brenda McLarnon	Charleston, S.C.	2nd Runner up
Aaron Wright	Orlando, Fla.	
Blair O'Neal	Tempe, Ariz.	1st Runner up

Derek Gillespie was the only male to reach the final four and then survived a 2-hole elimination match with Gerina Mendoza, by 1 stroke. In the first half of the finale, Gillespie played 9 holes at −1 while Blair O'Neal was +1 and Brenda McLarnon was eliminated at +3. In the last 9 holes, the match-up was O'Neal vs. Gillespie, with Gillespe winning by a three-stroke margin (−1 to +2).

=== Big Break Disney Golf ===
This twelfth season, Big Break Disney Golf premiered on October 13, 2009. Challenges took place at courses and off-course locations in and around Walt Disney World in Orlando, Florida. Vince Cellini and Stephanie Sparks returned as hosts.

Contestants:

- Mike Perez (Scottsdale, Arizona) – Nationwide Tour member and brother of PGA Tour player Pat Perez. Winner, Defeated Tony Finau in extra holes after Tony hit it in the water on the 17th hole to tie the score and won on the 19th hole to win Big Break Disney Golf.
- Tony Finau (Lehi, Utah) – Brother of contestant Gipper Finau. Turned professional at age 17 and made a cut on the PGA Tour the same year. Finau eventually won on the 2016 PGA Tour and made the Tour Championship in 2019.
- Kevin Erdman (Arcadia, California) – Husband of Big Break Ka'anapali contestant Courtney Erdman.
- Gipper Finau (Lehi, Utah) – Brother of contestant Tony Finau. Turned professional at age 16: eliminated week 9
- Andrew Giuliani (New York, New York) – Son of former mayor of New York City Rudy Giuliani: eliminated week 8
- Blake Moore (Monrovia, California) – Friend of former Big Break competitor and PGA Tour player James Nitties: eliminated week 7
- Vincent Johnson (Portland, Oregon) – Received the Charlie Sifford exemption to play in the 2009 Northern Trust Open: eliminated week 6
- J.R. Reyes (Omaha, Nebraska) – Former NJCAA All-American. Waits tables at a diner to support his dream of playing golf professionally: eliminated week 5
- Sean Kalin (Delray Beach, Florida) – Former junior star golfer who gave up the game for 20 years after being kidnapped: eliminated week 4
- Kevan Maxwell (Charleston, South Carolina) – Pizza delivery man: eliminated week 3
- Andreas Huber (Scottsdale, Arizona) – A former Wall Street broker and the son of actress Susan Lucci: eliminated week 2
- Ed Moses (Hollywood, California) – A gold and silver medal winner as a member of the United States swim team at the 2000 Olympic Games: eliminated week 1

=== Big Break Sandals Resort ===
In the exciting finale, Carling Coffing made a 25-foot birdie putt on the 17th hole to take the lead over Lili Alvarez. Coffing won the match 1 up.

==== Contestants ====
Contestant	Age	Hometown
Sara Brown	24	Tucson, Arizona
Elena Robles	26	Torrance, California
Lili Alvarez	26	Durango, Mexico
Chris Brady	25	Charlotte, North Carolina
Maiya Tanaka	24	San Diego, California
Ryann O'Toole	23	San Clemente, California
Kelly Sheehan	32	Milwaukee, Wisconsin
Seema Sadekar	24	Las Vegas, Nevada
Taryn Durham	24	Glasgow, Kentucky
Stacey Bieber	25	Winnipeg, Manitoba, Canada
Carling Coffing	24	Middletown, Ohio

==== Elimination chart ====
Contestant	Ep. 1	Ep. 2	Ep. 3	Ep. 4	Ep. 5	Ep. 6	Ep. 7	Ep. 8	Ep. 9	Ep. 10
Carling		Win				Win	Win	Low	Low	Champion
Lili		Low	Win		Win	Low		Win	Win	Runner-up
Sara						Win	Low	Low	Out	
Taryn				Save	Low	Low	Save	Out		
Seema		Low	Save	Save^{1}		Win	Out			
Chris		Low	Win	Low	Save	Out				
Ryann	Save		Low		Out					
Stacey			Win	Out						
Maiya	Low	Save	Out							
Kelly	Save	Out								
Elena	Out									

^1 Won immunity before play began

=== Big Break Dominican Republic ===
This season, which debuted on September 28, 2010, saw some significant format changes. For one thing, it became a pure team competition. The object of this season was to be the first team to remove all members of the other team in a double elimination format. A contestant losing the individual challenge at the end of the show was "benched" for the next program. A second loss by a "benched" contestant constitutes elimination. Individual prizes - cash, shopping sprees and tour exemptions - are awarded by way of a points system. The contestant on the winning team with the most points will be declared the "most valuable player" and will receive the prizes.

The teams, both composed of past Big Break contestants, are divided into men (blue shirts) and women (red shirts). If a male player is MVP, he will win an exemption to the PGA Tour Justin Timberlake Shriners Hospitals for Children Open in Las Vegas. If the MVP is female, she will win an exemption to the LPGA Tour Kia Classic in Industry, California. Blair O'Neal was the winner.

The show is taped at the Teeth of the Dog course at the Casa de Campo Resort. The course was designed by Pete Dye.

Tensions ran high this season because of the "battle of the sexes" format. There was far more cheering, fist-pumping, and cursing from the players than in a typical season. Also the eliminated players remained on the benches throughout the season to root on their teammates. After the girls team benched 4 guys in a row, Elena said in confessional, “I think the guys team is more concerned with the fact that America is going to laugh at them for getting their ass kicked by a bunch of hot girls”.

Prior to the finale, David, Brenda, Elena, and Sara received 2 strikes and were eliminated from the competition. This left 5 men and 3 women. Sara was then selected to return to the competition after the women holed out a shot from off the green. Because Blair never got any strikes, she received 10 MVP points and jumped to the top of the standings.

In the finale, Andrew, Anthony, Blake, Brian, and William competed for the men. Blair, Christina, Sara, and Lori competed for the women.

The men won the team challenge and got to select the match-ups and holes for the elimination matches.

In round 1, Blair defeated William, Blake defeated Lori, Sara defeated Brian, and Christina defeated Andrew.

In round 2. Blair defeated Anthony and Christina defeated Blake.

Sara, Christina, and Blair survived and the women won 3 players to 0. All 3 women made a birdie in an elimination hole. Blair added 10 MVP points for her 2 wins and finished with 57 MVP points in first place (12 points ahead of second).

The winner of the Big Break Dominican Republic was Blair O'Neal and she won $50,000 and other prizes including an LPGA exemption while the rest of her team split another $50,000. Anthony was the male MVP and won the PGA exemption.

Contestant	Hometown
Andrew Giuliani	New York, New York
David Mobley	Huntersville, North Carolina
Blake Moore	Monrovia, California
Anthony Rodriguez	San Antonio, Texas
Brian Skatell	Virginia Beach, Virginia
William Thompson	Bracey, Virginia
Lori Atsedes	Orlando, Florida
Sara Brown	Tucson, Arizona
Christina Lecuyer	Edmonton, Alberta, Canada
Brenda McLarnon	Charleston, South Carolina
Blair O’Neal	Tempe, Arizona
Elena Robles	Torrance, California

=== Big Break Indian Wells ===
A portion of the following season of The Big Break was shown on the Golf Channel on December 2, 2010. Raymond Floyd's son Robert was one of the contestants.

The championship match of came down to two Canadians, David Byrne vs. Kent Eger. Byrne birdied the final hole of regulation to tie the match. On the playoff hole, Byrne needed to make a four-foot par putt to win the hole and the match, and he did.

==== Contestants ====
Contestant	Age	Hometown
Will Lowery	26	Charlotte, North Carolina
Kent Eger	30	Regina, Saskatchewan, Canada
Carl Whyte	32	Salisbury, Maryland
Piri "Petey" Borja	25	Coral Springs, Florida
John Lepak	30	La Habra Heights, California
Oren Geri	37	Tel Aviv, Israel
David Byrne	23	Essex, Ontario, Canada
Robbie "Shank" Biershenk	34	Greenville, South Carolina
Russell Normandin	36	Woonsocket, Rhode Island
Justin Payne	30	Floydada, Texas
Robert Floyd	35	Palm Beach Gardens, Florida

=== Big Break Ireland ===
Big Break Ireland was contested in the K Club in Straffan, County Kildare, Ireland. It premiered on September 20, 2011. This was the first season where the men eliminated all the women prior to the finale. Mallory was the top female and finished in 3rd place. Mark Murphy won the season finale against Julien Trudeau.

==== Contestants ====
===== Team Liffey =====
Contestant	Age	Hometown
Mallory Blackwelder	24	Versailles, Kentucky
Annie Brophy	24	Spokane, Washington
Kelly Jacques	25	Thornton, Colorado
Matt Melrose	27	Mulanje, Malawi
Mark Murphy	34	Waterville, Ireland (Winner)
Andy Walker	36	Phoenix, Arizona

===== Team Straffan =====
Contestant	Age	Hometown
Joe Campbell	23	Cheltenham, England
Bennett Maki	26	Atlanta, Georgia
Nina Rodriguez	27	San Jose, California
Nicole Smith	24	Riverside, California
Whitney Wright	26	Greenville, South Carolina
Julien Trudeau	30	Montréal, Canada

=== Big Break Atlantis ===
Big Break Atlantis was contested at the Ocean Club Golf Course on Paradise Island, The Bahamas. It premiered on May 14, 2012.

==== Contestants ====
Contestant	Age	Hometown
Allison Micheletti	24	St. Louis, Missouri
Anya Alvarez	22	Tulsa, Oklahoma
Aubrey McCormick	29	Orlando, Florida
Christina Stockton	24	Rocklin, California
Gloriana Soto	25	San Jose, Costa Rica
Kelly Villarreal	29	Birmingham, Alabama
Marcela Leon (winner)	31	Monterrey, Mexico
Meghan Hardin	19	Lake Arrowhead, California
Natalia Ghilzon	21	Windsor, Ontario
Selanee Henderson (runner-up)	25	Apple Valley, California
Shannon Fish	23	Spring, Texas
Zakiya Randall	20	Washington, D.C.

=== Big Break Greenbrier ===
The 18th season of Big Break featured 12 men and premiered October 2, 2012. Mark Silvers defeated James Lepp in the finale. With the win Silvers received a sponsor's exemption to the 2013 Greenbrier Classic. He missed the cut posting a +2 36-hole score.

=== Big Break Mexico ===
The 19th season featured 6 men and 6 women. The contestants were divided into 3 teams of 4. Halfway through the season all 4 members of Team Maya remained while the other teams were down to 1 player each. The players remaining on the other teams, Brent and Matthew each eliminated several players. Taylor Collins who hadn't been in an elimination match prior to the semifinals, defeated Brent in the semifinal and Matthew by 2 holes in the final to become Big Break Champion.

Taylor became the first female on Big Break to defeat a male in an 18-hole final. As the winner, Taylor earned entry into the LPGA's Lorena Ochoa Invitational. Had the winner been male, he would have earned entry into the OHL Classic at Mayakoba.

=== Big Break NFL Puerto Rico ===
The 20th season, Big Break NFL Puerto Rico, premiered on October 8, 2013; this season featured an all-star format, with three-person teams consisting of a National Football League player, and male and female alumni from a previous season of The Big Break. The participating NFL players included Tim Brown, Marc Bulger, Chris Doleman, Al Del Greco, Jerry Rice, and Mark Rypien. The winning team received $50,000 each, with the NFL player donating their winnings to a charity of their choice. The season also featured Sunday Night Football sideline reporter Michele Tafoya as co-host, and appearances by Football Night in America analyst Rodney Harrison.

The team of Jerry Rice, Emily Talley, and Isaac Sanchez won.

Because of legal issues following the NBC/Versant split, participation of former NFL players, usage of team trademarks, and Tafoya being a candidate in the 2026 United States Senate election in Minnesota, this series is not eligible to be rebroadcast over legal issues over NFL participation, licencing, and FCC regulations of the broadcast.

=== Big Break Florida ===
Big Break Florida premiered on 24 February 2014. The season was hosted at Omni Amelia Island Plantation in Amelia Island, Florida. Melanie Collins replaced Stephanie Sparks as female host. The winner received over $175,000 in cash and prizes, entry into the 2014 Manulife Financial LPGA Classic, and a full-season exemption on the second-tier Symetra Tour with all entry fees paid. The winner was Jackie Stoelting.

=== Big Break Myrtle Beach ===
The Myrtle Beach installment premiered on October 7, 2014. Paige Mackenzie was the new female host. The winner would receive a $100,000 prize package, and a full-season exemption to either the NGA Pro Golf Tour (men's) or Futures Tour (women's), and invitations to either the 2015 Valspar Championship (men) or Portland Classic (women).

This season introduced Super Immunity, in which a player could skip any elimination challenge after failing to win regular Immunity in the season. Charlie beat Tessa in the final round to win Super Immunity but chose not to use it in 3 opportunities in order to try to win a $10,000 prize. The first time he wasn't selected for the elimination match. The second time Tessa challenged him and was eliminated in 6th place. The last time Jimmy challenged and eliminated him in 5th place.

Anthony, Emily, Jimmy and Toph advanced to the semifinals. Jimmy defeated Toph in the finale to earn the Valspar exemption, where he missed the cut.

==== Contestants ====
Contestant	Age	Hometown	Note
Anthony Quezada	19	Phoenix, Arizona	Type 1 diabetic, competes on Southwest-based tours
Carolin Pinegger	23	Schladming, Austria	Turned professional in 2013, played on Symetra Tour in 2014
Charlie Harrison	23	Las Vegas, Nevada	PGA Tour Latinoamerica member in 2014
Christian Heavens	25	East Saint Louis, Illinois	Plays on Southeast-based mini tours
Dave Markle	29	Shelburne, Ontario, Canada	Type 1 diabetic, plays on PGA Tour Canada
Emily Tubert	22	Burbank, California	Turned professional May 2014
Jimmy Brandt	31	Waverly, Alabama	Had conditional Web.com Tour status in 2011 and 2012
Katie Detlefsen	25	Eagan, Minnesota	LPGA Class A Teaching Professional
Katy Harris	35	South Bend, Indiana	Did not compete for 9 years due to hand injury, conditional status on LPGA Tour in 2014
Krista Puisite	23	Riga, Latvia	Symetra Tour member in 2014
Tessa Teachman	24	Rochester, New York	Ladies European Tour member in 2014
Toph Peterson	28	Logan, Utah	Owns designer walking bag company, plays on Southeast-based tours

=== Big Break The Palm Beaches ===
The 23rd installment premiered February 2, 2015. The winner received over $180,000 in cash and prizes, including a sponsor exemption to the Barbasol Championship. The winner of the competition was Richy Werenski. In May 2015, NBCUniversal released most of the production staff of Original Productions, the division of the Golf Channel that created and produced the show since its beginning in 2003. That same group created and produced "Altered Course", another golf-based competition show premiering in June 2015.

Also featured in this season was the trick shot duo, The Bryan Brothers, including George and Wesley Bryan. Wesley Bryan played on mini-tours before earning his Web.com Tour card for 2016 by finishing T-9 at qualifying school. In his third event of the 2016 season, he won the Chitimacha Louisiana Open. He picked up a second win a month later at the El Bosque Mexico Championship. In August, he won his third event of the season, the Digital Ally Open, to earn promotion to the PGA Tour. He was the eleventh golfer to do so. He won the 2016 Web.com Tour Player of the Year award, and in 2017 won the RBC Heritage for his only FedEx Cup tournament win.

=== Big Break × Good Good ===
In October 2025, Golf Channel announced that it would revive The Big Break; the new season would be co-produced with the golf-oriented digital media company and YouTube channel Good Good. Two regulars of its YouTube channel—Brad Dalke and Sean Walsh—were part of its cast, while Blair O'Neal and Good Good personality Matt Scharff co-hosted. The season was filmed at the Horseshoe Bay Resort in Horseshoe Bay, Texas, and the winner was to receive a sponsor exemption to the Good Good Championship—a new PGA Tour fall event in Barton Creek, Texas that would debut in the 2026 season.

The cast was announced on July 15, 2026. Big Break × Good Good was originally scheduled to premiere on August 25, 2026. Two hours before it was scheduled to air, Golf Channel preempted the season premiere to September 1, in order to remove references to a sponsor—reported to have been Golf Galaxy—that had withdrawn over a controversial Good Good/Callaway commercial criticized as promoting violence against women. On August 27, Good Good announced that it would withdraw its title sponsorship of the Barton Creek tournament; later that day, Golf Channel announced that Big Break × Good Good had been withdrawn from its schedule and will not air. Despite the cancellation, Golf Channel stated that it planned to produce a new season of The Big Break in 2027.

==== Contestants ====
Contestant	Hometown	Note
Matthew Meneghetti	Schererville, Indiana	Carthage College
Sean Walsh	Keller, Texas	Gonzaga
Asaeli Batibasaga	Fiji	Based in Mount Vernon, OH. Former caddie for PGA Tour pro Jason Day.
Ryder Epson	Long Beach, California	Long Beach State
Josh Jackson	Mason, Ohio	Kentucky State. World Long Drive player. Son of John Jackson, a former NFL Offensive Tackle.
Peter Lansburgh	Sacramento, California	
Jean-Phillippe Mehu	Haiti	Florida International University
Velten Meyer	Oldenburg, Germany	Louisiana-Monroe. 2022 Vierumäki Finnish Challenge winner on the Challenge Tour.
Kipp Popert	Kent, England	Four-time U.S. Adaptive Open winner (cerebral palsy). Qualified for The Amateur Championship.
Jesse Rouse	Durant, Oklahoma	Southeastern Oklahoma State University
Mike Sweeney	Enfield, Connecticut	
Fletcher Babcock	Danielson, Connecticut	Winner of last-chance shootout to qualify

=== Special editions ===
In addition to the regular Big Break shows with the standard format there were two special edition shows. The first was Big Break Academy, an instructional program featuring the most recently eliminated contestant from Big Break. It premiered May 15, 2012 hosted by Michael Breed.

The second was the Big Break Invitational, a golf tournament held at Reynolds Lake Oconee, in collaboration with The Golf Channel, on September 30, 2014 - October 3, 2014 in Eatonton, GA. The event was held on the Jack Nicklaus designed Great Waters course along the shores of Lake Oconee. Forty contestants from previous Big Break events were invited to play in the championship with a $300,000 total purse. The event was a knockout format with 12 players winning their way into the final day. Jay Woodson, Big Break Mexico, took home the winner's trophy and $100,000. Finishing second was Emily Talley while Tommy "Two Gloves" Gainey finished in a tie for third with current PGA superstar Tony Finau. The Big Break Invitational was supposed to be an annual event, but in 2015 NBC, parent company of The Golf Channel, decided they wanted to go in a different direction with the show.
