= Big Break Atlantis =

Season of television series

Big Break Atlantis was the 17th edition of the Golf Channel's reality show, The Big Break. It was contested at the Paradise Island Golf Course on Paradise Island, The Bahamas. It premiered on May 14, 2012 and included an all-female cast.

== Contestants ==
Contestant	Age	Hometown
Allison Micheletti	24	St. Louis, Missouri
Anya Alvarez	22	Tulsa, Oklahoma
Aubrey McCormick	29	Orlando, Florida
Christina Stockton	24	Rocklin, California
Gloriana Soto	25	San Jose, Costa Rica
Kelly Villarreal	29	Birmingham, Alabama
Marcela Leon	31	Monterrey, Mexico
Meghan Hardin	19	Lake Arrowhead, California
Natalia Ghilzon	21	Windsor, Ontario
Selanee Henderson	25	Apple Valley, California
Shannon Fish	23	Spring, Texas
Zakiya Randall	20	Washington, D.C.

== Elimination Chart ==
Contestant	Ep. 1	Ep. 2	Ep. 3	Ep. 4	Ep. 5	Ep. 6	Ep. 7	Ep. 8	Ep. 9	Ep. 10	Ep. 11
Marcela											
Selanee											
Gloriana											
Christina											
Anya											
Kelly											
Allison											
Natalia											
Aubrey											
Zakiya											
Shannon											
Meghan											

Contestant WON the Big Break
Contestant won the first stage of the immunity challenge
Contestant won the final stage of the immunity challenge
Contestant won immunity before show began
Contestant sacrificed their points to avoid Elimination Challenge
Contestant won the first stage Elimination Challenge
Contestant won the final stage of the Elimination Challenge
Contestant was Eliminated

== Summary ==
The contestants compete in certain various challenges to gain points. The player who gets to 100 points first goes straight into the championship match.

=== Show 1: Maiden Voyage ===
Upon arrival to the location, the players did a putting challenge where there are three distances players can choose to try to sink a putt. Five points are awarded for the 10 footer, 3 points are awarded for the 7 footer, and 1 point is awarded for the 4 footer.

The next challenge is the glass-breaking challenge where at two players at a time, players face one-on-one and the player who breaks their opponent's glass in the fewest attempts wins 10 points and wins immunity to the next show while the losing player heads to the next stage of the immunity challenge. If they both break the glass in the same number of tries, they both get four points but move to the next stage.

The next stage of the immunity challenge is where players try to get as close to the hole as possible with an iron shot and they can get anywhere between one and four points. They take two attempts and can choose whether or not to do the third attempt. A third attempt missing the green results in losing all the points earned in this challenge.

The two players with the lowest points head to the elimination challenge where they play the 16th hole. Meghan was the first player to get eliminated when Selanee made a birdie.

==== Leaderboard ====
Player	Total Points	Putting	Glass Break	Target Shot
Kelly	**15**	5	10	M
Zakiya	**15**	5	10	M
Anya	**11**	3	4	4
Christina	**10**	0	10	M
Marcela	**10**	0	10	M
Natalia	**10**	0	10	M
Allison	**9**	5	0	4
Shannon	**7**	0	0	7
Gloriana	**6**	0	4	2
Aubrey	**4**	0	0	4
Selanee	**0**	0	0	0
Meghan	**0** (OUT)	0	0	0

- M = Already won immunity, exempt into last challenge

=== Show 2: Abandon Ship ===
The remaining players were divided in teams of four with points leaders Kelly and Zakiya choosing their teammates. Kelly chose Natalia, Marcela, and Gloriana, while Zakiya chose Shannon, Anya, and Allison. The remaining players Christina, Aubrey, and Selanee, were teamed with Yani Tseng who made a guest appearance.

The first challenge required players to play the 11th hole by hitting the fairway then hitting the green from the fairway. If the player misses, she would keep hitting the shot until successful. Each shot the player plays adds a point to their team scores, and the team with the lowest score wins immunity.

Christina's team went first, where they made 11 points when Aubrey missed the green multiple times. Afterwards, Kelly's team topped them with 8 points after all four players hit the fairway and the green on their first attempt, though Gloriana's drive found the trees and then bounced back into the fairway. Zakiya's team went last, and it was over when Anya missed the fairway. With no mathematical chance to catch up to Kelly's team, they won immunity and each of them earned 10 championship points.

The remaining teams (Zakiya's and Christina's) head to the second challenge which is the wall flop challenge where the players get the ball in the hole from behind a wall in the fewest strokes possible. Each team is allowed two mulligans where if they botch a shot, they could get Yani Tseng to re-hit the shot (or putt) for them and that shot would count for them. Each stroke counts as a point, and the team with the lowest points wins immunity.

Christina's team won with 10 points, beating Zakiya's team who had 11 points, largely due to Anya needing to take 4 strokes to get in the hole. Christina's team earned 6 championship points for each team member.

Zakiya, Shannon, Anya, and Allison were headed to the elimination challenge, though Zakiya was given the option to sacrifice all her championship points to buy immunity, which she did choose to do.

The remaining three players played a closest-to-the-hole competition with the player landing the closest being safe. Anya hit the closest, resulting in the other two players heading into elimination.

Shannon and Allison headed into a 2-hole playoff where they play the 9th and 18th holes and the player with the lowest score total is safe. Allison bogeys the first hole with a three-putt while Shannon bogeys the second hole after hitting her drive in the bunker. So they head to sudden death by replaying the 18th hole. Allison won with a par when Shannon hit her drive into the water and made bogey.

==== Leaderboard ====
Player	Total Points	This Show
Kelly	**25**	10
Marcela	**20**	10
Natalia	**20**	10
Gloriana	**16**	10
Christina	**16**	6
Anya	**11**	0
Aubrey	**10**	6
Allison	**9**	0
Selanee	**6**	6
Zakiya	**0**	-15
Shannon	**7** (OUT)	0

=== Show 3: Castles Made of Sand ===
The players each have five shots and they can choose how many shots to play from three locations: Long Drive, Fairway, and Greenside Bunker. The fairway and bunker shots are closest-to-the-hole competitions. The winner of each challenge wins immunity and 10 championship points, plus 1 extra point for any shots remaining.

- Long Drive:

Player	Longest Drive	Shots Used	Shots Left
Anya	231	2	3
Christina	MISS	1	4
Natalia	MISS	1	4
Selanee	230	3	2
Allison	MISS	2	3
Kelly	201	1	4
**Marcela**	**235**	**1**	**4**
Zakiya	PASS	0	5
Aubrey	PASS	0	5
Gloriana	PASS	0	5

- Fairway Shot:

Player	Closest Shot	Shots Used	Shots Left
Zakiya	21' 1	3	2
Selanee	21	1	1
Aubrey	18' 9	2	3
Allison	20' 7	2	0
**Kelly**	**3**	**3**	**1**
Gloriana	21' 11	3	2
Natalia	15' 8	2	2
Anya	PASS	0	3
Christina	PASS	0	4

- Bunker Shot:

Player	Closest Shot	Shots Used	Shots Left
Zakiya	3' 3	2	0
Anya	6' 8	3	0
Gloriana	9' 10	2	0
Christina	4' 3	4	0
Selanee	8' 11	1	0
**Aubrey**	**3' 1**	**3**	**0**
Natalia	13' 1	2	0
Allison	PASS	0	0

The remaining players head to the next stage of the challenge where they play three closest-to-the-hole challenges from four locations with one attempt. The winner wins immunity and 6 points while the player farthest to the hole gets into the elimination challenge. The first location is a long putt, the second is a pitch shot, and the third is a fairway shot.

Player	Location 1	Location 2	Location 3
**Gloriana**	**1' 3**	WIN	WIN
**Anya**	3' 3	**18' 6**	WIN
**Allison**	7	41	**7' 10**
Selanee	5' 3	22	16' 5
Zakiya	13' 5	38' 6	17' 8
Christina	10	78	LOSE
Natalia	13' 7	LOSE	LOSE

Selanee gets to choose one player to compete with in for the fourth location in which the player closest to the hole is safe from elimination. Selanee picks Christina and would go on to win. So Christina, Natalia, and Zakiya are headed to elimination. Natalia, having the most points out of the players, has the option to sacrifice all her points to buy out of elimination, which she chooses to do so. Christina and Zakiya are headed to elimination, where they get the ball in the hole from three locations, and the player with the lowest score is safe for the next show while the higher score gets eliminated. The first location is a greenside bunker, the second is from the fairway, and the third is a pitch shot from the rough.

Player	Location 1	Location 2	Location 3	Total
Zakiya	3	3	3	**9**
Christina	2	3	4	**9**

With the scores tied, the two players replay the third location, which Christina would win after taking 2 shots to get in the hole.

==== Leaderboard ====
Player	Total Points	This Show
Kelly	**36**	11
Marcela	**34**	14
Gloriana	**22**	6
Aubrey	**20**	10
Anya	**17**	6
Christina	**16**	0
Allison	**15**	6
Selanee	**12**	6
Natalia	**0**	-20
Zakiya	**0** (OUT)	0

=== Show 4: Time and Tide Wait For No One ===
The remaining nine contestants are divided into three teams with the points leaders Kelly, Marcela, and Gloriana as captains. Kelly chooses Natalia and Selanee, Marcela chooses Allison and Christina, and Gloriana chooses Aubrey and Anya.

The first challenge is a speed golf challenge. The players must play a hole and the score of the hole depends on a combination between the speed and the time taken, in which each stroke counts as a point and every 10 seconds taken counts as a point. The team with the lowest score wins immunity and win 10 championship points.

Driver	Approach	Putter	Strokes	Time (x10) Seconds	Final Score
Natalia	Kelly	Selanee	5	11.1	16.1
Gloriana	Aubrey	Anya	6	13	19.5
**Marcela**	**Allison**	**Christina**	**3**	**9.5**	**12.5**

The remaining players head into the next challenge in which they compete against their teammates in a game of Wolf, where the player winning the most points winning immunity and 6 championship points. If the scores are tied, a playoff is done.

Player	Location 1	Location 2	Location 3	Total Points	Playoff
**Gloriana**	**4**	**4**	**0**	**8**	**WIN**
Aubrey	1	1	0	2	OUT
Anya	1	1	6	8	LOSE

Player	Location 1	Location 2	Location 3	Total Points	Playoff
Kelly	1	1	0	2	OUT
**Natalia**	**1**	**4**	**3**	**8**	**WIN**
Selanee	4	1	3	8	LOSE

The remaining four players head into the elimination challenge. Kelly, the points leader, is given the option to sacrifice all her points to buy immunity, which she chooses to do so.

The three players head to a driving challenge in which the player hitting the best drive wins immunity. The drive is measured by the length of the drive subtracted by the distance from the middle of the fairway. The players are given 2 attempts.

Player	Distance	Accuracy	Score
Selanee	268	15	253
Aubrey	253	12	241
**Anya**	**262**	**5**	**257**

The remaining players Aubrey and Selanee play the 2nd hole of the course, where the player with the higher score gets eliminated. Aubrey gets eliminated when Selanee made a birdie.

==== Leaderboard ====
Player	Total Points	This Show
Marcela	**44**	10
Gloriana	**28**	6
Christina	**26**	10
Allison	**25**	10
Anya	**17**	0
Selanee	**12**	0
Natalia	**6**	6
Kelly	**0**	-36
Aubrey	**20** (OUT)	0

=== Show 5: Batten Down the Hatches ===
The two players with the lowest point total, Natalia and Kelly, play one hole for sudden death where the losing player heads straight to the elimination challenge while the other gets to participate in the immunity challenge. Natalia won with a par and Kelly goes directly to elimination.

The immunity challenge involves a guest appearance from Gerina Piller, a former Big Break: Prince Edward Island participant. The first challenge is a tic-tac-tow challenge where players must hit their balls into nets to put their piece on the board and the winner getting 2 challenge points. The matchups are decided based on points standings, with Natalia, the lowest points earner, facing Gerina.

Match	Winner	Loser
1	**Gerina**	Natalia
2	**Allison**	Christina
3	**Gloriana**	Anya
4	**Marcela**	Selanee

The second stage is a target golf challenge where the players try to hit as close as possible to the hole in three locations. The circles are marked as targets on the green and the player getting within a specific target gets a particular number of points from 1 to 3. The locations are chosen by Gerina, and she also hits the shots herself, and the points she get for her shots gets added to the players' point totals with the exception of Kelly.

Player	Tic-Tac-Toe	Location 1	Location 2	Location 3	Total
Gerina	-	1	3	2	6
Marcela	2	3	1	1	7 (+6)
Christina	2	1	3	0	6 (+6)
Selanee	0	3	2	1	6 (+6)
Anya	0	0	3	0	3 (+6)
**Allison**	**0**	**2**	**3**	**3**	**8 (+6)**
Gloriana	2	0	0	3	5 (+6)
Natalia	0	3	0	0	3 (+6)
Kelly	NE	NE	NE	NE	0

Allison wins the challenge and wins $5,000 for Avis Rent a Car System. Anya and Natalia, having the lowest point total from the challenge, are headed to the elimination challenge along with Kelly. Anya, having the most points out of the three, is given the option to buy out of the challenge which she chooses to do so.

Natalia and Kelly play from three locations on the 16th hole with each player choosing one location, and the player taking the fewest strokes out of those three locations wins the elimination challenge and the loser gets eliminated. Natalia beats Kelly on the first hole and carries over the lead to the third challenge, in which they play the full hole from the tee. Natalia hits her drive in the water and ends up with a triple bogey, resulting in Kelly winning the challenge.

Player	Location 1	Location 2	Location 3	Total
**Kelly**	**5**	**3**	**6**	**14 (IN)**
Natalia	4	3	8	15 (OUT)

==== Leaderboard ====
Player	Total Points	This Show
Marcela	**57**	13
Allison	**39**	14
Christina	**38**	12
Gloriana	**39**	11
Selanee	**24**	12
Anya	**0**	-17
Kelly	**0**	0
Natalia	**15** (OUT)	9

=== Show 6: Between the Devil and the Deep Blue Sea ===
In this show, the buy-out option is gone so all the players are eligible for elimination. The first stage of the immunity challenge is where players try to hit as close to the hole as possible in three locations, with the player having the least cumulative distance after the three locations, winning. The championship points distributed in order for their standings in the challenge are: 12, 9, 6, 4, 3, 2, 1. The winner of the challenge wins immunity, and can choose to do another closest-to-the-hole challenge with a player of their choice, with the winner of that challenge winning five more championship points.

Rank	Player	Location 1	Location 2	Location 3	Total Distance	Points
1	Gloriana	11' 1	6' 3	12' 11	30' 3	12
2	Anya	3' 3	4' 5	25' 9	33' 2	9 (+5)
3	Selanee	7' 6	8' 0	24' 1	39' 7	6
4	Christina	2' 7	6' 4	35' 0	43' 11	4
5	Marcela	1' 2	31' 8	14' 6	47' 4	3
6	Kelly	10' 8	19' 2	25' 7	55' 5	2
7	Allison	11' 9	10' 1	43' 4	65' 2	1

The second stage is where the players are paired together based on their points leaderboard and they compete against each other where players take turns making the rule of the shot having to land within a specific number of feet and the player who accomplishes it in the fewest turns wins immunity and six championship points.

Kelly, Christina, and Selanee won the challenge over their opponents Marclea, Anya, and Allison, respectively. The remaining three players are headed to the elimination challenge. The first stage is a putting challenge where the players attempt to get the ball in the hole with putts of increasing lengths and the player who last misses a putt is safe.

Distance	Anya	Allison	Marcela
3	MAKE	MAKE	MAKE
4	MAKE	MAKE	MISS
5	MAKE	MAKE	
6	MAKE	MISS	

Allison and Marcela head to the second stage where they play two holes: The 10th hole from the forward tees (253 yards) and the same hole from the back tees (403 yards). The player with the higher score after 2 holes is eliminated.

Allison hit a perfect drive but Marcela missed way to the right. Marcela got the next on the green and two-putted for par while Allison hit her approach short of the green and made bogey. Allison proceeded to make further mistakes on the next hole, allowing Marcela to win, which she did finishing in style with a birdie.

==== Leaderboard ====
Player	Total Points	This Show
Marcela	**60**	3
Gloriana	**49**	12
Christina	**48**	10
Selanee	**36**	12
Anya	**14**	14
Kelly	**8**	8
Allison	**40** (OUT)	1

=== Show 7: Marooned ===
The immunity challenge features one-on-one matches for the players. Each match lasts one hole and the player who shoots a lower score that hole wins immunity and 15 championship points. A tie would result in a playoff from a particular location of the same hole. The matches are designated in such a way that the higher the player's points rankings, the more chances they have to win immunity. The first match features the two highest-ranked players, and the winner wins immunity while the loser goes to play third highest-ranked player and so on. The player with the lowest points, Kelly, is headed directly to the final match, which is the elimination challenge.

Match	Hole	Winner	Score	Loser	Score
1	2	Gloriana	5	Marcela	6
2	3	Christina	2^{P}	Marcela	2
3	4	Marcela	4	Selanee	5
4	6	Selanee	4	Anya	6

- P - won playoff

The players winning immunity have a points challenge where they can gain additional championship points. Each player picks a number between 1 and 4 twice to blindly choose what club they hit and what location they hit from. They hit two shots and try to land within a target and shots landing on the green can get between 1 and 4 points.

Player	Club	Shot	Points
Marcela	Wedge	Flop	7
Gloriana	9 Iron	Bunker	2
Christina	8 Iron	Trouble	1
Selanee	7 Iron	Pitch	2

Anya and Kelly head to the elimination challenge where they play the 9th hole. Kelly hits her approach to 39 feet but makes the long putt, tying Anya who hit it to 4 feet and made the putt. They head back to the tee for a continuation of the playoff, where Anya won with a par after Kelly missed the green on the approach and hit a poor chip.

==== Leaderboard ====
Player	Total Points	This Show
Marcela	**82**	22
Gloriana	**66**	17
Christina	**64**	16
Selanee	**53**	17
Anya	**14**	0
Kelly	**8** (OUT)	0

=== Show 8: Constant Bearing, Decreasing Range ===
The remaining players compete in three stages of the immunity challenge. The first stage is where they hit a wedge shot from 85 yards to the hole. They can choose to hit from 12 feet or take a chance, choosing a number between 1 and 10 and getting a random distance to hit it to. If they hit their shot within the specified distance, they gain 3 points. The process is done twice.

Player	Pick 1	Pick 2
Gloriana	**24**	**12**
Anya	**6**	9
Marcela	**21**	30
Christina	**20**	18
Selanee	**27**	15

- Bolded indicates successful attempt

The second stage is where players attempt to hit their ball within a target circle from 4 locations. Hitting within the target results in 2 points and holing the shot results in 10 points. If they miss, they can choose to take a mulligan and hit the shot again at the cost of 1 point, or they can choose to stop. They can have up to two mulligans.

Player	Location 1	Location 2	Location 3	Location 4
Christina	2	1	1	0
Anya	2	2	2	2
Gloriana	2	2	2	0
Marcela	2	2	2	2
Selanee	2	1	1	0

The third stage is where players attempt to hit their drives on the fairway. They can choose to hit up to three drives. Getting the drives on the fairway results in getting 1, 2 and 3 points respectively for the three drives in order. Though missing a drive results in points earned for this challenge resetting to zero. If a player hits all three drives in the fairway, they can hit a bonus drive worth five points.

At the end of the day, the three players with the lowest cumulative point total go to the elimination challenge. They play from three locations on the 6th hole: First on the green, second from the fairway, and third from the tee. The player with the highest aggregate score is eliminated.

Player	Location 1	Location 2	Location 3	Total
Selanee	1	2	4	**7 (IN)**
Christina	1	3	5	**9 (IN)**
Anya	2	3	5	10 (OUT)

==== Leaderboard ====
Player	Total Points	Stage 1	Stage 2	Stage 3
Marcela	**93**	3	8	0
Gloriana	**89**	6	6	11
Christina	**71**	3	4	0
Selanee	**60**	3	4	0
Anya	**51** (OUT)	3	8	11

=== Show 9: Come Hell Or High Water ===
In this show, everybody is given the chance to reach 100 points. The players play matches in round-robin format where everybody gets a chance to go one-on-one with every other player. The winner receives 15 points, and by the end of the challenge, the player with 100 points is exempt into the championship match. The points race ends after this show.

Match	Location	Yardage	Winner	Score	Loser	Score
1	Bunker	210	Selanee	3	Christina	4
2	Back Tee	475	Gloriana	5	Christina	6
3	Fairway	200	Selanee	3	Marcela	4
4	Front Tee	350	Marcela	3	Gloriana	4
5	Sidehill Lie	175	Gloriana	2	Selanee	3
6	Not played; outcome already decided					

At the end of the matches, both Marcela and Gloriana have reached 100 points so they head into a playoff to see who gets the exemption to the championship match. They play the 475 yard par-5 2nd hole. Both hit their drives in the fairway, with Marcela closer to the green than Gloriana. Gloriana lays up while Marcela goes for the green and ends up slightly short. Gloriana hits her approach 20 feet short while Marcela hits her chip to 7 feet. Gloriana misses the birdie putt while Marcela makes hers, resulting in Marcela winning.

The other two players, Selanee and Christina, head into the elimination challenge where they play two holes: The par-3 8th and the par-4 18th. On the first hole, Selanee stuffs her approach to 3 feet while Christina hits her approach 30 feet short. Christina misses her birdie putt but Selanee makes hers and gets a one-shot lead heading to the next hole. On the next hole, both hit their drives on the fairway, but Christina hits her approach to 22 feet while Selanee hits hers long and left over the green. Selanee hits her tricky chip shot to 8 feet. Christina misses her birdie putt but Selanee makes her par putt to win the elimination challenge.

=== Show 10: Daughters of Atlas ===
The eliminated contestants return to the course for a team competition where they get divided into three teams, with the remaining contestants Marcela, Gloriana, and Selanee as team captains. After the captains finished making the picks, Marcela's team consists of Shannon, Allison, and Kelly (in the order of selection); Gloriana's team consists of Christina, Zakiya, and Aubrey; and Selanee's team consists of Anya, Natalia, and Meghan.

There are 4 locations and each player on each team chooses 1 of the 4 locations. Each player has 2 attempts to gain points between 1 and 3 depending on the proximity to the hole the shot ends up. For the final location, the points the player earns is doubled.

Team Order	Location 1	Location 2	Location 3	Location 4	Total Points
Allison; Marcela; Shannon; Kelly	5	6	3	0	**14**
**Gloriana**; **Zakiya**; **Aubrey**; **Christina**	**5**	**5**	**5**	**6**	**21**
Selanee; Natalia; Meghan; Anya	6	2	3	0	**11**

With Gloriana's team winning the challenge, Gloriana gets $2,000 while the other three team members get $1,000 each.

Next, Gloriana and Selanee head for the elimination challenge where they play 5 holes and the player with the highest score after those 5 holes is eliminated. On the first hole, the par 4 17th, they both make par after Gloriana misses the green but hits a putt to a tap-in range, while Selanee hits to 18 feet but leaves her birdie putt short.

On the next hole, the par 3 8th, Selanee lands just short of the green while Gloriana lands in a greenside bunker. Gloriana hits it to 12 feet but misses the par putt. Selanee lags her putt to 6 feet and makes the comebacker for par to take a one-shot lead. Selanee extends the lead on the next hole where her approach lands to 5 feet and she makes the putt, while Gloriana misses the green long and misses the 25 footer from the back of the green.

On the 4th hole (the par 4 10th), Gloriana hits her approach 35 feet short while Selanee hits to 20 feet on the green. Gloriana misses but Selanee makes her putt again and carries a three-shot lead heading to the last hole, the par 5 6th hole.

On the final hole, Selanee almost hits her ball out-of-bounds but luckily hits a tree before going OB. Gloriana hits the fairway with a chance to capitalize, but hits her layup second shot in a bunker. Selanee pitches out back to the fairway and hits her third to 20 feet on the green. Gloriana misses the green from the bunker, thus ending her chances and Selanee wins the elimination challenge with an easy two-putt par.

Hole	17	8	9	10	6	Total
Par	4	3	4	4	5	20
**Selanee**	4	3	3	3	5	**18 (IN)**
Gloriana	4	4	4	4	5	21 (OUT)

=== Show 11: X Marks the Spot ===
In the final show, the final two contestants Marcela and Selanee play an 18-hole match play with the winner winning the Big Break Atlantis.

On the first hole, Marcela misses the green long but sinks a crucial 9 foot par putt that barely lips in to halve the hole with Selanee who made a 4-foot par putt. They both miss the green in regulation on the 2nd but halve the hole with pars again. On the 3rd hole, Marcela stuffs her approach to 4 feet and makes the birdie putt, winning the hole over Selanee whose 25 footer for birdie stops an inch short of dropping.

They both halve the 4th hole when Marcela misses a 10 footer for the win. But Marcela wins the 5th hole to go 2 up with an 18-foot putt. They again halve the 6th hole with pars.

On the par 4 7th hole, Marcela hits her drive well left, and her approach flies over the green. Selanee is on the fairway with a good chance to capitalize, but chunks her approach shot 60 yards short. She hits her approach to 12 feet and misses the par putt, losing the hole to Marcela who pitches to within tap-in range for a par.

On the 8th hole, Selanee misses the green while Marcela hits to 50 feet on the green. Selanee pitches to 6 feet while Marcela lags her putt to 7 feet. Marcela makes her par putt but Selanee misses, bringing Marcela's lead to 4 up.

On the 9th, Selanee and Marcela hit their approaches to 12 and 20 feet, respectively. Marcela misses her putt, giving Selanee an opportunity to win her first hole, but she misses as well.

On the 10th, Marcela hits her approach short-sided in a bunker. Selanee, with another opportunity to capitalize, hits her approach to 30 feet but three-putts for bogey after running her first putt 6 feet past the hole and missing the comebacker. Meanwhile, Marcela hits her bunker shot to 6 feet and makes the par putt.

On the 11th, Marcela goes to 6 up with a good drive and an approach to 7 feet, while Selanee makes a mess of the hole with a drive in the bunker and a poor chip to 15 feet, making a bogey and losing the hole.

They halve the 12th hole with pars, then on the par-5 13th hole Marcela gives Selanee a slight opening with a poor drive into a bunker. Selanee hits a good drive in the fairway and her second shot lands just short of the green. Marcela lays up but hits her third shot short of the green. Selanee hits a poor chip to 30 feet, resulting in a two-putt par. That turns out to be enough to win her first hole of the day when Marcela also hits a poor chip to 12 feet and misses the par putt, making her first bogey of the day. However, the match ends at the 14th hole when they halve the hole with pars, resulting in Marcela winning the match 5 and 4.

Hole	1	2	3	4	5	6	7	8	9	10	11	12	13	14	15	16	17	18
Par	4	5	3	4	4	5	4	3	4	4	4	3	5	3	4	5	4	4
**Marcela**	4	5	2	4	3	5	4	3	4	4	3	3	6	3	-	-	-	-
**Selanee**	4	5	3	4	4	5	5	4	4	5	5	3	5	3	-	-	-	-
Status	AS	AS	M1	M1	M2	M2	M3	M4	M4	M5	M6	M6	M5	M5	M 5 & 4			
