= Oneda Maryon Castillo =

Golf instructor

Oneda Maryon Castillo (born April 13, 1952) is a Global Education Instructor for the Ladies Professional Golfers Association (LPGA). She joined the LPGA in 1997. She is the third African American woman to achieve Class A status as a LPGA Teaching and Club Professional (T&CP), doing so in 2003. As of 2022 she is one of only 15 African American women golfers to become a Class A LPGA Teaching Professional.

Oneda conquered the links in her 50th state on January 13, 2018, at the Kapalua Golf Course in Lahaina, Hawaii. This occurred on the same day as the fake missile notification in Hawaii, which garnered her participation in another historic event. She shared all the exciting details of her journey with the LPGA Women's Network in a video.

Oneda now works as the Vice President of the Women's Golf and Travel Concierge company.

== Early life ==
Castillo was born April 13, 1952, in Akron, Ohio, as the second of three children to Walter and Ruth Scott. She was raised by her mother, along with her two brothers, in Cleveland Ohio and Buffalo, New York, where she graduated from Bennett High School in 1970. She went on to study engineering at Lakeland College in Mentor, Ohio. Pursuit of her vocation led her to become one of the only female machinists making nuclear reactors for submarines. At the same time, having played all the sports growing up, her sports interests led her to sign up for the National Women's Football League (NWFL). In 1980 she played for the Cleveland Brewers.

To work toward inclusion was sparked for her in 1962, fourth grader, Castillo and a few of her classmates, were bused to an all-white elementary school to prove that there was integration in Cleveland, Ohio where she was growing up. However, instead of being a part of the class, the young students were isolated from the rest of the student population and taught in a classroom alone.

Castillo remembers her aunt, Oneda Holzendorf, as the first golfer in her family. She became interested in the sport when she was thirty, after her husband, Ron Castillo, coaxed her onto the tee with a golf club.

Castillo is the Director of Golf for the Women in Golf Foundation. Additionally, she works passionately with The Georgia State Golf Association's Adaptive Golf Program and The PGA Hope Programs. These community clinics service veterans and civilians with physical, cognitive, and/or sensory impairments. She has added valuable influence and input into multiple organization throughout the country.

Castillo, alongside Lajean Gould, Founder of the Women in Golf Foundation, has hosted the National Women's Collegiate Golf Championship, which is an annual three-day, spring competitive golf event started in 1994. The event celebrates 27 years this year.

=== LPGA Instructor and Certified Club Fitter ===
In 1997, Castillo joined the teaching ranks of the LPGA as a Certified Golf Teaching Professional. She is the third African American golfing professional to achieve Class A Status as a LPGA Teaching and Club Professional (T&CP), studying many hours and attending numerous seminars and workshops, culminating with testing and placing at the top of her group for the playing ability test, in 2003.

Castillo was named one of the top 50 LPGA Teachers by LPGA Women's Golf Magazine in 2017 and has remained on that list through 2023. She has taught LPGA Golf for Women's Clinics, Tiger Woods Golf Clinics, Hook a Kid on Golf Clinics, LPGA/US Girls Golf Clinic, Inc. and Odyssey Travel Golf Clinics. She taught Zakiya Randall who became the only Atlantean to win a medal and first place in the U.S. Women's Open local in Atlanta. And who was introduced to the sport through First Tee of Atlanta where Castillo was an instructor. Castillo serves as a National Evaluator for the LPGA. She has taught alongside Tiger Woods at his Tiger Woods Golf Clinics at Brownsmill Golf Course. Oneda worked alongside Charlie Sifford son of the African American professional golfer Charlie Sifford who helped desegregate the PGA Tour and also taught alongside Renee Powell, the second African American female golfer to play on the LPGA Tour.

Castillo's decision to join the LPGA was influenced by the fact that the 13 original founders of the organization made the decision to exclude the "Caucasian Only" clause that existed in the original PGA charter. Castillo has met many of the founders including Patty Berg, Louise Suggs, Betty Jameson, Shirley Spork, Bettye Danoff and Marilynn Smith.

In 2014, she was appointed as a Global Instructor to the newly formed LPGA Global Education Program and is the only African American on that team. Each year, Castillo with the Women In Golf Foundation hosts the Spring National Women's Collegiate Golf Championship.

== Awards ==
- In 2017, Castillo was named one of the Top 50 Teachers by the LPGA Women's Golf Magazine.
- Castillo was awarded the Lifetime Achievement Award in 2015 by President Barack Obama for her lifetime commitment to building a stronger nation through volunteer service.
- Castillo was named Club Fitter of the Year in 2015 by the African American Golfers' Digest.
- Castillo was inducted into the African American Golfers Hall of Fame in 2014.
- In 2012, Castillo was selected as the LPGA Teaching and Club Professional Southeast Section Teacher of the Year.

== Amateur wins ==
- Cleveland Metro Parks Championship
- Call Post Championship
- City of Euclid Championship
- Placed first in her LPGA Qualifying Tournament
