= Lori Atsedes =

American professional golfer (born 1964)

Personal information
- Nationality: United States
- Born: March 29, 1964 (age 62) Rochester, New York, U.S.

Career
- Sport: Golf
- Turned professional: 1987
- Former tours: LPGA Tour; Futures Tour
- Professional wins: 26

Number of wins by tour
- Epson Tour: 7
- Other: 19

Best results in LPGA major championships
- Chevron Championship: DNP
- Women's PGA C'ship: CUT: 1999
- U.S. Women's Open: CUT: 1992, 1996, 1997, 1999, 2003
- du Maurier Classic: CUT: 1999
- Women's British Open: DNP

Lori Atsedes (born March 29, 1964) is an American professional golfer. She was the all-time career money leader on the Futures Tour.

Atsedes was born in Rochester, New York and raised in Ithaca, New York. She turned pro in 1987 and has played on several professional tours, including the Futures Tour, the Florida Sunshine tour, the Central Florida Challenge Tour and the LPGA Tour, where she was a member from 1998 to 2001 and in 2003.

In 2008, Atsedes finished 3rd on The Golf Channel's competitive reality show The Big Break, filmed in Hawaii in December, 2007. Atsedes won a gift certificate to Dick's Sporting Goods after finishing first in the season long points challenge, and also won $5000 for earning the most points in a grid challenge during an early episode.

Atsedes is a golf professional at the Tres Rios golf course in Goodyear, Arizona.

== Controversy ==
In one episode of The Big Break, there was a ruling issue on a hook/fade wall challenge when Kim Welch and Atsedes questioned whether another contestant, Christina Lecuyer, had stepped on a divot, therefore improving her lie. Welch caused the divot, playing immediately prior to Lecuyer, but did not stamp down the divot after finishing her shots. The Golf Channel rules officials decided that Lecuyer had in fact breached a rule and took her points away. This caused outrage and personal attacks on Atsedes on The Golf Channel discussion boards. This ruling is largely viewed as incorrect by the people on the discussion boards, as: 1. Lecuyer had not yet placed her ball; 2. The players were playing preferred lies; 3. The ball was not being played "through the hole"; and 4. As a general rule, players had been allowed to rake traps and return the ground to original playing position prior to placing the ball. Welch had conceded these facts, but Atsedes persisted, upsetting many fans of the show.

Atsedes was involved in a series long feud with Lecuyer, her roommate on the show, particularly after Lecuyer was caught saying, "Choke!" prior to Tina Miller's pivotal shot during a team challenge. The cattiness was a central theme of the edited programs for the bulk of the series, and also played out during the Confessionals, a video the players tape every night during filming.

Atsedes wrote a weekly blog on the Golf Channel website during The Big Break, often commenting on her version of the dispute with Lecuyer.

== Professional wins (26) ==
=== Futures Tour wins (7) ===
- 1994 (1) The Equitable FUTURES Classic
- 1996 (2) Ironwood FUTURES Classic, Brickyard Plantation FUTURES Classic
- 1997 (1) The Eaglebrooke Lakeland FUTURES Classic
- 1998 (1) Gulf Telephone FUTURES Classic
- 2005 (1) Lawrence FUTURES Golf Classic
- 2007 (1) Lakeland Duramed FUTURES Classic

=== Other wins (19) ===
- Winner of 17 events on the Florida Sunshine Tour
- Winner of two events on the Central Florida Challenge Tour
