= Big Break Ireland =

Season of television series

Big Break Ireland was the 16th edition of the Golf Channel reality show, The Big Break. It was contested in the K Club in Straffan, County Kildare, Ireland. It premiered on September 20, 2011. The eventual winner of the show was Mark Murphy, who won $50,000 and two exemptions to European Tour events, the Trophée Hassan II and the Irish Open.

== Contestants ==
=== Team Liffey ===
Contestant	Age	Hometown
Mallory Blackwelder	24	Versailles, Kentucky
Annie Brophy	24	Spokane, Washington
Kelly Jacques	25	Thornton, Colorado
Matt Melrose	27	Mulanje, Malawi
Mark Murphy	34	Waterville, Ireland
Andy Walker	36	Phoenix, Arizona

=== Team Straffan ===
Contestant	Age	Hometown
Joe Campbell	23	Cheltenham, England
Bennett Maki	26	Atlanta, Georgia
Nina Rodriguez	27	San Jose, California
Nicole Smith	24	Riverside, California
Julien Trudeau	30	Montréal, Canada
Whitney Wright	26	Greenville, South Carolina

== Elimination Chart ==
Contestant	Ep. 1	Ep. 2	Ep. 3	Ep. 4	Ep. 5	Ep. 6	Ep. 7	Ep. 8	Ep. 9	Ep. 10
Mark										
Julien										
Mallory										
Andy										
Nina										
Nicole										
Joe										
Kelly										
Bennett										
Matt										
Annie										
Whitney										

Contestant is in Team Straffan
Contestant is in Team Liffey
Contestant WON the Big Break
Contestant won $5000 and is safe from elimination
Contestant is safe from elimination
Contestant is eligible for elimination but was not chosen
Contestant saved themself from advancing in the Elimination Challenge
Contestant participated and won the Elimination Challenge
Contestant was Eliminated
Contestant withdrew (Bennett withdrew due to appendicitis)

== Outline ==
Week	Filmed	Aired	Course	Holes	Straffan Captain	Liffey Captain	Course Challenges	Elimination Challenge
1	May 16	September 20	Ryder Cup Course	11, 18	Bennett	**Mark**	Glass Break, Alternate Shot	Sudden Death
2	May 17	September 27	Smurfit Course	13	**Julien**	Mallory	Skills Challenge (5 Locations)	Skills Challenge (3 Locations)
3	May 18	October 4	Smurfit Course	7, 17, 18	**Nina**	Matt	Team Alternate Shot, Green Hitting, Chipping Relay	2-Hole Stroke Play
4	May 19	October 11	Smurfit Course	4, 15, 16	**Nicole**	Kelly	Wall Flop, Up-and-Down, Chip-in Contest	2-Hole Stroke Play
5	May 20	October 18	Ryder Cup Course	14, 16, 17, 18	Joe	**Andy**	Team Stroke Play	Skills Challenge (4 Locations)
6	May 22	October 25	Portmarnock Golf Club	8, 18	Nicole	**Mallory**	Skills Challenge (9 Locations)	2-Hole Stroke Play
7	May 23	November 1	Ryder Cup Course	7, 8, 9, 10, 17, 18	N/A	**Mark**	Scramble, Best Ball, Aggregate Score, Alternate Shot	2-Hole Stroke Play
8	May 24	November 8	Smurfit Course	4, 7, 17, 18	N/A	N/A	Closest-to-Hole (4 Locations), Sudden Death	2-Hole Stroke Play
9	May 25	November 15	Smurfit Course	12, 13, 15, 16	N/A	N/A	Skills Challenge (2 x 3 Locations)	4-Hole Stroke Play
10	May 27	November 22	Ryder Cup Course	All	N/A	N/A	18-Hole Match Play	Sudden Death

- Bolded name indicates winning captain
- When there are less than 3 players left on a team, there is no captain.

== Details ==
The show was hosted by Golf Channel's Tom Abbott and Stephanie Sparks. The 12 contestants were divided into two teams, Straffan and Liffey, with 3 men and 3 women on each team. The contestants live in two houses adjacent to each other. Every day, each team must select one captain, and the teams would compete in a series of skills challenges, and by the end of the day, the team with the most points earns immunity and the team members are safe from elimination. The captain of the winning team earns $5,000, while the captain of the losing team goes to elimination and has to pick one teammate to compete with them. The winning teammate gets to stay on the show for at least another week, while the loser of the elimination challenge is eliminated from the show.

=== Show 1: Cead Mile Falite: A Hundred Thousand Welcomes ===
The captain for Team Straffan is Bennett and the captain for Team Liffey is Mark. The first immunity challenge was the Glass Break Challenge. Players go one-on-one and the player who hits the ball into the glass frame first wins. 5 players from each team compete first, and after the 5 players have gone, the outcome of the 6th match determines which team wins and gets one point. The 6th person of the leading team gets a 5-second head start for each match that the team won more times than the other team.

Match	Straffan	Liffey	# of attempts	Time
1	Whitney	Mallory	1	2
2	Joe	Mark	4	11
3	Nina	Kelly	7	23
4	Nicole	Matt	3	9
5	Julien	Annie	1	3
6	Bennett	Andy^{1}	3	(15 + 8)^{2}

^1 Since Team Liffey won the last match, they win this challenge
^2 Team Straffan had a 15-second head start due to a 3 shot lead

With Team Liffey leading 1–0, the next stage of the immunity challenge was an alternate-shot format in which each team forms 3 pairs and they play one hole, the 11th hole of the Ryder Cup Course. The team with the lower score wins 1 point and if they are halved, both teams get a half-point. First team to 4 points win immunity.

Match	Straffan	Liffey	Straffan Score	Liffey Score
1	Bennett/Nicole	Mark/Annie	4	5
2	Joe/Whitney	Matt/Mallory	5	5
3	Julien/Nina	Andy/Kelly	4	4
4	Joe/Whitney	Mark/Annie	5	4
5	Bennett/Nicole	Andy/Kelly	4	5
6	Julien/Nina	Matt/Mallory	4	4

With both teams tied at 3.5 points, they head to a playoff where the captains from each team chooses a player to play with and using alternate shot, the team with the lowest score wins. Mark and Annie make a par while Bennett and Nicole make a bogey so Team Liffey wins the immunity challenge.

Bennett picks Whitney to go to the Elimination Challenge, a sudden death challenge where they both play the 18th hole over and over until one player shoots a higher score and that player gets eliminated.

They halved the first sudden death hole with birdies when they both reached greenside in two and got up-and-down. They both hit poor drives on the second hole so they both laid up and made par. They both reached greenside in two again on the third hole but Whitney missed a 12-foot birdie and Bennett made his, so Whitney was eliminated.

Player	1	2	3	Total
Bennett	4	5	4	13 (IN)
Whitney	4	5	5	14 (OUT)

=== Show 2: Go Green or Go Home ===
The captain for Team Straffan is Julien while the captain for Team Liffey is Mallory. This challenge is a skills challenge where there are 5 head-to-head matches and each team member has to pick one of the 5 designated locations to play the hole from. The team with the lowest score from that location wins a point, a tie gets a half-point each. First team to 3 points wins immunity. Due to the uneven teams, Annie from Team Liffey is sat out.

Match	Yardage	Location	Straffan	Liffey	Straffan Score	Liffey Score
1	331	Tee box	Nicole	Kelly	4	4
2	188	Fairway	Bennett	Matt	3	2
3	152	Bunker	Joe	Andy	3	3
4	95	Rough	Julien	Mark	2	3
5	33	Rough	Nina	Mallory	2	3

Team Straffan wins the Immunity Challenge with the score of 3–2. Team Liffey is headed into elimination challenge and the captain had to pick two contestants. Mallory chose Annie and Kelly.

First off, the three players had a closest-to-the-hole contest in which they hit two shots from a location and the player who has the closest total distance to the hole wins and is safe from elimination. Players who miss the green were disqualified and headed into elimination. Both Annie and Kelly missed the green on their first shot, so all Mallory needed to do was to hit the green on both shots to save herself from being eliminated, which she did.

So Annie and Kelly head into elimination, where they play their ball from 3 different locations, and the player with the lowest score for those 3 locations wins the elimination challenge, and the losing player is eliminated.

They both made 3 for the first 2 locations to stay even, but Annie hit it into the water on the third location to lose to Kelly.

Match	1	2	3
Location	Fairway	Rough	Deep rough
Yardage	135	114	93
Kelly	3	3	2
Annie	3	3	4

- Kelly: 3-3-2=8 (IN)
- Annie: 3-3-4=10 (OUT)

=== Show 3: The Fighting Irish ===
Nina is the team captain for Team Straffan while Matt is the captain for Team Liffey. The first challenge is a team alternate shot event, in which each team plays the Par-5 7th at the Smurfit Course, and each player plays one shot each. The winning team gets one point. For Team Liffey, their decided order was Matt-Andy-Mark-Kelly-Mallory, while for Team Straffan their decided order was Joe-Julien-Nina-Nicole-Bennett, with Bennett out last because he was feeling sick.

For Team Liffey, Matt hit a perfect drive and Andy hit a stellar long iron shot to 7 feet, and Mark made the eagle putt. Then it was Team Straffan's turn. Joe also hit a perfect drive, and Julien hit a decent approach to 30 feet. Nina's eagle putt missed short right, so Team Straffan makes a birdie but they lose the challenge, and Team Liffey has a 1–0 lead.

In the second stage of the immunity challenge, players must try to land on the green from 10 different locations, from 70 yards to 160 yards, the yardage increasing by 10 every attempt. Players from each team take turns to do it, and one team goes first. When that team misses the green from a yardage, the other team must try to beat the team by hitting the green every time up to the yardage in which they missed at. If they succeed, they win a point. The team which gets to 2 points first is safe from elimination.

Bennett is sick and had to withdraw from the challenge, so they play with only 4 players. Team Straffan went with the order Joe-Julien-Nina-Nicole and so on, and Team Liffey went with Matt-Andy-Kelly-Mark, and Mallory had to be sat out due to the uneven teams.

Team Straffan was able to hit the green 7 times with Nicole missing the green on the 8th location. Then it was Liffey's turn to answer. They also found the green the first 7 locations, then Mark's shot on the 8th location hit the green but it spun off and was off the green by inches, so they tie this challenge and have to move on to the next challenge, with scores of 1.5-0.5.

The next challenge is a chipping relay, in which players from each team must take turns chipping the ball onto the green. The ball must land on the green after each chip and they also must be progressively closer to the hole than the previous shot each chip. When one team fails to do so, the other team must use more chip shots than the previous team to win the challenge. Kelly had to sit out in this challenge due to the uneven teams.

Team Liffey:

Turn	Player	Distance
1	Mark	105
2	Mallory	100
3	Andy	88
4	Matt	81
5	Mark	87 (LOSE)

Team Straffan:

Turn	Player	Distance
1	Nicole	112
2	Joe	107
3	Nina	91
4	Julien	85
5	Nicole	37 (WIN)

Team Straffan won the third challenge so the score is tied at 1.5 each. So now the two team captains would go into a closest-to-the-hole playoff, with Nina against Matt, and the captain who hits the closest to the hole wins the immunity challenge and the other team would go into elimination. Nina won the playoff so Team Straffan is same and Team Liffey is into elimination.

Matt chose Mallory to compete in the elimination challenge. They play a 2-hole playoff on the 17th and 18th holes of the Smurfit course and the player with the lower score is safe and the higher score player is eliminated.

They both missed the green on the 17th but Mallory took a one-shot lead when Matt was unable to get up-and-down for par. On the 18th, Matt had a good opportunity to either pull even or win the elimination challenge with a 15-foot birdie putt, but he three-putted from there to lose to Mallory.

Hole	17	18	Total
Par	3	5	8
Mallory	3	6	9 (IN)
Matt	4	6	10 (OUT)

=== Show 4: Nothing Is Done Without Effort ===
Bennett was diagnosed with appendicitis and had to go through surgery, so he was out of the show, and both teams are now left with 4 players apiece. Nicole was the captain for Team Straffan and Kelly was the captain for Team Liffey.

The first immunity challenge was the wall flop, in which players were paired into 2 teams of 2 for each side, and one of the players had to hit a flop shot over a wall and the next player tries to putt the ball. The team with the lowest number of strokes wins.

Match	Straffan	Liffey	Straffan Score	Liffey Score
1	Nina/Nicole	Mark/Kelly	3	3
2	Julien/Joe	Andy/Mallory	2	2

Since both matches were halved, the teams now have 1 point each. The next challenge is the up-and-down challenge in which in pairs, one team has to hit a chip shot and the other player putts, and their only objective is to get the ball up-and-down, and the score is immaterial.

Match	Straffan	Liffey	Straffan	Liffey
1	Nicole/Joe	Andy/Mallory	No	No
2	Nicole/Joe	Andy/Mallory	Yes	Yes
3	Julien/Nina	Mark/Kelly	Yes	Yes

The matches are still tied, so the teams go into the third challenge. The third challenge is a chip-in challenge, in which players from each team take turns to try to chip into the hole. The team that takes the fewest shots before someone hits it into the hole wins the immunity challenge. Team Straffan went in the order of Joe-Nicole-Julien-Nina while Liffey went in the order of Mark-Kelly-Mallory-Andy.

On Team Straffan's third shot, Julien nearly chipped in but the ball lipped out. Instead, it was their 6th shot where Nicole was finally able to chip in. Team Liffey however, failed to chip in within 6 attempts and lost the immunity challenge. Mark likely had the biggest heartbreak of them all when twice his ball came within an inch of getting in the hole.

Team Straffan won the challenge. Team Liffey's captain Kelly chose Mallory so now Mallory has gone into elimination 3 times in a row. This elimination challenge is a 2-hole playoff on Holes 15 and 16 of the Smurfit Course and the player with the lower aggregate score is safe and the higher score player is eliminated.

They both halved the 15th hole with pars, and they both hit good approach shots into 16. Kelly missed her 12-foot birdie putt but Mallory made her 8 footer to survive her third consecutive elimination challenge.

Hole	15	16	Total
Par	4	4	8
Mallory	4	3	7 (IN)
Kelly	4	4	8 (OUT)

=== Show 5: Erin Go Bragh: Ireland Forever ===
Joe was the captain for Team Straffan and Andy was the captain for Team Liffey for the day. The challenge for this show was playing Holes 14, 17, and 18 of the Ryder Cup Course. Each team member plays one of the three holes, and in the end, the team with the lowest total scores win immunity. Because Team Straffan has one more member than Liffey, their team captain has to wait until the other three finish playing, and then he randomly draws out a number to determine which hole he would play.

The two teams are even after the first hole but Team Liffey takes a two-shot lead when Nina from Team Straffan hit it in the water. Team Liffey maintains the 2-shot lead the next hole when both players stuff their iron shots within 5 feet and make the eagle putts.

Hole	14	17	18	Total
Par	3	4	5	12
Straffan	Julien	Nina	Nicole	
Liffey	Mark	Mallory	Andy	
Straffan; Score	3	6	3	12 (E)
Liffey; Score	3	4	3	10 (-2)

So Joe is up next and he had to make an eagle on his hole to tie even with Team Liffey. With a random draw he draws out the 17th hole and had to hole-out on his second shot for them to not lose. But Joe hit it into the water on the first shot so it's over immediately. Team Liffey wins the first time in three weeks and Team Straffan heads to elimination.

Instead of picking Nina who was an obvious pick, Joe picked Julien because Julien was the strongest player on the team and having him eliminated would increase his own chances of winning the Big Break. So they go into the elimination challenge in which they had to play the 16th hole of the Ryder Cup Course from 4 different locations. The player who has the lowest number of strokes after the 4 locations wins and the losing player is eliminated.

Julien, apparently flustered by Joe's surprising decision, hit a poor chip in the first location to go one down. Joe had an opportunity to take a two-shot lead on the third location but missed a 10 footer to leave the door open for Julien. On the last location, Joe hit a drive into a hazard and made a bogey 6, and Julien shut the door on him by making a birdie to win.

Match	1	2	3	4
Location	Rough	Bunker	Fairway	Tee box
Yardage	12	28	145	530
Julien	3	3	3	4
Joe	2	3	3	6

- Julien: 3-3-3-4=13 (IN)
- Joe: 2-3-3-6=14 (OUT)

=== Show 6: Emerald Isle Road Trip ===
This episode differs from the other episodes such that in this show, the contestants are driven to Portmarnock Golf Club to compete, an hour's drive away from their usual venue, to compete in a true links setting. Nicole is the captain for Team Straffan and Mallory is the captain for Team Liffey.

This challenge is a skills challenge in which the contestants will go one-on-one with the other team, going head-to-head to play 9 different locations, and the team member with the lower score from that location wins a full point and if the scores are the same, then each team gets half a point. The first team getting to 5 points would win the immunity challenge.

Everybody played well with the exception of Nina, who struggled mightily in the blustery conditions and lost two points to Team Liffey. She three-putted from 7 feet in her first location and three-putted from 20 feet in her next location. Julien also caught a bad break for both his locations, when he took a one-stroke penalty when the ball oscillated after addressing the ball on his first location, and when Andy made a 30-foot putt on Julien's next location. As a result, Team Straffan lost after playing only 7 of the 9 locations.

Match	Location	Yardage	Straffan	Liffey	Straffan Score	Liffey Score
1	Bunker	12	Nina	Andy	4	3
2	Bunker	21	Nicole	Mallory	3	3
3	Bunker	34	Julien	Mark	3	3
4	Rough	23	Nicole	Mark	3	3
5	Rough	65	Nina	Mallory	5	4
6	Rough	114	Julien	Andy	3	2
7	Fairway	35	Nicole	Mallory	3	3
8	Fairway	75	Nina	Andy	N/A	N/A
9	Fairway	125	Julien	Mark	N/A	N/A

Nicole, being the captain of Team Straffan, chooses Nina for the elimination challenge, where they play Holes 8 and 18 of Portmarnock Golf Club, and the golfer with the lower score on those two holes win and get to stay on the show.

Nina, despite all her struggles in the previous two shows, appeared to suddenly find her game and she hit a brilliant approach to 10 feet on the first hole and made birdie to take a two-shot lead on Nicole who bogeyed the hole after an errant second shot. Nina sealed the deal when she again stuffed her approach to 12 feet the next hole and two-putted to eliminate Nicole.

Hole	8	18	Total
Par	4	4	8
Nina	3	4	7 (IN)
Nicole	5	4	9 (OUT)

=== Show 7: The Best Ships Are Friendships ===
For this episode, since there are only two members left in Team Straffan, Julien and Nina are co-captains so if they win, they would share the $5000 and get $2500 each. Meanwhile, Team Liffey had to pick a captain and Andy was supposed to be the captain, but he resigned his captaincy to Mark. His strategy was to avoid getting himself eliminated, but the members from Team Straffan considered it as a move of cowardice.

The challenge for the day is that they play Holes 7-10 of the K Club Ryder Cup Course, and each hole they play in different formats. Hole 7 they play scramble, Hole 8 they play best-ball, Hole 9 they play aggregate score (both teammates' score added together), and Hole 10 they play alternate shot. The team that wins the hole gets one point and halves get half a point each team. First team getting to 2.5 points wins immunity.

Scramble is a format where two playing partners play a shot from the same location, and they can decide to pick one of the two locations to play their next shots from, and so on until they finish the hole. As a result, when Andy and Nina hit erratic drives on the first hole, their partners were able to find the fairway and both teams would make par from there.

On the next hole, Mark and Nina both hit poor tee shots and would make bogey, but their teammates Mallory and Julien respectively both hit good tee shots and made par to halve the hole.

The next hole, the aggregate score format, was the turning point in the matches. Everyone except for Nina made a par 4. But since Nina from Straffan made a bogey 5, the aggregate score for Team Straffan is 9 and Team Liffey is 8, so Team Liffey won the hole.

On the final hole alternate shot, Mark from Team Liffey hit a perfect drive down the fairway while Julien hit it into the trees so Nina had to punch out for the second shot. Andy tried to go for the green but hit a poor second shot that left Mallory with a difficult uphill third shot. Meanwhile, Julien hit his third shot 45 feet to the hole. Mallory chili-dipped her third shot into the bunker right ahead of her, and Mark skulled the bunker shot 25 feet past the hole. Andy missed the par putt and Team Liffey is in for a bogey 6. Meanwhile, Nina from Straffan lagged her birdie putt to 9 feet, but Julien missed the par putt. So the hole is halved and Team Liffey wins the immunity challenge, and Julien and Nina are headed to elimination.

			Straffan		Liffey			
Hole	Par	Format	Julien	Nina	Mark	Andy	Mallory	Winner
7	4	Scramble	4		N/A	4		Tie
8	3	Best-Ball	3	4	4	N/A	3	Tie
9	4	Aggregate	4	5	4	4	N/A	Liffey
10	5	Alternate-Shot	6		6			Tie

In the elimination challenge, Julien and Nina would play Holes 17 and 18 of the Ryder Cup Course, and the player with the lower score is safe, and the higher score player gets eliminated.

Nina hit her first drive so far left into the water that she had to re-tee the drive with a one-stroke penalty, so she made triple bogey out of the gates and was immediately two strokes behind. On the next hole, Julien went for the green in 2, but his approach went so far beyond the hole that it rolled onto a cart path and nearly went out of bounds before a bush helped push the ball back in bounds. Meanwhile, Nina hit her approach into the water and had to settle for a par 5, which allowed Julien, who needed to make a 6 or better, cruise to an easy win.

Hole	17	18	Total
Par	4	5	9
Julien	5	5	10 (IN)
Nina	7	5	12 (OUT)

=== Show 8: Gaofer Golfaire: Windy Golfer ===
In this episode, because Julien was the only person left in the show for Team Straffan, it would be impossible to play team competition, so Julien moves into the Team Liffey house and they are no longer teams, and it's now every golfer for themselves.

The first challenge is a closest-to-the-hole contest, in which the players hit the ball from 4 different locations, trying to get as close to the hole as possible, and the player with the lowest cumulative distance to the hole wins the contest.

After three locations, Mark was first place by a wide margin and all he had to do for the last location was to get it within 14 feet. But he chunked the bunker shot and it barely got out, so Andy won the contest.

Match	Location	Shot Type	Andy	Julien	Mallory	Mark
1	Fringe	Bump-and-Run	6.4	12.9	17.1	6.9
2	Rough	Chip Shot	10.3	8.5	5.7	5.1
3	Rough	Pitch Shot	7.9	6.8	4.1	3.7
4	Sand	Bunker Shot	5.3	3.5	12.2	29.5
Totals			29.9	31.7	39.1	45.2

Because Andy won the closest-to-the-hole contest, he gets to pick and player he wants to compete against in the immunity challenge. The player who wins the immunity challenge is safe for the day, while the losing player advances to the elimination challenge. They would continue to play the Par-5 7th hole of the Smurfit Course until one player shoots a higher score. Andy chose Mallory.

Andy hit a good drive and tried to go for the green in two, landing just short. He hit his chip shot to 7 feet but missed the birdie putt and halved the hole with Mallory. So they play the hole again. Andy hit a bad drive and had to lay up. His third shot landed 30 feet to the hole. He lagged it to three feet but he shockingly lipped out the par putt to lose the challenge to Mallory, who now has won immunity for the day.

Player	1	2	Total
Mallory	5	5	10 (WIN)
Andy	5	6	11 (LOSE)

Next, the two players who did not play the immunity challenge had to square off and play the 7th hole until one player shoots a higher score. The player who wins is safe and onto the next show, while the losing player joins Andy, who previously lost to Mallory, in the elimination challenge.

Mark was just short of the green in two, but hit a poor chip to 20 feet and missed the birdie putt. Julien hit a poor second shot that landed 65 yards right of the hole, but he hit a brilliant recovery shot to 10 feet and had a chance to win the match. But he missed the putt to halve the hole with Mark who also made a par. They both laid up the second time they played the hole but Mark stuffed his third shot to 5 feet and made the putt to save himself from going to the elimination challenge.

Player	1	2	Total
Mark	5	4	9 (WIN)
Julien	5	5	10 (LOSE)

For the elimination challenge, Julien and Andy are to play the 17th and 18th holes of the Smurfit course and the player who gets the lowest scores is safe and the player with the higher scores is eliminated.

On the first hole Andy hit it to 20 feet and he almost made the birdie putt which grazed the edge. But the putt skirted 3 feet past, then he lipped out his par putt again and made bogey and trails Julien by one heading to the last hole. On the next hole, a bad drive forced Andy to lay up, but then he stuffed his approach to 8 feet. Julien hit a poor third shot to the rough with a difficult chip, but he hit the chip to within tap-in range. Andy missed the birdie putt and is eliminated.

Hole	17	18	Total
Par	3	5	8
Julien	3	5	8 (IN)
Andy	4	5	9 (OUT)

=== Show 9: You'll Need the Luck of the Irish ===
The immunity challenge for this show is a round-robin format contest in which one player faces the other two players twice each. In one of the times, one player chooses the location for them to play their shots into, while the other time, the other player chooses the shot location. The player who gets the lowest score from that location gets one point. The player who wins the challenge gets $5000 gift certificate to Dick's Sporting Goods and advances to the finals, while the other two players head to the elimination challenge.

Match	Choice	Location	Yardage	Mallory	Julien	Mark
1	Mallory	Fringe	28	3	2	N/A
2	Julien	Bunker	23	2	2	N/A
3	Julien	Fairway	89	N/A	2	3
4	Mark	Fairway	103	N/A	3^{1}	3
5	Mark	N/A	N/A	N/A	N/A	N/A
6	Mallory	N/A	N/A	N/A	N/A	N/A

^1 At this point Julien already has enough points to ensure a win so he wins and the challenge ends

Mallory and Mark heads to the elimination challenge, in which the players play stroke play on Holes 12, 13, 15, and 16 of the Smurfit Course. The player with the higher score in those four holes at the end is eliminated, and the winner advances onto the finals.

Mallory missed a good birdie opportunity on 12 when she missed a 15-foot birdie putt so they are tied after one hole. Then Mark steps up the next hole by sinking a 20-foot birdie putt and took a one-shot lead when Mallory missed her 18 footer. They both par the 15th hole after missing the green. Then on the 16th hole, Mark made a fantastic up-and-down. He drove it into a bad lie in a fairway bunker, and his approach shot nearly went in the water but landed in another bunker. He splashed out to 7 feet and made the clutch par putt to beat Mallory who also had to settle for par after her approach landed 35 feet away.

Hole	12	13	15	16	Total
Par	3	4	4	4	15
Mark	3	3	4	4	14 (IN)
Mallory	3	4	4	4	15 (OUT)

=== Show 10: Pot of Gold ===
The two finalists, Mark and Julien, play in an 18-hole match play final on the K Club Ryder Cup Course.

They halved the first hole when Mark missed the green in two but made a 7 footer to save par. They both hit errant drives on the second hole to halve the hole with bogeys. Then on the third, Mark hit a poor iron shot landing in a tough lie in a bunker, and would make bogey to go 1 down to Julien. They both birdie the 4th hole after reaching greenside bunkers in two and getting up-and-down from there. Then a major turning point came on the 5th hole. Julien hit his drive into the trees and Mark found the fairway. But Julien hit an excellent recovery shot to just short of the green. Mark failed to capitalize his good drive, landing on the green 50 feet short. Julien chipped close enough for a tap-in par, but Mark hit his first putt 7 feet past and missed the par putt and went 2 down after 5 holes.

After halving the 6th hole with pars, Julien hit his drive on 7 into the trees and then his approach landed in the water, allowing Mark to win the hole with a par, but he made a 30-foot birdie putt, winning his first hole of the day. It turned out Mark made a putt at the wrong time, because on the very next hole, Julien made a 30-foot birdie putt, and Mark, who made a long putt on the previous hole even when he didn't need it, missed his 20 footer this time to lose the hole. On the 9th hole, both players were over the green in 2 with a difficult pitch, but Julien hit it to 4 feet and Mark to 8 feet, and they both make their par putts to halve the hole.

The momentum clearly shifted towards Mark on the back nine. On the second shot of the 10th hole, Julien hit his approach 85 yards offline and made bogey from there and lost the hole to Mark. Then on the 11th, Mark hit a poor drive into a bunker but Julien hit in the middle of the fairway. Mark missed the green in 2 and Julien, with a good opportunity to capitalize, hit it into the water but chipped the next one close for a tap-in bogey. Mark, who now has the opportunity to capitalize, hit his chip 8 feet short and missed the par putt to halve the hole. However, Mark continued his momentum when he made a 20-foot birdie putt on 12 to win another hole and square the match. They halved the 13th with two-putt pars from 25 feet, then on the 14th, Mark dropped a huge 45 foot bomb putt to take the lead the first time in the match. Mark won two holes in a row when Julien got in trouble with his approach on the 15th, pitched it to 10 feet and missed his par putt.

It looked like Mark had the win wrapped up, especially when Julien hit a poor drive on 16 and Mark hit a good one. Instead, they made it interesting when Julien hit a good layup and stuffed his approach to 6 feet. Mark also laid up but then he hit his third shot so poorly that it went 20 yards short and into the water. Mark's next shot didn't even come close so he conceded the hole to Julien. Then on the 17th, Julien hit a poor drive into the trees, but hit a good recovery shot to short of the green. He hit a poor chip to 12 feet but sank the clutch par putt to extend the match. On the final hole, it looked like it was over again when Mark hit the fairway and Julien found a bunker, but Mark lost another hole when he found the water on his approach again. Mark hit his next to 15 feet but missed the par putt, and Julien won the hole to square the match after safely making a par.

Hole	1	2	3	4	5	6	7	8	9	10	11	12	13	14	15	16	17	18
Par	4	4	3	5	4	4	4	3	4	5	4	3	4	3	4	5	4	5
Mark	4	5	4	4	5	4	3	3	4	5	5	2	4	2	4	7	4	6
Julien	4	5	3	4	4	4	6	2	4	6	5	3	4	3	5	4	4	5
Status	AS	AS	J1	J1	J2	J2	J1	J2	J2	J1	J1	AS	AS	M1	M2	M1	M1	AS

With Mark and Julien tied after 18 holes, they head to sudden death playoff by replaying the 18th hole. This time, they both hit the fairway, and Mark goes for the green in two again and this time hits it to 25 feet. Julien went for the green and found the water. Julien did not hit his next shot close, allowing Mark to win with a two-putt to win the Big Break.
