= Steve Duemig =

American sports media personality (1954–2019)

Steve Duemig (November 26, 1954 – May 16, 2019) was an American sports media personality and had a daily local sports talk show on AM 620 WDAE in Tampa since 1996 which has been the #1 rated sports talk show in the area, and worked for AM 910 WFNS for 5 years prior to WDAE. The on-air name given to himself was "The Big Dog." Steve died on May 16, 2019, aged 64, from complications due to brain cancer.

== Athletic career ==
Born in Pensacola, Florida, Duemig moved to Philadelphia where he became a fan of the Philadelphia Eagles, Philadelphia 76ers, and Philadelphia Flyers, and in high school he lettered in soccer, baseball, basketball, and golf. He played soccer for the Lock Haven Bald Eagles but transferred to Bucks County Community College, where he played on the league champion basketball team and the state champion golf team.

After college he began his career in golf, working as a club pro, and qualified for the PGA Tour. He returned to Florida to focus year-round on his golf career, and started a golf business with driving range and golf shop. It was through his golf business that he became connected to Tampa Bay sports radio, eventually discussing other sports on the air. He also played on the first The Big Break that aired on The Golf Channel, and co-hosted the Grey Goose 19th Hole for 5 years with Kelly Tilghman and Charles Davis, provided color commentary during Tampa Bay Lightning hockey games, and hosted College Football Pre-Game React, a weekly call-in sports show on Fox Sports Radio. Through his association with fellow WDAE host Chris Thomas, Duemig became knowledgeable in horse racing and became a part owner of a horse.
