= Aubrey McCormick =

American golfer and entrepreneur

Personal information
- Full name: Aubrey Elizabeth McCormick
- Nationality: United States
- Born: June 24, 1982 (age 44) Orlando, Florida, U.S.
- Height: 6 ft 0 in (1.83 m)

Career
- Sport: Golf
- College: Missouri State University
- Turned professional: 2007

Aubrey Elizabeth McCormick (born June 24, 1982) is an American entrepreneur and former professional golfer.

== Amateur career ==
McCormick began to play golf at the age of 17.

After graduating from Dr. Phillips High School in 2000, she received an invitation to try out for the women's golf team at Daytona State College's by women's golf coach and former LPGA Tour player, Laura Brown. Aubrey was offered a full scholarship. In 2003, after only one year at Daytona State, she was a contributing member of the 2003 NJCAA National Championship Team, was awarded Most Improved Player of the Year and earned an Associate of Arts degree.

After two years, McCormick transferred to Missouri State University. She played at MSU for two years, competing in Missouri Valley Conference women's golf tournaments both years and playing a full tournament schedule. She graduated from MSU with a degree in psychology and interior design.

== Professional career ==
McCormick played professionally for six years. She competed in the LPGA Futures Tour Qualifying School in 2008, 2009, 2010, 2011. McCormick played on the SunCoast Series, Moonlight Golf Tour and the Futures Tour. She placed 12th at the Lincoln Women's Met Open Championship and regional qualifying during the 2009 U.S. Women's Open.

Following her professional golf career, McCormick founded IMPACT360 Sports, a sustainability consulting firm that produced the first Corporate Social Responsibility Report in the history of golf for The Olympic Club. She was invited to the White House to speak at the Sports & Climate Change roundtable under the Obama Administration. She is an entrepreneur and sustainability professional advising companies and individuals in numerous industries.

== Television ==
On March 12, 2012, the Golf Channel announced that McCormick would take part in Big Break Atlantis, season 17 of The Big Break. The reality series took place in Atlantis, Paradise Island, The Bahamas, and featured a skills competition among the all-female cast for various prizes. McCormick placed 5th on the show and was featured on additional programs including the Big Break Academy with Michael Breed, Gone with the Winn, and Morning Drive.
