= Christina Lecuyer =

Canadian-born golfer and television personality

Christina Lecuyer is a Canadian former professional golfer and television personality who provides executive coaching services for leaders, founders and high performers focused on improving enjoyment and financial success.

== Early life ==
Lecuyer was born and raised in Edmonton, Alberta, where she spent much of her childhood immersed in the environment of a local golf course. Though surrounded by golf from a young age, Lecuyer's active participation in the sport did not begin until she was a teenager working at the Derrick Golf and Winter Club. It was there that she developed her skills by participating in competitive money games and observing seasoned players.

== Career ==
=== Golf career ===
Lecuyer began her golf journey competing in Edmonton's amateur circuit, where she achieved significant milestones, including winning the 2002 Women's City Amateur Championship in Edmonton, earning two Club Champion titles, and securing three victories at the Ladies Jazz Pro-Am. Her performance in amateur golf earned her a full scholarship to play collegiate golf for the University of Central Arkansas (UCA).

At UCA, Lecuyer achieved five collegiate tournament victories, 24 top-10 finishes, three All-Conference selections, and two All-American honorable mentions. She was also named a second-team Academic All-American by ESPN The Magazine. In 2005, Lecuyer played a key role in her team's Gulf South Conference championship and qualified for the 2006 NCAA Regionals.

Following her collegiate career, Lecuyer pursued professional golf, competing on mini tours across North America. In the 2008–09 season, she achieved three runner-up finishes on the Cactus Tour, placed third at the Texas Open and fifth at the Michigan Open.

In addition to her competitive career, Lecuyer appeared on several Golf Channel programs, including two seasons of The Big Break, and one season of Shotmakers. She also co-hosted Swing Clinic with Jimmy Hanlin on Fox Sports. On The Big Break, Lecuyer placed 4th in the Ka'anapali season, and she contributed to the girls team's victory in the Dominican Republic season by making the final putt.

=== Coaching ===
Following her television appearances, Lecuyer was frequently invited to play golf at corporate and charity events. These opportunities evolved into speaking arrangements and informal coaching sessions, during which Lecuyer shared advice on business and personal development.

She later established a coaching business focused on helping clients develop clarity and confidence. Her coaching framework, "Decision Faith & Action," is designed to support entrepreneurs, business executives, and athletes in achieving their goals.

Although Lecuyer retired from professional golf, she continues to participate in philanthropic golf events, contributing to various charitable causes.

== Podcast ==
In 2021, Lecuyer launched the Decide It's Your Turn podcast, focusing on topics related to success and personal fulfillment in various aspects of life. The podcast features Lecuyer's perspectives and insights, along with interviews from notable guests such as ten-time Grammy nominee Jamey Johnson, Fox News host Tomi Lahren, and Netflix CMO Bozoma Saint John.
