= Tom Abbott =

British sports commentator

Tom Abbott (born 7 December 1981 in London, England) is a broadcaster and sports commentator, best known for his work with The Golf Channel and NBC. He serves as a presenter and commentator for coverage of the PGA Tour, LPGA Tour, and European Tour. From 2010 to 2015, Abbott was co-host of The Big Break.

== Early life ==
Abbott grew up in Cheam, a suburb of London, England. He attended Wilson's School, an all-boys' school in Wallington, Surrey. During his youth, Abbott was a keen golfer, representing Surrey at Junior and Men's level, and also playing for the England Schools' golf team. He played on the golf team at Mercer University in Macon, Georgia, graduating in 2004 with a degree in Media Business. In October 2015 Abbott was inducted into the Mercer Athletic Hall of Fame.

== Early career ==
Abbott began his broadcasting career at Mercer University, helping to create an on-campus television station, Mercer99. While in Macon, he worked with local ABC affiliate WPGA-TV, appearing weekly on the "58 Sports Show". Abbott was an intern at WGCL-TV in Atlanta, Georgia. His first full-time broadcasting job came in 2004 with the then-brand-new CBS affiliate in Charlottesville, Virginia, WCAV-TV. Abbott was the affiliate's first-ever sports anchor, helping to launch, and appearing on, the inaugural newscast for CBS-19 News in November 2004.

== Golf Channel and NBC Sports ==
Abbott joined Golf Channel in November 2005 as a reporter and presenter for the network's UK Channel, based in Orlando, Florida. He worked on the news show Golf Central, and also hosted LPGA Tour coverage alongside Laura Baugh. The Golf Channel UK went off the air on 31 December 2007 but Abbott was retained by the network to work on its U.S.-based operation.

In January 2008, he began hosting European Tour coverage, as well as reporting and anchoring Golf Central. Abbott also became the voice behind the Top 10 series for one season. In late 2008, Abbott began appearing on the network's LPGA Tour coverage. Abbott has become a well known voice of women's golf and has been a mainstay of LPGA broadcasts.

In 2009, Abbott reported on the announcement of golf's inclusion into the Olympics from Copenhagen, Denmark. Seven years later at the games in Rio, golf returned to The Olympics and Abbott was part of the NBC Sports broadcast team. Abbott was also a part of the NBC Sports golf coverage of Tokyo 2020 and Paris 2024. He traveled to China for the 2022 Winter Olympics, one of only a few on-air talent who reported from the country during the games, those present had to follow strict Covid protocols. Abbott covered Biathlon.

In 2010, Abbott replaced Vince Cellini as host of Golf Channel's hit series, The Big Break. Abbott went-on to host eleven seasons of Big Break, including Big Break NFL, alongside Michele Tafoya, and the last season Big Break, The Palm Beaches, Florida, which aired in early 2015. In June 2015, Golf Channel significantly reduced its original programming division putting The Big Break on-hold, it is unclear if the show will ever return to the network or whether Abbott will continue as host. In 2024, Golf Channel produced Big Break Where Are They Now, which aired on Peacock with Abbott interviewing notable contestants from the show.

In 2012, Abbott made his first appearance on Golf Channel's PGA Tour coverage. A year later, he appeared for the first time as an announcer and interviewer for NBC at the U.S. Women's Open. Two years later, Abbott was part of the BBC commentary team at the Ricoh Women's British Open from Royal Birkdale Golf Club. Later in 2014, he appeared as a tower announcer for NBC's coverage of The Ryder Cup.

In 2015, Abbott called the winning putt for the US in their victory over Europe at the Solheim Cup in Heidelberg, Germany. A few weeks later he was part of the commentary team for Golf Channel & NBC's coverage of the Presidents Cup in Songdo, South Korea, meaning by the age of 33 Abbott had commentated the Ryder, Presidents, Solheim and Walker Cups.

Golf Channel & NBC began a 13-year commitment to broadcast The Open in 2016 and Abbott was part of the commentary team at Royal Troon. Abbott has appeared regularly on NBC Sports coverage of The Open and US Open. He was in the booth for early coverage of the 2024 US Open at Pinehurst.

In 2025, Abbott won an Emmy for being part of the NBC coverage of the Paris 2024 Olympics.

== Personal life ==
Abbott resides in Orlando, Florida. In 2024, he revealed on social media he was in a relationship with Grace Mahony, the pair have been pictured together several times. Mahony is the granddaughter of Watership Down author Richard Adams.
