= Anya Alvarez =

American professional golfer and writer

Anya Sarai Alvarez (born May 3, 1989) is an American professional golfer and writer.

Alvarez is the third daughter of Alex Alvarez and Pamela McMinn. She started playing at the age of five. She has qualified for several national championships, including the U.S. Women's Amateur Public Links, the U.S. Girls' Junior and the PGA's National Junior Championship. As an 11-year-old, she won the New Mexico PGA state tournament in the 13–16 age category. In high school (Tulsa, Oklahoma), she never finished worse than 4th in the state tournament, which she won in her junior year (2nd, 4th, 1st, 2nd). She also played in the 2011 NCAA Women's Division I Golf Championship. She graduated from the University of Washington in March 2011 and turned professional. At the University of Washington, Alvarez holds several records, one of which is the most under par at a tournament (2010 Las Vegas Women's Invitational, where she shot 13 under par (68-66-69) for a 203.

As a professional, Alvarez qualified for the 2011 U.S. Women's Open in her first try, and using a local caddy, made the cut, finishing the tournament with an ever-par round of 71. She also qualified for the LPGA Tour's final stage of the LPGA Qualifying School (Q-School) and now plays on the Symetra Tour.

In 2012, Alvarez qualified for the U.S. Women's Open for the second year in a row, played the Symetra Tour and finished her season with a 64 at the Champions Golf Club, in Daytona Beach, Florida. She has again qualified for Stage III of the Q-School.

In December 2013, with her dad as caddy, Alvarez earned conditional status on the LPGA Tour for the 2014 season by finishing 29th place at the final stage of Q-school. Alvarez had rounds of 73-69-73-71-71.

At the beginning of 2014, Alvarez played the ALPG Tour. In her fourth tournament, the ISPS Handa New Zealand Women's Open, she had the lead going into the last round, with scores of 70 and 66. She finished with a 73 to finish in a tie for third. Her performance qualified her for the 2014 ISPS Handa Women's Australian Open.

Alvarez is an advocate for troubled youth (girls in particular) who have been abused, either physically or sexually. She has been a speaker in several fronts and represented nationwide companies such as Clairbone in a program called "Love is not Abuse". She belongs to several organizations that help children; one of them is KidSafe Foundation.

Apart from golf, Alvarez enjoys writing as a hobby, and freelances for different publications.

While living in Pittsburgh, Pennsylvania, Alvarez was a contestant on Big Break Atlantis, finishing in fifth place.

In 2015, Alvarez left golf for writing. As of the end of 2018, she has written for several worldwide publications, including LPGA, ESPN and public radio. and recently started "Major League Girls" website, a site to promote women's sports.

Alvarez currently lives in New York City.
