= Natalia Ghilzon =

Canadian professional golfer

Personal information
- Full name: Natalia Ghilzon
- Nationality: Canada
- Born: May 18, 1990 (age 36) London, Ontario, Canada
- Height: 5 ft 4 in (1.63 m)

Career
- Sport: Golf
- College: Oakland University
- Turned professional: 2011

Natalia Ghilzon (born May 18, 1990) is a Canadian professional golfer.

== Background and family ==
Ghilzon is the daughter of Jim Ghilzon and Carla Fantazzi. Her father, Jim, is an orthodontist who has a private practice in Windsor, Ontario.

== Golf career ==
Ghilzon started finding interest in the game at the early age of three. By the time she reached age eleven, she started competing in golf tournaments, defeating opponents who were three and four years older. She competed in the CN Canadian Tour event at Ambassador Golf Club on June 17 to June 19, 2013.

== Television ==
Ghilzon was a contestant on the Big Break Atlantis during 2012.

== Personal life ==
She attended Oakland University and graduated with a degree in Exercise Science with a concentration in Health and Nutrition.
