= Zakiya Randall =

American golfer (born 1991)

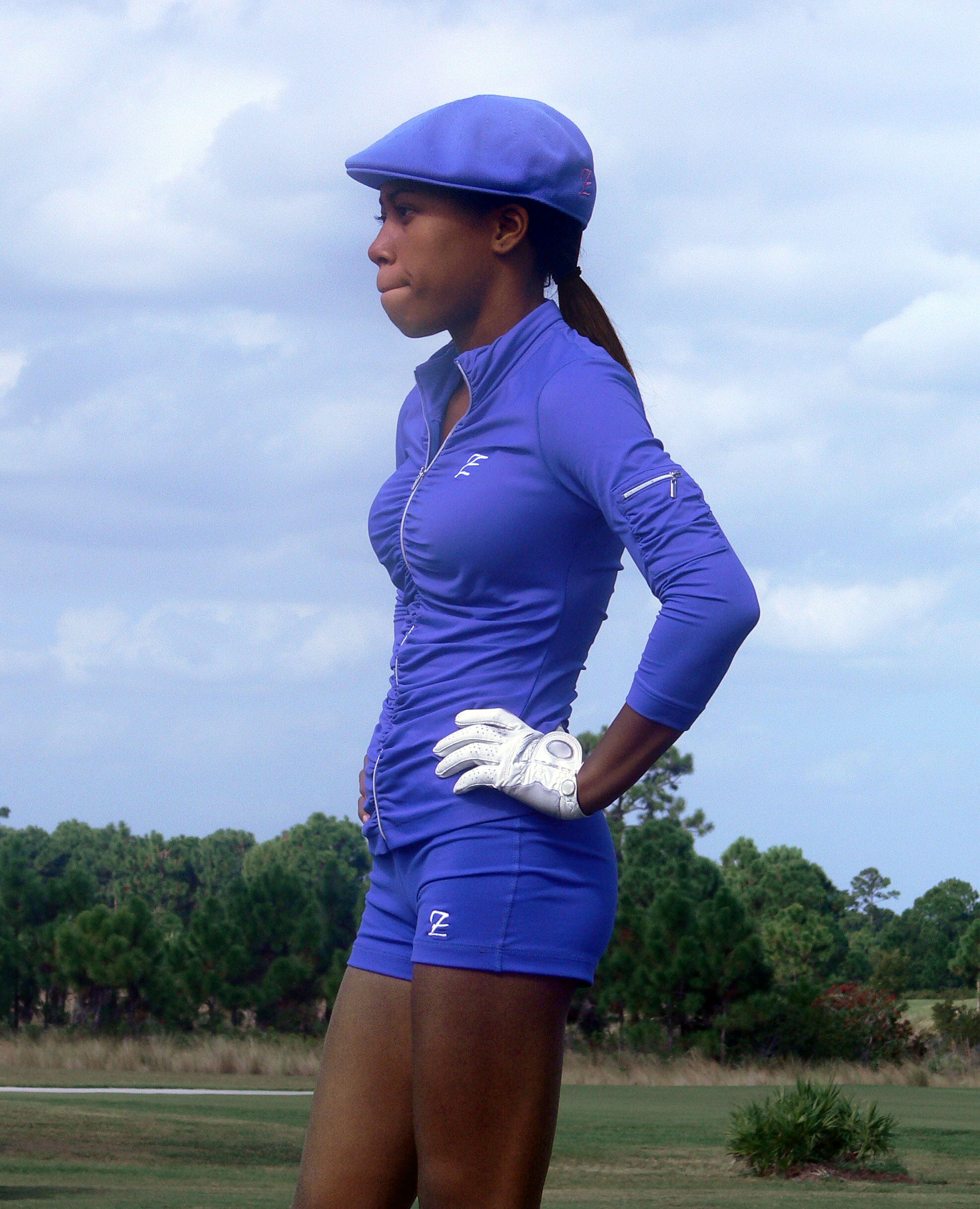
- Randall in 2010

Personal information
- Full name: Zakiya Dara Randall
- Nickname: Z
- Nationality: United States
- Born: May 12, 1991 (age 35) Arlington, Virginia, U.S.

Career
- Sport: Golf

Zakiya Dara Randall (/zəˈkiːjə/; born May 12, 1991) is an American golfer, public speaker, model and music producer, known as 'Z'. Born in Arlington, Virginia, she was raised at an early age in the Washington, D.C. metropolitan area and later as a child moved to Atlanta, Georgia.

== Early life and education ==
Randall was born in Arlington, Virginia, the only child of Donnie Randall, an engineer, and Tanya Randall an information technology consultant. Randall's father is African-American and her mother is of African-American, Native American and Irish descent. She was homeschooled. Randall's interest in sports and music started at an early age. She has been trained in classical piano. By the age of 9, Randall had won the Atlanta Lawn Tennis Association (ALTA) championship event.

Randall was a member of a child entrepreneurs group.

Randall graduated high school in 2009, and subsequently attended the University of Maryland, where she studied computer science.

== Athletic career ==
Her interest in golf began unexpectedly after joining a family friend on the golf course. She began playing golf in 2001, at age 10. In 2002, her first year of playing golf, she won every tournament she entered and won the Atlanta Junior Golf Association (AJGA) Championship, going on to receive "Player of the Year" in the category of Intermediate Girls 12 and Under. At 14, Randall started gaining national and international attention for winning 35 of 36 junior golf tournaments.

In 2005 she won the overall champion title as well as every tournament she entered in her division in the Georgia PGA Junior Tour. In 2006, at age 15, she became the only Atlantan to win a medal and first place in U.S. Women's Open local qualifier. She also was the youngest athlete nominated for Amateur Athlete of the Year at the Atlanta Sports Awards that year.

Randall, at age 17, became the first female player in Georgia to win at the Championship level against an all amateur men field of players on the Golf Channel Tour.

In 2012, Randall was a contestant on the Golf Channel's Big Break Atlantis.
