= Robert Patterson =

Robert or Rob Patterson may refer to:

== Law and politics ==
- Robert Patterson (Alberta politician) (1855–1938), Canadian politician
- Robert Lincoln Patterson (1887–1940), American politician in California
- Robert John Patterson (fl. 1920s), Canadian politician
- Robert P. Patterson Jr. (1923–2015), U.S. federal judge
- Robert H. Patterson Jr. (1927–2012), American attorney

== Military ==
- Robert Patterson (general) (1792–1881), American Civil War general
- Robert Patterson (pioneer) (1753–1827), American revolutionary war soldier
- Robert P. Patterson (1891–1952), United States secretary of war
- Robert Martin Patterson (born 1948), United States Army soldier

== Science and medicine ==
- Robert Patterson (educator) (1743–1824), American mathematician
- Robert Maskell Patterson (1787–1854), American mathematician and chemist
- Robert Patterson (naturalist, born 1802) (1802–1872), Irish naturalist
- Robert Lloyd Patterson (1836–1906), Irish naturalist
- Robert Patterson (naturalist, born 1863) (1863–1931), Irish naturalist

== Others ==
- Robert J. Patterson (restaurateur) (1809–1884), Canadian restaurateur
- Robert W. Patterson (minister) (1814–1894), American Presbyterian minister and theology professor
- Robert Hogarth Patterson (1821–1886), Scottish journalist and author
- Robert C. Patterson (engineer) (1844–1907), Australian railway engineer
- Robert Wilson Patterson Jr. (1850–1910), American newspaper editor and publisher
- Robert James Patterson (1868–1930), Irish Presbyterian minister and temperance activist
- Robert C. Patterson (fl. 1900s), American college football player and coach
- Robert B. Patterson (1921–2017), American white supremacist organizer
- Robert Chandler Patterson (born 1959), American baseball pitcher
- Rob Patterson (born 1970), American guitarist
- Robert J. Patterson (educator), American educator and professor

== See also ==
- Bob Patterson (disambiguation)
- Bobby Patterson (disambiguation)
- Robert Paterson (disambiguation)
- Robert Pattinson (disambiguation)
