= Bobby Patterson =

Bobby Patterson may refer to:

- Bobby Patterson (musician) (born 1944), American musician, singer-songwriter and record producer
- Bobby Patterson (surfer) (born 1935), American surfer

== See also ==
- Robert Patterson
- Bob Patterson (disambiguation)
