= Funnies =

Funnies or The Funnies may refer to:

- Sunday comics, the comic strip section carried in most western newspapers, almost always in color
- The Funnies, a proto-comic book series first published by Dell Publishing in 1929
- Funnies Inc., an American comic book packager of the 1930s to 1940s
- Funnies (golf), terms used in golf to describe unusual events that are used for gambling
- Funnies on Parade, a proto-comic book series published by Eastern Color Printing in 1933
- Famous Funnies, a seminal 1930s American comic book series
- Hobart's Funnies, the specialised tanks of the British 79th Armoured Division
- The Funnies (Monica's Gang), a Mauricio de Sousa's creation related to Monica's Gang
