= The World Atlas of Golf =

Golf reference book

- First UK Edition
- Author: Percy Ainsworth Ward-Thomas, Charles Price
- Language: English
- Genre: Guidebook
- Publication date: 1976

The World Atlas of Golf: The Greatest Courses and How They Are Played is a golf reference book. First released in 1976, it was reprinted in 1988, 1991, 1998, 2003, and 2008.

The book describes 75 course with illustrations, history, architecture, and the special nature of some of the holes. An additional 100 courses are described in the gazetteer section with maps, course cards and commentary.
