= Robert Paterson =

Robert Paterson may refer to:

- Robert Paterson (principal) (died 1717), principal of Marischal College in Aberdeen
- Robert Paterson (stonemason) (1715–1801), Scottish stonemason
- Robert Paterson (bishop) (born 1949), Anglican Bishop of Sodor and Man, Isle of Man
- Robert Paterson (composer) (born 1970), American composer
- Robert Paterson (cricketer) (1916–1980), English cricketer
- Robert Paterson (soccer) (born 1967), former U.S. soccer forward
- Robert Paterson (footballer) (fl. 1896–1900), Scottish footballer
- Robert Paterson (impresario) (1940–1991), English concert promoter and impresario
- Robert Paterson (Scottish architect) (1825–1889), Scottish architect
- Robert Adams Paterson (1829–1904), Scottish golf ball inventor
- Robert Hamilton Paterson (1843–1911), Scottish architect
- Bob Paterson (1875–1960), Australian rules footballer for Geelong
- Bobby Paterson (1927–2011), Scottish footballer
- Bobby Paterson (bass guitarist) (1956–2006), Scottish bass guitarist

== See also ==
- Robert Patterson
- Robert Pattinson (born 1986), English actor
