= Reynolds Yater =

American surfboard builder (born 1932)

- Born: 1932 (age 92–93); Los Angeles, California, USA
- Other names: Renny
- Spouse: Sally Yater (m. 1954; died 2013)
- Children: 3
- Website: Official website

Reynolds Wood "Renny" Yater (born 1932 in Los Angeles) is an American surfboard builder. He was one of the first commercial surfboard builders of the 1950s and is best known for his noserider, the Yater Spoon. At that time, it was the thinnest and lightest board available. Prior to opening Yater Surfboards in 1959, he worked with both Hobart Alter and Dale Velzy, two of the pioneering surfboard builders in that era.

== Early life ==
Yater was born in Los Angeles, California in 1932 and grew up in Laguna Beach. His parents renovated houses and they lived in Pasadena for a short time. He spent his last two years of high school at John Muir College and briefly attended Claremont Colleges. He surfed for the first time at age 14 on a "plank" at Doheny State Beach and built his first surfboard in 1953. He also worked as a lifeguard in his late teens.

== Career ==
Yater began working for Hobie Surfboards in 1955, primarily glassing balsa boards. He worked with Bobby Patterson, Jimmy Johnson, and Phil Edwards. He moved to San Clemente in 1957 to work for Dale Velzy, where he learned shaping techniques from Velzy himself. In 1959, he moved to Santa Barbara, due in part to the fishing opportunities there. He opened Yater Surfboards on Anacapa Street and trademarked the brand that fall.

The shop moved to Summerland in 1961, then back to Santa Barbara on State Street in 1964. In 1967, it moved to Gray Avenue before closing entirely in 1971. A retail shop was opened in 1991 at 10 State Street in Santa Barbara with Yater's son Lauran heading the operation. Customers included Joey Cabell, Grubby Clark, Miki Dora, Felipe Pomar, Bob Cooper, Kemp Aaberg, Bruce Brown, and John Severson.

The Yater Spoon, a noserider, was the most popular of his surfboards, as it was the thinnest and lightest surfboard available at the time. It was produced between 1964 and 1968. The other most popular nosedivers were the Nose Specializer and the Pocket Rocket.

Yater worked as a fisherman for 40 years, as it was often more profitable than building surfboards. He variously harvested lobsters, abalones, corbinas, gobies, and rock crabs, depending on the time of year and where he lived. He stopped fishing in the 1990s and sold his last boat, the New Wave, in 1997. Yater had a role in the 1960s surf movies Big Wednesday (1961) and Walk On the Wet Side (1963). In the film Apocalypse Now (1979), Robert Duvall wears a Yater T-shirt and has a Yater Spoon board (an 8'6"), the latter of which is stolen by the patrol boat crew (in a scene that was cut from the original version, but seen in the Apocalypse Now Redux version). Yater was unaware he would be mentioned in the movie until after it came out. Neither of the Spoons in the film are actual Yates surfboards, but rather spruced-up second-hand boards.

Yater also founded and served as the first president of the Santa Barbara Surf Club.

== Personal life ==
Yater met his wife Sally in Laguna Beach in 1953 while she was attending University of Southern California. They married the following year and had two daughters and one son. Sally died in 2013 from cancer.
