= Nassau (bet) =

Type of bet between golfers

The Nassau is a type of wager in golf that is essentially three separate bets. Money is wagered on the best score on each of the front nine (holes 1–9), back nine (holes 10–18), and total 18 holes. The Nassau is one of golf's most classic and best known wagers. It is also known by the size of the bets, e.g. "2-2-2" or "5-5-5", and "Best Nines."

The Nassau bet gets its name from the Nassau Country Club on Long Island, where the format is said to have been invented in 1900 by club captain John B. Coles Tappan. In the 1900s because the players at Nassau CC were much better than the surrounding country clubs and always won matches against the other clubs. In fact, the other clubs would not play Nassau CC because they were tired of losing everything. To encourage future competitions, Nassau CC adopted the Nassau bet.

The Nassau bet is most usually wagered in match play but can also be applied to many other playing or scoring formats. As with any golf game, players of greatly differing abilities can compete with handicaps being used to determine how many strokes one player must give another.

== Nassau press ==
The Nassau press is a side bet, in addition to the original bet, offered during a Nassau match by the side that is losing in an effort to even their money for either the front nine, back nine or overall. If the player who "presses" (offers the press) then beats his opponent over the remaining holes on a given nine or the overall, he wins the press bet. In effect it is a double-or-nothing proposition. When a side/overall is two or more points down in the match, they may request a press. The opposition has the option to accept or reject the press, although it is usually accepted.

The press bet runs for only the remaining holes to be played on either the front nine, back nine holes or overall. In addition, a press on overall (the entire 18 holes) by the losing opponent will continue throughout the match as a new bet even up at the time of the press. Press bets can themselves be pressed if the player falls two points behind on the press bet. The amount of the press bet is the same as the original match bet. For example, in a $2 Nassau, presses are for $2. This is basically a double-or-nothing proposition for the player in the lead.

== See also ==
- Golf glossary
- Funnies (golf)
