= Robert Pattinson (disambiguation) =

Robert Pattinson (born 1986) is an English actor.

Robert Pattinson may also refer to:

- Robert Pattinson (politician), MP for Grantham
- Sir Robert Pattinson Academy, North Hykeham, Lincolnshire, England

== See also ==
- Bob Pattinson (1933–1963), Australian rules footballer
- Robert E. Pattison (1850–1904), governor of Pennsylvania
- Robert Patterson
- Robert Paterson (disambiguation)
