= Robert Lloyd Patterson =

Irish zoologist and linen merchant

Sir Robert Lloyd Patterson (1836–1906) was an Irish naturalist and linen merchant.

== Biography ==
Patterson was the second son of the naturalist Robert Patterson F.R.S.

He wrote several zoological papers in the Irish Naturalist and the Report and Proceedings of the Belfast Natural History and Philosophical Society and a book titled The Birds, Fishes and Cetacea of Belfast Lough (1880).

In August 1902, he was awarded a knighthood for services to the Belfast Chamber of Commerce.

On his death Patterson bequeathed his art collection to the Belfast Corporation. It is now in the Ulster Museum.

== Family ==
Robert Patterson and Robert Lloyd Praeger were his nephews; Rosamond Praeger was his niece.

== Arms ==
Coat of arms of Robert Lloyd Patterson
Notes Confirmed 30 March 1901 by Sir Arthur Vicars, Ulster King of Arms. Crest On a wreath of the colours a pelican in her piety vulning herself Proper gorged with a collar dancettee Azure. Escutcheon Argent on a fess dancettee Azure thre fleurs de lis of the field on a canton Gules a lion rampant reguardant Or. Motto Murus Aeneus Conscientia Saua
