= Bob Cooper (surfer) =

American/Australian Surfer

Personal information
- Born: Sidney Robert Cooper; 5 October 1937 Santa Monica, California, U.S.
- Died: 16 February 2020 (age 82) Noosa Heads, Queensland, Australia

Surfing career
- Sport: Surfing
- Sponsors: Morey Pope
- Major achievements: 1966 ISF World Surfing Champion (men's)

Surfing specifications
- Stance: Regular
- Shaper: Channel Islands Surfboards
- Favourite waves: Rincon (USA) and Coffs Harbour (Australia)
- Favourite maneuvers: Hang Ten and Trim

Sidney Robert "Bob" Cooper (5 October 1937 – 16 February 2020) was an American and Australian surfer, shaper, surf shop owner and surf commentator. He was regarded as being one of very few surfers and shapers to be majorly influential in surf history on both sides of the Pacific Ocean.

He began surfing in 1952 at age 15, at Malibu.

His nicknames included the Bearded Bard and the Original Surfing Beatnik.

Cooper died 16 February 2020, aged 82, from cancer-related illnesses near his home at Noosa Heads, Queensland, Australia.

== Surfing career ==
Born in Santa Monica, California, Bob grew up near the beaches there and started surfing at Malibu Beach in 1952.

He also became an early surfboard shaper in California, working for the likes of Dale Velzy, Reynolds Yater, and Tom Morey.

Cooper's signature ‘Bob Cooper Blue Machine’ model produced in 1967 and early 1968 by Morey-Pope Surfboards, was the only board of the era to feature an asymmetrical fin setup.

Cooper was one of the first Americans to travel to Australia, bringing with him USA surfboard-building innovation.

After his first visit to Australia in 1959, Cooper began working with Barry Bennett and Gordon Woods, where he introduced Californian manufacturing techniques. He later worked with Midget Farrelly, Joe Larkin, and many of the major labels in Brookvale, Sydney.

Around 1963., he moved to Queensland where he worked with Bob McTavish, Russell Hughes and Algie Grud at the Hayden Kenny factory on the Sunshine Coast.

At the height of his popularity in California] in 1968, Cooper left America for good, moving permanently to Australia with his new wife.

Cooper went on to become a keen driver of the initial shortboard revolution of the 1970s.

== Surf Films and Features ==
Cooper featured in several surf films of 1960s – 1980s including Slippery When Wet, Surfing Hollow Days, Strictly Hot, Men of Wood & Foam (2016).

Cooper modelled for surf labels such as Morey Pope, O’Neill Wetsuits and Okanui Boardshorts.

Cooper was the first in the surfing industry to promote Indigenous Australian surfers, featuring a few in advertising campaigns of the late 1970s.

== Surf Shops ==
Cooper and his Dutch wife Wilhelmina, whom he met in Australia, opened their first Coopers Surf Shop in 1969 at the Jetty area in Coffs Harbour. At one point this was the biggest surf shop in Australia. Subsequent stores were opened at Coffs Harbour and on the Gold Coast in the 1980s. Cooper sold his businesses in 1993, afterwards retiring to Noosa Heads in Queensland.

Today there are six Coopers Surf Stores around. Cooper continued making custom surfboards for collectors in his retirement from his home at Marcus Beach, Queensland, from 1993 – 2015.

== Religion ==
Cooper was a life-long and sixth-generation member of the Church of Jesus Christ of Latter-day Saints, with his faith being central to his life and teachings. Cooper claimed that it was his religion, not his surfing, that was his bedrock.

Cooper was known for refusing to participate in all surf activities on Sundays. While he entered few surfing competitions, he invariably would pull out before any finals held on Sundays, to the great irritation of officials.

He also refused to open any of his stores on Sundays, and he refused alcohol and tobacco according to his faith.
