= Polara Golf =

US golf equipment manufacturer

Polara
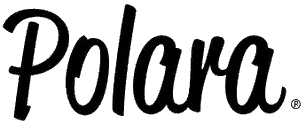
- Product type: Golf balls, clubs
- Country: U.S.
- Previous owners: Aero X-Golf (2005–17)

Polara Golf is a brand of golf equipment, focused on balls and clubs, launched in 1977. Polara-branded products, such as intentionally-asymmetrical balls not approved for official tournaments, have been manufactured by several companies including Aero X-Golf Inc., which filed for chapter 11 bankruptcy protection in 2017.

== Overview ==
Polara's inventors patented their first ball in 1974, starting operations three years later. Nevertheless, the United States Golf Association (USGA) did not approve the ball for use in official tournaments, which caused the company to sue the association. After a 7-year dispute, the USGA agreed to pay US$1.4 million to Polara under the condition the ball was removed from the market.

Officially approved balls are designed symmetrical. This symmetry is the result of a dispute that stemmed from the original Polara, that had six rows of normal dimples on its equator but very shallow dimples elsewhere. This asymmetrical design helped the ball self-adjust its spin-axis during the flight. Over 300,000 balls were sold. The United States Golf Association refused to approve it for tournament play and, in 1981, changed the rules to ban aerodynamic asymmetrical balls. Polara's producer sued the USGA and the association paid US$1.375 million in a 1985 out-of-court settlement.

Market research performed by Golf Datatech found that roughly 28% of frequent golfers would be interested in playing a ball with benefits, even if it was nonconforming. According to Gary De Bay, Polara Golf CEO, about 40% of golfers who tried the ball at a demo day said they would buy it. An article in The New York Times in May 2011 sparked a media blitz, including a segment on CNBC. The great demand "crashed Polara Golf’s computer servers for hours." There was backlash against the "illegal" ball. Ken Hambleton backtracked after interviewing Felker, writing "The problem with the latest version of Polara... is that it works."

In January 2012, Polara announced its new XD and XDS balls, which have higher ball flight and extra distance.

== Products ==
Polara XDS self-correcting golf ball, introduced in 2012.

The Polara Ultimate Straight and Polara Ultimate Straight XS golf balls featuring "self-correcting technology" that reduces hooks and slices by up to 75%. David L. Felker, the CEO and Head of Technology of Aero-X Golf, co-invented the Polara Ultimate Straight golf balls with Douglas C. Winfield. The newer Polara Ultimate Straight golf ball was released in August 2010, and represents a large performance improvement over the original Polara golf ball, which was first sold in 1977. The ball has shallow truncated dimples around its equator and has deep spherical and small spherical dimples on each of the ball's poles.

In January 2012, Polara added two additional products to its line of self-correcting golf balls: Polara XD and Polara XDS. "XD" stands for "Extra Distance" and "XDS" stands for "Extra Distance and Spin". The "Ultimate Straight" Polara golf balls are designed for the golfer whose primary need is slice or hook correction. The "XD" and "XDS" correct only 50%, as opposed to 75% correction for the "Ultimate Straight", but have a slightly higher trajectory, which for many golfers will provide additional distance.
