= Slope rating =

Relative measure of golf course difficulty

The slope rating of a golf course is a measure of its relative difficulty for a bogey golfer compared to a scratch golfer. It is used by handicapping systems to equalize the field by accounting for the likelihood that, when playing on more difficult courses, higher handicap players' scores will rise more quickly than their handicaps would otherwise predict. The term was invented by the United States Golf Association.

== History of slope rating ==
With the aim of developing their handicap system in order to account for variances in golf course playing difficulty for golfers of different abilities, in 1979 the USGA setup the Handicap Research Team (HRT). Two years earlier, in 1977, then Lt. Commander Dean Knuth, a graduate student at the Naval Postgraduate School, had devised improvements to the course rating system, including weighted ratings of ten characteristics for each hole, to provide an adjustment to the distance rating for the course. It was to be the basis for the present USGA Course Rating System. Later, while living in Norfolk, Virginia, he developed a method for Bogey Rating by analyzing data gathered from average ability volunteers scores played on the local courses. Knuth went on to serve as the USGA's Senior Director of Handicapping for 16 years, beginning in 1981.

The result of the Knuth's and HRT's work was a calculation based on the difference between the course rating and bogey rating to give a numerical measure of the difference in difficulty for the scratch and bogey golfer that could be used to adjust golfer's handicaps dependent on the course being played. This remains the basis of what is now called the slope system. In 1982, the Colorado Golf Association rated all of its courses using the new procedure, under the leadership of HRT member Dr. Byron Williamson. In 1983, Colorado tested the Slope System with positive results. Five other states joined Colorado in the test during 1984, before the slope system began being implemented nationally from 1987. Since January 1, 1990, every golf association in the United States that rates golf courses uses the USGA Course Rating System.

The USGA Course and Slope Rating System forms the basis for many of the world's foremost handicapping systems, including the World Handicap System, jointly developed by the USGA and The R&A, that was introduced globally in 2020.

== USGA Slope Rating ==
The USGA Slope Rating is a numerical value that indicates the relative difficulty of a set of tees on a golf course for a bogey golfer in comparison to a scratch golfer. It describes the fact that when playing on a more difficult course, the scores of higher-handicapped players will rise more quickly than those of lower handicapped golfers. The slope rating of a set of tees predicts the straight-line rise in anticipated score versus USGA course handicap, as in the mathematical slope of a graph.

Slope ratings are calculated as a multiple of the difference between the expected good score for a bogey golfer (handicap in the range 20 to 24), called the bogey rating, and the expected good score for a scratch golfer (zero handicap), called the USGA Course Rating. The course and bogey ratings are determined by course raters, who measure and record more than 460 variables on a standard course rating form for each set of tees. Slope ratings are in the range from 55 to 155, with a course of standard playing difficulty having a rating of 113. The higher the slope rating, the more difficult the course will play for a bogey golfer.

In order to calculate the slope rating, the difference between the bogey and scratch rating is multiplied by 5.381 for men and 4.240 for women.

$$\mbox{Slope Rating (men)} : \mbox{5.381} \times (\mbox{Bogey Rating} - \mbox{USGA Course Rating})$$

$$\mbox{Slope Rating (women)} : \mbox{4.24} \times (\mbox{Bogey Rating} - \mbox{USGA Course Rating})$$
