= Bob Patterson =

Bob Patterson may refer to:

- Bob Patterson (TV series), American television sitcom
- Bob Patterson (baseball) (born 1959), American baseball player
- Bob Patterson (basketball) (1932–2018), American basketball player

== See also ==
- Bobby Patterson (disambiguation)
- Robert Patterson
