= Glossary of golf =

The following is a glossary of the terminology currently used in the sport of golf. Where words in a sentence are also defined elsewhere in this article, they appear in italics. Old names for clubs can be found at Obsolete golf clubs.

== 0–9 ==
19th hole

The clubhouse bar.

== A ==
ace

address
The act of taking a stance and placing the club-head behind the golf ball. If the ball moves once a player has addressed the ball, there is a one-stroke penalty, unless it is clear that the actions of the player did not cause the ball to move on purpose. If the player addresses the ball and places the head of the club behind it and in doing so causes the ball to move, a one-stroke penalty does not occur in this case.
aggregate
A score made over more than one round of play, or by two or more players playing as partners.
aim
Generally, the direction in which the golfer's target lies and the direction he or she intends for the ball to travel.
air shot
A shot where the player addresses the golf ball, swings, and completely misses the ball. An air shot is counted as a stroke. See also whiff.
albatross

alignment
The position of a player's body relative to the target line of the ball.
all square (AS)
In match play, a match is said to be "all square" (tied) when both players or teams have won the same number of holes.
Ambrose

A system of team play whereby each player takes a tee shot, after which the most favorable ball position is chosen. All the team's players then take a shot from this new position, and so on.
angle of approach
The angle at which the club head strikes the ball. This affects the trajectory the ball will travel and spin.
approach shot
A shot intended to land the ball on the green.
apron

The grass surface immediately in front of the green that separates it from the surrounding fairway.
artisan
A class of membership of a golf club with restricted rights at a low cost. Historically, many British golf clubs had small artisan sections drawn from the working classes. Typically artisan members had limited playing rights, could not enter the clubhouse, had no vote on the management of the club, played in separate competitions from the main membership, and had to perform unpaid maintenance of the course. Often an artisan club was a separate organisation that had negotiated the use of a course with a private members' club. Some artisan organisations have survived to this day.
attend (the flag-stick)
When a player holds and removes the flag-stick for another player.
away
Describing the golfer whose ball is farthest from the hole. The player who is away always plays first.

== B ==
back nine
The last nine holes of an 18-hole golf course. Playing the back nine is called "heading in".
backspin
A backward spin that occurs when a player strikes the golf ball. The spin causes the ball to stop quickly or spin backward after landing on the green.
back-swing
The first part of the golf swing. The back-swing starts with the club-head immediately behind the ball and ends when the club head travels back behind the player's head. The term take-away refers to the first part of the back-swing.

Bag
Ball
A small sphere used in playing golf, which is intended to be struck by a player swinging a club. Balls are usually white, covered in dimples, and made of a variety of materials.
Ball-marker
A token or a small coin used to spot the ball's position on the green prior to lifting it.
Ball retriever
Ballstriking
the combination of a golfer's driving and approach play (i.e. long game), as opposed to short game
Ball washer
A device found on many tees for cleaning golf balls.
Banana-ball
The result of a severe slice that results in a trajectory in the shape of a banana. This is also referred to as an extreme slice.
Bandit
See Sandbagger.
Bare lie
When the ball lies directly on hard ground without any grass to buoy the ball up, (i.e.), where there is no grass creating a gap between the ball and the ground. Applicable when practicing off hard mats.
Best ball
A form of team play using two-, three-, or four-person teams. The team score on each hole is the lowest score obtained by one of the team members. For example, if player A has a 5, player B has a 6, player C has a 4, and player D has a 5, the "best ball" and team score is a 4.
Biarritz
A hole whose green incorporates a deep gulley that effectively splits the putting surface in two. Named after a famous example at "Le Phare Golf Club" in Biarritz, France. This original par-3 3d hole by the ocean is long built over.
Bifurcation
A proposal under consideration since the late 2010s by the sport's rulemaking bodies, The R&A and the USGA, to create separate rules for competitive and recreational play, mostly but not entirely relating to allowed equipment.
BIGGA
Is the professional association in the United Kingdom dealing with all matters of golf management from a greens-keeper's viewpoint. For the U.S. equivalent, see GCSAA.
Birdie
A hole played in one stroke under par.
Bisque
A form of handicapping used in private match play games. The higher handicapped player is allowed to choose on which holes they receive their handicap allowance of "free shots". As this is a matter of negotiation between the players involved there are many variations in the number of shots allowed and when (before the start of the round, before playing a hole, during the play of a hole, after playing a hole) the claiming of "free shot" is allowed. Bisque matches are not recognized by the rules of golf.
Bite
Some players put a great deal of spin on their approach shots causing the ball to stop immediately when it hits the green. This phenomenon is referred to as biting or checking. Depending on the amount of backspin, the ball may stop advancing forward and roll back towards the player after landing. The amount of backspin imparted on the ball is greatly influenced by the ball material, quality of contact with the face of the club, and course conditions.

blade
1. A type of iron where the weight is distributed evenly across the back of the club-head as opposed to mainly around the perimeter. See also cavity back.
2. A type of putter with a striking face considerably wider than the distance from the face to the rear of the club-head.
3. A shot struck "thinly" with the bottom of an iron striking high up on the golf ball, causing a low trajectory shot with a lack of control.
blast
A bunker shot that sends the ball, and accompanying sand, (hopefully) onto the green. Also called an explosion.
blind
A shot that does not allow the golfer to see where the ball will land, such as onto an elevated green from below.

Block
A shot played severely to the right; Similar to the push.:
Bogey
A hole played one stroke over par.
Bogey golfer
A player whose handicap is in the range 20 to 24.
Bomb and gouge
A modern golf strategy that involves hitting a long, powerful tee shot ("bomb") followed by an aggressive approach shot to the green ("gouge").
Borrow
See break.
Bounce
The measurement of the angle from the front edge of a club's sole to the point that rests on the ground when addressing the ball. In discussing wedges, bounce describes a sole angle where the back edge of the sole is lower than the front edge, keeping them from digging too deep in sand or being stopped by tall grass.
Bounce Back
Scoring a birdie or better on a hole immediately following a bogey or worse. Also see Reverse bounce back.
Break
The tendency of a putted ball to roll left or right of a straight line. This deviation may be a result of a number of factors or combination of factors including uneven surface, grain of the grass, how firmly the putt is struck or, in extreme circumstances, wind. In the United Kingdom, it is also known as borrow.
Bullarding
Playing consistently above your regular handicap or regularly failing to achieve in competition play. It is the opposite of sandbagging.
Bump and run
A low-trajectory shot that is intended to get the ball rolling along the fairway and up onto the green. Similar to a chip shot, but played from a greater distance.
Bunker
A depression in bare ground that is usually covered with sand. Also called a sand trap. It is considered a hazard under the Rules of Golf.
Bunker, Green-side
A bunker next to or even in a green. See bunker.
Bunker, Fairway
A bunker located on or in the fairway. See bunker.
Bye
A short game played over the remaining holes when the main match finishes early because one player or team has won by a large margin. It serves the joint purpose of adding some competitive meaning to the rest of the holes and also for the losing side to attempt to regain some of the pride lost as a result of their humiliation in the main match. It is usual for the loser of the bye to buy the first drinks in the 19th hole afterwards. In this respect it is an almost direct equivalent to a beer match in cricket.

== C ==
Caddie or Caddy
A person, often paid, who carries a player's clubs and offers advice. Players are responsible for the actions of their caddies. Players cannot receive advice from anyone other than their caddie or partner. A Scots form of the French 'Cadet', meaning an assistant or errand-runner.
Calcutta
A wager, typically in support of one team to win a tournament. In a Calcutta golfers bid, auction style, on the team (or golfer) who they think will win the tournament (you can bid on your own team or yourself). All the money raised through the auction goes into an auction pool. At the end of the tournament, those who bet on the winning team (or golfer) that won the tournament receives a predetermined payout from the auction pool.
Carry
How far the ball travels through the air. Contrasted with run. Typically regards a shot over a hazard. For example, "This shot requires a 200 yard carry to get over that water."
Cart
(i) A four-wheeled electrical or gas-powered vehicle for use in transporting players and their equipment from hole to hole.
(ii) A hand-pulled (2-wheel) or hand-pushed (3-wheel) cart for carrying a bag of clubs, also available in powered versions controlled by remote.
Cart girl
a bartender on the course in a golf cart
Casual water
Any temporary standing water visible after a player has taken their stance. Snow and ice can also be taken as casual water, as well as water that overflows the banks of existing water hazards.
Cavity back
Any iron whose design characteristic is such that the weight is distributed primarily around the outer edges of the club-head in order to maximize forgiveness on off-center hits.
Championship tees
An informal term for the outermost teeing grounds on a golf course, typically providing the longest playing distance and often used for elite or tournament play.
Chip
A short shot (typically played from very close to and around the green), that is intended to travel through the air over a very short distance and roll the remainder of the way to the hole.
Champions Tour
The name used by PGA Tour Champions from 2002 through 2015.
Chunk
A swing that results in the club-head hitting the ground before the ball, resulting in a large chunk of ground being taken as a divot. Also called a fat shot, or "chili-dipping".
Clone
Budget brand golf clubs that look similar to, and emulate the characteristics of, more expensive clubs without breaching any patents.
Closed face
When (in relation to the target-line) the club-face is angled toward the player's body, i.e., angled left for right-handed players.
Closed stance
When a player's front foot is set closer to the target-line. Used to draw the ball or to prevent a slice.
Club
(i) An instrument used by a player to hit a golf ball. A player is allowed to carry up to fourteen (14) clubs during a round of golf.
(ii) An organized group of golfers, usually owning or managing a golf course.
(iii) The entirety of a golf facility, including course, club-house, pro-shop, practice areas etc.
Club-head
The part of a club that is used to strike the ball.
Club-face
The surface of the club-head which is designed to strike the golf ball. Striking the ball with the center of the clubface maximizes distance and accuracy.
Clubhouse
A building on a golf course providing facilities for golfers, typically including changing rooms, bar, restaurant, offices for club officials and noticeboards with information about local rules, the conditions of the course, upcoming events etc. A clubhouse may incorporate a pro shop and dormie house. The clubhouse is normally located adjacent to the first and final holes of the course.

collar
Strip of grass around the green. The grass is slightly higher than on green.
come-backer
A putt required after the previous putt went past the hole.
compress
To hit the ball with a slightly downwards angle of attack of the golf club.
compression
The measurement for expressing the hardness of a golf ball, normally 90 compression. Harder balls (100 compression) are intended for players with faster swings but may also be useful in windy conditions.
condor

A four-under par shot; for example, a hole-in-one on a par 5.
count-back
A method of determining a winner of a competition in the event of a tie. There are several different methods used, but typically the scores in the last nine, last six, last three and final hole are compared in turn until a winner emerges.
course
A designated area of land on which golf is played through a normal succession from hole #1 to the last hole.

Course rating
Course rating is a numerical value given to each set of tees at a golf course to approximate the number of strokes it should take a scratch golfer to complete the course under normal conditions.
Courtesy of the course
The waiver of the green fee. Sometimes extended to visiting golfers playing in official competitions, visiting professional golfers and staff of other golf clubs.
Cross-handed
A putting (and, occasionally, full-swing) grip in which the hands are placed in positions opposite that of the conventional grip. For right-handed golfers, a cross-handed grip would place the left hand below the right. Also known as the "left-hand low" grip, it has been known to help players combat the yips.
Cut
(i) The reduction in the size of the field during a multiple round stroke play tournament. The cut is usually set so that a fixed number of players, plus anyone tied for that place, or anyone within a certain number of strokes of the lead will participate in the subsequent round(s) (typically 65–70 and ties; The Masters is top 50 and ties). Rarely, tournaments may have more than one cut with players missing the secondary cut commonly designated as "made cut, did not finish", or "MDF".
(ii) A shot similar to a fade, a cut curves from left to right (for a right-handed player), but is generally higher in trajectory.

== D ==
dead
TV-broadcaster slang for a shot in which there is no favorable outcome possible.
dimples
The round indentations on a golf ball cover which are scientifically designed to enable the ball to make a steady and true flight. Dimples, by reducing drag, allow a golf ball to stay in the air for a longer flight than would be possible with a smooth ball.
divot
1. The chunk of grass and earth displaced during a stroke.
2. The indentation on the green caused by the ball on an approach shot; more properly called a pitch mark or ball mark.
dogleg
A hole where the fairway is straight for some distance and then bends to the left or right. These holes are so-named because they resemble the shape of a dog's leg.
dog licence
A match play contest ending with the winner winning by seven holes, with six remaining (known as 7 and 6), after 12 holes in an 18-hole match or 30 holes in a 36-hole match. Named because the cost of a dog license in the United Kingdom before decimalisation in 1971 was seven shillings and sixpence (written 7/6, 37½p in new money), commonly known as seven and six.
dormie
dormy
A situation in match play when a player or team leads by as many holes as there are holes left to play. For example, four up with four holes to play is called "dormie-four".
dormie house
A building at a golf club providing overnight accommodation.
double bogey
A hole played two strokes over par.
double cross
A shot whereby a player intends for a fade and hits a hook, or conversely, intends to play a draw and hits a slice. So called because the player has aimed left (in the case of a slice) and compounds this with hitting a hook, which moves left as well.
double eagle

A hole played three strokes under par.
downswing
A motion involving the body and golf club used to move the club from the top of the swing to the point of impact.
draw
A shot that, for a right-handed golfer, curves to the left; often played intentionally by skilled golfers. An overdone draw usually becomes a hook.
drive
The first shot of each hole, made from an area called the tee box, usually done with a driver (a type of golf club).
duck-hook
A severe low hook that barely gets airborne.
duff

A horrible shot. Typically, this is a shot where very little or no contact is made between the club-face and golf-ball.

== E ==
eagle
A hole played in two strokes under par.
Epson Tour

The current sponsored name for the official developmental tour for the LPGA Tour.
even
Having a score equal to that of par.
explosion
A bunker shot that sends the ball, and accompanying sand, (hopefully) onto the green. Also known as a blast.
European Tour

One of the world's leading professional golf tours, along with the PGA Tour. Based in Europe, but also co-sanctions the major championships in the United States, along with many other tournaments in Asia, Africa and Australia.

== F ==
fade
A shot that, for a right-handed golfer, curves slightly to the right, and is often played intentionally by skilled golfers. An overdone fade will appear similar to a slice.
fairway

The area of the course between the tee and the green that is well-maintained allowing a good lie for the ball.
fairway hit (FH)
A fairway is considered hit if any part of the ball is touching the fairway surface after the tee shot on a par 4 or 5. Fairways hit percentage is used a measure of driving accuracy.
fairway markers
Fairway markers indicate the distance from the marker to the center of the green. Some fairway markers give the yardage. Most are color-coded as follows: yellow=250 yards, blue=200 yards, white=150 yards, red=100 yards (or meters). These colors are not standardized and may vary based on the specific course layout.
fat
A stroke in which the club makes contact with the turf long before the ball, resulting in a poor contact and significant loss of distance.
ferret
Hole out from outside the green.
first cut
The rough of the shortest length, adjacent to the fairway.
flag-stick
A tall marker, often a metal pole with a flag at the top, used to indicate the position of the hole on a green. Also called the pin. An additional smaller flag, or other marker, is sometimes positioned on the flag-stick to indicate the location of the hole (front, middle, or back) on the green. Prior to 2019 putts on the green in professional play were required to have the flagstick out or a player was penalized. Though since 2019 putts on the green in professional play with the flagstick in are optionally allowed.
flier
A type of lie where the ball is in the rough and grass is likely to become trapped between the ball and the club-face at the moment of impact. Flier lies often result in "flier shots", which have little or no spin (due to the blades of grass blocking the grooves on the club-face) and travel much farther than intended.

Flop shot
A short shot, played with an open stance and an open club-face, designed to travel very high in the air and land softly on the green. The flop shot is useful when players do not have "much green to work with", but should only be attempted on the best of lies.
Follow through
The final part of a golf swing, after the ball has been hit.
Fore
A warning shout given when there is a chance that the ball may hit other players or spectators.
Fore caddy
One employed by a golfer or group of golfers to walk ahead of the players in order to spot the fall of their shots and to find their balls. More commonly used in the days of hand-made feathery balls when the cost of replacing a ball would be greater than the fore caddy's fee. Today in professional tournaments, ball spotters are normally placed at each hole for the same purpose.
Four-ball
In match play, a contest between two sides, each consisting of a pair of players, where every individual plays their own ball throughout. On every hole, the lower of the two partner's scores is matched against the lower of the opposition's scores. In stroke-play, a four-ball competition is played between several teams each consisting of 2 players, where for every hole the lower of the two partner's scores counts toward the team's 18 hole total. The term four-ball is an informal reference to any group of 4 players on the course.
Foursomes
In match play, a contest between two sides each consisting of a pair of players, where the 2 partners hit alternate shots on one ball. The first player tees off, the second player hits the second shot, the first player hits the third shot, and so on until the ball is holed. Also partners alternate their tee shots, so that one member of each team will always tee-off on the odd holes and the other will tee off on the even holes. In stroke-play, a foursome competition is played between several teams each consisting of a pair of players, where partners play alternate shots until the SINGLE ball is holed. The term foursome is a common reference to any group of 4 players on the course.
Frenchie
the act of ricocheting a ball off a tree back onto the fairway.
Fringe
Also known as Frog hair or Collar.: Grass area surrounding the green, mowed slightly higher than the green. Collective term of Collar and Apron.
Front nine
Holes 1 through 9 on a golf course.
Funnies
Various informal achievements, both positive and negative; these differ from traditional achievements like birdies or eagles in that the achievements are for unusual things that may happen in the course of a game. Their main use is to add interest to informal match play games as they enable players to win something regardless of the overall outcome of the match. They are frequently associated with gambling because money, usually small stakes, changes hands depending on which funnies occur.

== G ==
Gear effect
The spin imparted on the golf ball from off-center hits on the clubface, particularly with driver, where the clubhead rotates like a gear meshing with the ball. Toe hits produce draw spin and heel hits produce fade spin. The effect also applies to the vertical axis, where strikes high on the clubface produce a higher launch angle and lower spin rate, while strikes low on the clubface produce a lower launch angle and higher spin rate. Club manufacturers design curvature (horizontal "bulge" and vertical "roll") in clubfaces to optimize the gear effect.
Gimme
Refers to a putt that the other players agree can count automatically without actually being played (under the tacit assumption that the putt would not have been missed). "Gimmes" are not allowed by the rules in stroke play, but they are often practiced in casual matches. However, in match play, either player may formally concede a stroke, a hole, or the entire match at any time, and this may not be refused or withdrawn. A player in match play will generally concede a tap-in or other short putt by their opponent.
Golden ferret
Holing out from a (green-side) bunker.
Goldie bounce
When the ball strikes a tree deep in the rough and bounces out onto the fairway.
Golf club
(i) An implement used by a player to hit a golf ball. A player is allowed to carry up to fourteen (14) clubs during a round of golf. (ii) An organized group of golfers, usually owning or managing a golf course. (iii) The entirety of a golf facility, including course, club-house, pro-shop, practice areas etc.
Good-good
When both players in a match agree to concede each other's putts.
Grain
The direction in which the grass grows, specifically on the green (see below). Depending on the variety of grass used on the green and mowing patterns, grain can significantly influence the speed and movement of a putt.
Grand slam
Winning all the golf's major championships in the same calendar year. Before The Masters was founded, the national amateur championships of the U.S and the UK were considered majors along with the two national opens and only Bobby Jones has ever completed a grand slam with these. A "Career Grand Slam" is having won each of the majors at least once, not necessarily in the same year.
Green
The area of specially prepared grass around the hole, where putts are played.
Green fee
The charge made for a round of golf by the course management.
Greensomes
Is a variation of foursomes, where each side consists of 2 players. Both players play one tee-shot each from every tee. A choice is then made as to which is the more favorable of the 2 ball positions, the other ball being picked up. Thereafter the players play alternate shots. So if A's tee-shot is selected, the playing order from the tee will be A-B-A-B etc. until the ball is holed out. If player B's tee-shot is selected, the playing order will be B-A-B-A etc. The team with the lowest score wins the hole.
Green in regulation (GIR)
A green is considered hit "in regulation" if any part of the ball is touching the putting surface while the number of strokes taken is at least two fewer than par (i.e., by the first stroke on a par 3, the second stroke on a par 4, or the third stroke on a par 5).
Gross score
The total number of strokes taken for a hole (or round) before accounting for a golfer's handicap.
Grounding the club
To place the club-face behind the ball on the ground at address. Grounding the club is prohibited in bunkers or when playing from any marked hazard.
Ground under repair (GUR)
An area of the golf course that is being repaired. A free drop is allowed if the ball lands in an area marked "GUR".
Groove
(i) The crevices on the face of a club that are designed to impart spin on the ball.
(ii) A well practiced swing that is easily repeatable by the golfer is often described as "well grooved".

== H ==
hacker
1. A person who demonstrates poor golf etiquette.
2. A golfer lacking skill who often becomes frustrated or quits.
half
In match play, a hole is halved (or tied) when both players or teams have played the same number of strokes. In some team events, such as the Ryder Cup and Presidents Cup (except for singles matches in the latter competition while its overall outcome remains in doubt), a match that is tied after 18 holes is not continued, and is called "halved", with each team receiving half a point.
handicap

A numerical measure of a golfer's potential that is used to enable players of varying abilities to compete against one another.
halfway house
halfway hut
A building, generally between the 9th and 10th holes, providing light snacks and refreshments for golfers during their round.
handsy
A player with too much wrist movement in their golf swing or putting stroke, causing inconsistent shots or putts.
hard-pan
Hard, usually bare, ground conditions. Generally, hard-pan refers to hard, dry clay, with very little or no grass.
hazard

Any bunker or permanent water including any ground marked as part of that water hazard. Special rules apply when playing from a hazard.
heel
The part of the club-head nearest the shaft.
hole
1. A circular hole in the ground which is also called "the cup", 4.25 inches (108 mm) in diameter.
2. Any one of the (usually 9 or 18) geographic sections of a golf course, beginning at a tee area and ending at a green.
hole in one

When a player hits the ball directly from the tee into the hole with one stroke.
hole in one insurance

Many tournaments offer large prizes if a player shoots a hole in one on a particular hole. Indemnity insurance is often purchased to cover the cost should anyone make the hole in one. Hole in one insurance is also available for individuals to cover the cost of a round of drinks in the event of their achieving a hole in one.

Hook
A shot that curves sharply right-to-left for right-handed golfers (or left-to-right for left-handed golfers). Under normal circumstances, a hook is unintentional and caused by a closed clubface; however, good players can use a hook to their advantage in certain situations.
Hooks are often called the "better player's miss", thanks to the fact that many of the game's greatest players (Ben Hogan, for instance) have been plagued by the hook at one time or another in their careers. A shot that follows the same trajectory but to a lesser degree is referred to as a draw. The curved shape ball-flight is the result of sideways spin.
A draw/ hook travels further than a fade/ slice due to the fact that the closed face reduces loft and decreases backspin.
A draw often is considered the "ideal" flight of the ball and implies that the spin is intentional, whereas a hook is an overly spun "draw" which is often a miss or out of control (unintentional).
Hosel
The hollow part of the club-head where the shaft is attached. Hitting the ball off the hosel is known as a shank.
Hybrid
A type of club, increasingly popular in the 21st century, that in the broadest sense combines the mechanics of a long iron with the more forgiving nature and distance of a fairway wood. Most golfers today carry at least one hybrid.

== I ==
immovable obstruction
An obstruction (an artificial item) which cannot be moved without unreasonable effort or without damaging the course or the obstruction. An immovable obstruction is a type of abnormal course condition.
interlocking grip
Grip style where (for right-handed players) the pinkie finger of the right hand is hooked around the index finger of the left.
inward nine
The back nine holes of a golf course, so named because older links courses were designed to come back "in" toward the clubhouse after going "out" on the front nine.
iron

A club with a flat-faced solid metal head generally numbered from 1 to 9 indicating increasing loft.

== J ==
jab
A putting stroke that is short, quick, and, often, erratic.

== K ==
knock-down
A type of shot designed to have a very low trajectory, usually employed to combat strong winds.
Korn Ferry Tour

The current sponsored name for the official developmental tour for the PGA Tour.

== L ==
Lag
(i) A long putt designed to simply get the ball close to the hole.
(ii) During the downswing, how far the club-head "lags" behind the hands prior to release.
Lateral water hazard
A water hazard running broadly parallel to the normal direction that the ball is hit. The edges of lateral water hazards are marked with red stakes.
Lay-up
A stroke deliberately played with a shorter range club than to reach the pin, in order to position the ball in a certain spot. This may be done to ensure a more comfortable next stroke or to avoid a hazard.
Leven
A short par-four golf hole where a bold drive carrying over a bunker or other hazard is rewarded with much simpler approach to the green than one played short or to the side of the hazard. Named after what is now the 16th Hole at Lundin Links, near Leven in Scotland.
Lie
(i) How the ball is resting on the ground, which may add to the difficulty of the next stroke.
(ii) The angle between the center of the shaft and the sole of the club-head.
Line
The path the ball is expected to take following a stroke. This is of particular importance on the green, where stepping on another player's line is considered a breach of etiquette.
Links
A type of golf course, usually located on coastal sand dunes.
Lob
a short, high arc shot, often produced with a lob wedge.
Local rule
An addition to the rules of golf applying to abnormal conditions that may be found on a particular golf course.
Loft
The angle between the club's shaft and the club's face.
Loose impediment
A small natural item which is not fixed or growing, solidly embedded, or stuck to the ball, such as a small stone or leaf. Unless found within a hazard players are generally permitted to move them away, but if the ball is moved while doing so, there is a one-stroke penalty (except in greens, so long as the ball is put back).
LPGA
(i) A U.S.-based organization that operates the world's most significant women's golf tour. From its inception, it has included female club and touring professionals in its membership—unlike men's golf in the U.S., in which club and touring professionals have been represented by different bodies since 1968.
(ii) Any of several other national organizations, modeled after the U.S. LPGA, supporting women's professional golf. These bodies may follow the U.S. model, or may be devoted solely to touring pros.

== M ==
made cut did not finish (MDF)
In some tournaments (previously used by the PGA Tour and The Open Championship), the scoreboard term used for those players who made the cut after the first two rounds, but were subject to a second cut after the third round. Prior to the 2020–21 season the cut line on the PGA Tour was generally the top 70 and ties but if more than 78 players made the cut, the secondary cut again reduced the field to the top 70 and ties. Second cut golfers earn prize money and FedEx Cup points and credit for the finish (i.e. MDF is not tracked like missed cuts, withdrawals, and disqualifications).
major(s)
The most prestigious golf tournaments. In the modern game the Masters Tournament, U.S. Open, The Open Championship and the PGA Championship are considered the men's major golf championships. The Chevron Championship, Women's PGA Championship, U.S. Women's Open, Women's British Open and The Evian Championship are currently considered the women's major golf championships. Historically, from before the dominance of the professional game in the mid 20th century, the British and U.S. Amateur Championships are also often considered men's majors. Sometimes, people refer to The Players Championship as "The Fifth Major".
marker
1. A small metal or plastic disk used to mark the position of a ball on the green if it has been lifted for cleaning etc.
2. A person appointed by the Committee to record a competitor's score in stroke play. They may be a fellow competitor.
mashie niblick
An obsolete name for an iron club with the loft similar to a modern 7 iron. The term became redundant with the introduction of numbered clubs, "matched sets", in the first half of the 20th century.
match play

A form of golf play where players or teams compete against each other on a hole-by-hole basis. The total number of strokes does not determine the winner. Instead, the number of holes won determines the winner. It is possible to win in match-play with more strokes than your opponent.

Medal play
Generally a synonym for stroke play but sometimes used in a more specific sense, referring to the stroke play qualifying rounds preceding a match play stage.
Medalist
The leader in the Medal play qualifying rounds preceding a match play stage.
Member's bounce
Any favorable bounce of the golf ball that improves what initially appeared to be an errant shot.
Mid-amateur
Term used to describe a (usually low handicap) amateur golfer who is over a certain age but is not yet old enough to qualify for the senior ranks (i.e. under 50 or 55 years of age). The minimum age limit for Mid-Am competitions varies widely by country and organisation; for example, the USGA men's and women's mid amateur championships have a minimum age limit of 25, and the English Mid-Amateur (Logan Trophy) run by England Golf has a minimum age limit of 35.
Misread
A misread is to incorrectly discern the correct line of a putt.
Monday qualifier
A stroke play golf tournament held on the Monday before a professional golf tournament that awards top finishers entry into the tournament.
Movable obstruction
An obstruction that can be moved with reasonable effort and without damaging either the course or the obstruction. Obstructions are artificial items such as rakes, towels, or vehicles. A player may move a movable obstruction and if in doing so the ball is moved, it is replaced without penalty. This is different to a loose impediment.

Moving day
The penultimate day of a four-day tournament, usually on a Saturday, so called because it is the day where competitors try to set themselves up for the final push on the final day.
Mud ball
A golf ball that has soil or other debris stuck to it which can affect its flight. Under normal rules of golf one is only allowed to clean a ball in play when it is on the putting green. During exceptional conditions this rule may be waived by a local rule (see Preferred lies).
Mulligan
A do-over, or replay of the shot, without counting the shot as a stroke and without assessing any penalties that might apply. It is not allowed by the rules and not practiced in tournaments, but is common in casual rounds in some countries, especially the United States.

== N ==
Nassau

A type of wager between golfers that is essentially three separate bets. Money is wagered on the best score in the front 9, back 9, and total 18 holes.
net score
The number of strokes taken for a hole (or round) after accounting for a golfer's handicap.
nine-iron
A club of the highest loft in the iron family. Used for short-distance shots.
no card (NC)
no return (NR)
If a player does not turn in a scorecard for a round the player is recorded as "NC" for the round. An exception is if the player is injured and withdraws.

== O ==
on the charge
A player is said to be "on the charge" when stringing together birdies to move into contention during the final round of a stroke play tournament.
open face
When (in relation to the target line) the club-face is angled away from the player's body, i.e. angled right for right-handed players.
open stance
When a player's front foot is drawn backwards further from the target line. Used to fade the ball or to prevent a hook.
outside agent
Any agent not part of the match or, in stroke play, not part of the competitor's side. Referees, markers, observers, and fore-caddies are outside agents. Wind and water are not outside agents.
outward nine
Refers to the first nine holes, so named as links golf courses were set up where the first nine holes went "out" away from the clubhouse.
out-of-bounds (O.B.)
The area designated as being outside the boundaries of the course. When a shot lands "O.B.", the player "loses stroke and distance", meaning that the player must hit another shot from the original spot and is assessed a one-stroke penalty. Out-of-bounds areas are usually indicated by white posts. As an example, if a player's first shot from the tee comes to rest out of bounds, a one stroke penalty is assessed and the player then plays the third shot from the tee.
overlapping grip

== P ==
pace
The speed at which a putt must be struck to get to the hole. Pace and break are the two components of green-reading.
par

Standard score for a hole (defined by its length) or a course (sum of all the holes' pars).

Penal
A type of golf hole design where the player has little choice in the shots required to make par at the hole. Failure to execute these shots successfully is punished by severe hazards. Compare with Strategic.
Penalty area
The official term used by the Rules of Golf since their 2019 revision to refer to what was once known as a water hazard. Penalty areas are subdivided into yellow and red penalty areas, each demarcated by correspondingly colored lines and/or stakes. The type of penalty area determines how one is permitted to take relief when their ball comes to rest within them. Unlike the former water hazard, a player is now permitted to ground their club when playing a stroke from a penalty area.
Perfect round
Having scored a birdie or better on all 18 holes of a round.
PGA
Any Professional Golfers' Association, for example the Professional Golfers' Association of America.
PGA Tour
The organizer of the main male professional golf tours in the United States and North America.
PGA Tour Champions
A tour for male golfers age 50 and over, held mostly in the U.S., operated by the PGA Tour.

pin
Slang for flag-stick.

Pick Up
When the golf ball is picked up before finishing the hole.
Pin-high
Refers to a ball on the green that is positioned along an imaginary horizontal line through the hole and across the width of the green.
Pitch
A short shot (typically from within 50 yards or meters), usually played with a higher lofted club and made using a less than full swing, that is intended to flight the ball toward a target (usually the hole) with greater accuracy than a full iron shot.
Pitch mark
A divot on the green caused when a ball lands. Players must repair their pitch marks, usually with a tee or a divot tool.
Play through
Permission granted by a slow-moving group of players to a faster-moving group of players to pass them on the course.
Plugged lie
A bad lie where the ball is at least half-buried. Also known as a "buried lie" or in a bunker a "fried egg".
Plus handicap
A golf handicap less than zero. A 'plus' handicap golfer must add their handicap to their score.
Pop-up
A poor tee shot where the top of the club-head strikes under the ball, causing it to go straight up in the air. In addition to being bad shots, pop-ups frequently leave white scuff-marks on the top of the club-head, or dents in persimmon clubs. Also known as "sky shots".
Power transfer ratio
Ratio of ball speed divided by swing speed.
Preferred lies
A Local rule that allows the ball in play to be lifted, cleaned and moved on the fairway during adverse course conditions.
Pre-shot routine
The steps an experienced player goes through to get ready for their shot. It usually involves taking practice swings and visualizing the intended shot.
Pro (Professional)
A golfer or person who plays or teaches golf for financial reward. They may work as a touring pro in professional competitions or as a teaching pro (Also called a club pro).
Pro shop
A shop at a golf club, run by the club professional, where golf equipment can be purchased.
Provisional Ball (Rule 18.3)
"The provisional ball Rule is one of the most useful Rules in the book. If, after playing a shot, you think your ball may be lost outside of a penalty area or out of bounds, you should play a provisional ball. The purpose of the Rule is to save time, hence the best time to play a provisional ball is before you go forward to search for the original ball, especially if it is some 200-250 yards away."

Pull
A pull is a shot that unintentionally travels on a trajectory on the same side of the ball from which the player swings.
Punch shot
A shot played with a very low trajectory, usually to avoid interference from tree branches when a player is hitting from the woods. Similar to the knock-down, it can also be used to avoid high winds. Also known as a stinger. Depending on the angle of attack upon impact, stingers can stay low or climb later in the ball flight due to the backspin caused by a steep angle of attack, typically with a low-lofted club.
Push
A push, or block, is shot that unintentionally travels on a trajectory opposite the side of the ball from which the player swings.
In match play, the term "push" can also refer to when neither competitor wins the hole, though this is more commonly called a half.
Putt
A shot played on the green, usually with a putter.
Putting green
A practice green is a putting surface usually found close to the club house, used to warm up and practice putting.
Putter
A special golf club with a very low loft that makes the ball roll along the green with top-spin.

== Q ==
Q-school
qualifying school

The qualifying tournament on several major professional tours, such as the PGA Tour, European Tour, or LPGA Tour. Q-School is a multistage tournament (four for the PGA Tour, three for the European Tour, two for the LPGA) that culminates in a week-long tournament in which a specified number of top finishers (25 plus ties in the PGA Tour, 30 plus ties in the European Tour, and exactly 20 in the LPGA) earn their "Tour Cards", qualifying them for the following year's tour. The final tournament is six rounds (108 holes) for men and five rounds (90 holes) for women. The 2012 Q-school for the 2013 PGA Tour season was the last one, as the rules of qualification for a "tour card" have been changed to eliminate Q-school.

== R ==
The R&A
Since 2004 the governing body of golf throughout the world except the United States and Mexico, where this responsibility rests with the United States Golf Association (USGA). It works in collaboration with national amateur and professional golf organizations in over 110 countries. The R&A is a separate organisation from The Royal and Ancient Golf Club of St Andrews which formerly performed this role.
Range finder
A measuring device used to determine one's relative distance to an object. In golf, they are most commonly used to find out how far a player is from the hole.
Ready golf
When each player takes their shot when ready to do so instead of adhering to the rule order of farthest from the hole playing first; typically done to improve pace of play in a recreational setting.
Redan
A hole that has a green which slopes downward and away from the point of entrance, typically the front right portion of the green, inspired by the original Redan hole on the North Berwick West Links, Scotland.
Regulation
The standard number of strokes allowed by par for reaching the green on a given hole (one stroke on a par 3, two strokes on a par 4, and three strokes on a par 5)
Release
(i) The point in the downswing at which the wrists uncock. A late release (creating lag) is one of the keys to a powerful swing.
(ii) The forward motion of a ball played onto a green after the braking effects of backspin have ceased.
Reverse bounce back
Scoring a bogey or worse on a hole immediately following a birdie or better. See also bounce back.
Rough
The grass that borders the fairway, usually taller and coarser than the fairway.
Rowan match play
A form of individual match play which can be played by three or more players.
Rub of the green
(i) In the pre-2019 rules, a rule that said to play the ball where it lies, even if interference occurred. Commonly applied if the ball was deflected or stopped by a third party (such as a spectator) or a stray object. (ii) Luck in general on the golf course, usually bad luck.
Run
The distance a ball travels once it lands. The two distances of a golf shot are first its "carry" and then its "run".
Rutter
A small headed niblick for hitting the ball from a cart track.

== S ==
Sandbagger
A golfer that carries a higher official handicap than their skills indicate, e.g., carries an eight, plays to a two. Sandbaggers usually artificially inflate their handicaps with the intent of winning bets on the course, a practice that most golfers consider cheating. Also known as a bandit.
Sand save
When a player achieves par by getting up and down from a green-side bunker.
Sand trap
See bunker. Golfers with a deep knowledge of the game rarely refer to a bunker as a sand trap.
Sand wedge
A lofted club designed especially for playing out of a bunker. The modern sand wedge was invented by Gene Sarazen. Although sand wedges were designed for bunker shots, they are actually used for all types of shots within 100 yards (90 meters).
Sandy (or Sandie)
A score of par or better that includes a bunker shot. Sandys are counted as points in some social golf games. If a par or better is achieved after hitting two or three bunker shots on the same hole, the terms double sandy or triple sandy are used, respectively. See Funnies.
Scotch foursomes
In scotch foursomes teams of 2 players compete against each other. Players alternate hitting the same ball. The first player tees off, the second player hits the second shot, the first player hits the third shot, and so on until the ball is holed. To this point, the definition of ‘scotch foursomes’ is the same as that of ordinary ‘foursomes’; however, players do not alternate hitting tee shots as they would in foursomes. If Player A teed off on the first hole and Player B holed the final putt, Player B would not tee off at the second, meaning that Player A could, in theory, play every tee shot on the round. The team with the lowest score wins the hole.
Scramble
(i) When a player misses the green in regulation, but still makes par or better on a hole. Scrambling percentage is used a measure of short game proficiency.
(ii) A two or four man format, similar to Best Ball, except in a scramble, each player strikes a shot, the best shot is selected, then all players play from that selected position.
Scratch golfer
A player whose handicap equals zero or lower. This means they can consistently shoot par or better regularly.
Senior
Describes a competition for older golfers, or individuals who play in such competitions. In men's professional golf, the standard lower age limit is 50. Some competitions use 45 (the Legends Tour in women's golf) or 55 (the U.S. Senior Amateur) as the lower limit.
Senior PGA Tour
The original name of the tour now known as PGA Tour Champions; used from 1980 through 2001.
Shamble
A format, similar to a scramble, where every player hits from the tee, the best tee-shot is selected, and each player holes-out from the selected tee-shot.
Shank
A shot in which the golf ball is struck by the hosel of the club and travels a relatively short distance at a severe angle to the target. A golfer who regularly hits the ball out of the hosel is said to be affected by the "shanks".
Shrimp
A severe hook, named because it resembles the shape of a shrimp.
Shotgun start
Shoot your (my) age
A round of 18 holes where a given player has a score equal to, or less than, their own age in years. For example, an eighty-year-old man who scores an 80 has shot his age.
Shoot your (my) temperature
A round of 18 holes where a given player has a score equal to 98 or 99. Usually used derisively.
Short game
Shots that take place on or near the green. Putting, chipping, pitching, and green-side bunker play are all aspects of the short game.
Short side
To hit a shot that misses the green to the same side in which the hole is cut. This typically results in a difficult following shot with very little area on the green to land and stop the ball.
Sit!
Telling the ball to drop softly, and not roll after landing.
Skin
A skins game pits players in a type of match play in which each hole has a set value (usually in money or points). The player who wins the hole is said to win the "skin", and whatever that skin is worth. Skins games may be more dramatic than standard match play if it is agreed by the players that holes are not halved. Then, when any two players tie on a given hole, the value of that hole is carried over and added to the value of the following hole. The more ties, the greater the value of the skin and the bigger the eventual payoff.
Skull
To skull the ball means to contact the ball with the leading edge of the iron, often resulting in a low shot that goes further than expected with little to no spin. A skulled shot is almost always due to a mishit by the golfer. The terms "blade" and "thin" are also used interchangeably with skull.
Slice
A shot that curves sharply left-to-right for right-handed golfers (or right-to-left for left-handed golfers). Under normal circumstances, a slice is unintentional and caused by an open clubface; however, good players can use a slice to their advantage in certain situations. Slices are often the most common miss for below-average players. A shot that follows the same trajectory but to a lesser degree is referred to as a fade. A fade is often intentionally used by above-average players to achieve a certain type of spin. The curved shape of the ball-flight is the result of sideways spin. For that reason a "slice" does not refer to a putt.
Slope rating
Slope Rating is a number, from 55 to 155, used to determine the level of difficulty of a golf course for a bogey golfer. An "average" course has a slope rating of 113.

snap hook
A severe hook that usually goes directly left as well as curving from right to left, for a right-handed golfer. A snap hook is when a severe left to right hook occurs for a left-handed golfer.
snowman
To score an eight on a hole is to score a snowman. So-named because an eight (8) looks similar to the body of a snowman.
society
An organized group of golfers, usually not affiliated with any individual golf course. Members are often drawn from the same workplace, profession, alma mater, or other association.
sole
The bottom or underside of any type of golf club. It is where the club rests on the ground in playing position.
span
Move your marker when in the way of another person's line of putt.
speed
The pace of a putt. Proper 'speed' of a putt will either hole the putt or leave it about 18 inches (46 cm) beyond the cup. Furthermore, the speed of the putt will often determine the amount of curve, or break, in a putt.
sprauchle
Generally, this refers to playing badly. "Sprauchle" is a Scottish term.
spray
To hit the ball with a grossly inconsistent direction, compared to the intended target, in a seemingly random manner.

Stableford
A points based scoring system. The number of strokes taken on each hole relative to par translates into a set number of points, with the winner being the player who accumulates the highest number of points.
Stimpmeter
A device used to measure the speed of putting greens.
Stinger
A low, penetrating shot designed to travel far with reduced spin, making it ideal for windy conditions or when a low ball flight is desired. It's characterized by a low trajectory and a tendency to roll significantly after landing.
Stony
An English golf term dating back to the late 1800s which means, a shot that lands close to the flagstick.
Strategic
A type of golf hole design where the player has a choice of shots that can be played to make par on the hole. Generally the choices that have the least chance of entering a hazard are intended to have the least chance of making par. Compare with Penal.
Stroke Index
A number assigned to each hole, and printed on the score card, to indicate the holes on which handicap strokes should be taken.
Stroke play
Style of scoring in which the player with the fewest strokes wins. Most professional tournaments are stroke play.
Strokes gained
a method of measuring a golfer's performance data, relative to the performance of the field they compete against. Usually separated into four categories (off-the-tee, approach, around-the-green, and putting) or two categories (tee-to-green and putting)
Stymie
To block another player's putting path to the hole with one's own ball. Now an anachronism since the rules of golf permit marking the spot of the ball on the green, thus allowing the other player to putt into the hole without obstruction.
Sunday bag
A small and lightweight golf bag. Traditionally caddies were not available on a Sunday, so the golfer would carry their clubs in such a bag. Now often used to carry a small number of clubs or when travelling to play golf when a full size bag would be unnecessary or inconvenient.
Sunday Stick or Sabbath Stick
A golf club disguised as a walking stick for surreptitious golf on a Sunday in societies with strict observance of the sabbath.
Sweet-spot
The location on the club-face where the optimal ball-striking results are achieved. The closer the ball is struck to the sweet-spot, the higher the power transfer ratio will be. Hitting it in the sweet-spot is also referred to as hitting it in the screws.

swing
The movement a golf player makes with their body and club to hit the ball. A golf swing is made up of a series of complex mechanical body movements. A perfect golf swing is regarded as the "holy grail" of the sport, and there are many approaches as to how to achieve "perfection". Although there is only one "textbook" golf swing, a perfect golf swing is unique to every individual, and, in fact, it is impossible for a human to perfectly duplicate the textbook golf swing.

== T ==
T
An abbreviation on a scoreboard for "Tied", indicating that a player has the same score as another player. A scoreboard showing a T2 for example means that the player is tied for second place with one or more other players.
Tap-in
Often called a "gimme", a tap-in is a ball that has come to rest very close to the hole, leaving only a very short putt to be played. Often, recreational golfers will "concede" tap-ins to each other to save time.
Target-line
The target line is the straight line from the ball to its intended target. It is also extended backward.
Tee
A small peg, usually made of wood or plastic, placed in the ground upon which the golf ball may be placed prior to the first stroke on a hole. May also refer to the teeing ground.
Teeing ground
The area from which you hit your drive or tee shot. The teeing ground for a particular set of tees is two club lengths in depth. The ball must be teed between the markers, called tees, that define the teeing ground's width, and no further back than its depth. Tees are colored, but there is no standard for colors. While color usage varies by course and region, the rearmost and longest teeing grounds are often informally referred to as championship tees, as they are typically used for elite play or tournament competition. No universal standard exists for tee color designations. The "teeing ground" refers to one set of tees. Most courses have at least three sets of tees; some have more than twice that many. The areas where tee markers are placed are called "tee boxes".
Tempo
The smooth change of the speed of a player's swing from first movement, through the ball strike, to the follow-through.
Ten-finger grip
Grip style with all ten fingers on the club. Also known as the baseball grip.
Texas wedge
Using a putter anywhere outside of the green.
Thin shot
Usually, an unintentional, poor shot where the club-head strikes too high on the ball. When taken to an extreme but still at or below the center-line of the ball, it is known "blading" the ball. Sometimes, when the ball is lying a certain way around the green, advanced players will intentionally hit a thin shot to achieve certain results.
Through line
When putting, the imaginary path that a ball would travel on if the putted ball goes past the hole. Usually observed by PGA players and knowledgeable golfers when retrieving or marking a ball around the hole.
Through the green
The entire area of the golf course, except for the teeing ground of the hole being played, the green of the hole being played and all hazards on the course.
Tiger Slam
Winning four consecutive major championships but not in a calendar year. Coined when Tiger Woods won the last three majors in 2000, followed by the 2001 Masters.
Tips
The championship tees on a golf course are known as "the tips".
Toe
The far end of the club-head (farthest from the hosel).
Topped
An errant shot where the club-head strikes on top of the ball, causing the ball to roll or bounce rather than fly.
Tree shot
A bad shot that has hit the trees' leaves, branches, and/or trunk and has resulted in a negative situation, i.e., going out of bounds, into a hazard, or leaving the ball much shorter than anticipated.
Triple bogey
A hole played three strokes over par.
Trolley
A cart designed for transporting a golf bag, complete with clubs and other golf equipment around the golf course.

turkey
Three consecutive birdies during one round of golf.

== U ==
unplayable
A player can declare their ball unplayable at any time when it is in play (other than at a tee), and can drop the ball either within two club-lengths, or further from the hole in line with the hole and its current position, or where they played their last shot. A penalty of one stroke is applied.
up and down
up and in
The situation where a player holes the ball in two strokes starting from off the green. The first stroke, usually a "pitch", a "bunker shot" or a "chip", gets the ball "up" onto the green, and the subsequent putt gets the ball "down" into the hole.
USGA

The governing body of golf for the U.S. and Mexico. Together with The R&A, the USGA produces and interprets the Rules of Golf.
USPGA

The principal organization for golf professionals in the United States. More commonly called the "PGA of America".

== V ==
Vardon grip

A common grip style in which (for right-handed players) the right pinkie finger rests on top of the left index finger. It is named for Harry Vardon, a champion golfer of the early 20th century.
vaulting dormie
A possible occurrence in match play when a player or team converts a lead into a victory without passing through dormie, a guaranteed minimum of a tie at the end of regulation play—for example, converting an 8-hole lead with nine to play into a 9-hole lead with eight to play, or converting a 1-hole lead with two to play into a 2-hole lead with one to play.

== W ==
waggle
A pre-shot routine where a player adjusts their body, the club, and/or practice swings at the ball.
We Are Golf
A coalition formed by the Club Managers Association of America, the Golf Course Superintendents Association of America, the National Golf Course Owners Association, and the PGA of America to highlight the economic and social impacts of the game of golf.
wedge

A type of golf club; a subset of iron designed for short range strokes. Of all the categories of clubs, wedges have faces with the highest degrees of loft.
whiff
An attempt to strike the ball where the player fails to make contact with the ball. A whiff must be counted as a stroke.
winter green
Typically an area of fairway used as a temporary putting green to prevent damage to the normal green during inclement winter weather. On some courses, particularly in Japan, holes are built with two greens with different varieties of grass, one for summer play, the other for winter.
winter rules

wire-to-wire

Leading a tournament after every round (may or may not include ties).
wood

A type of club where the head is generally (except for the club-face) bulbous in shape; so named because the head was originally made of wood, although almost all are now metal. Of all the categories of long hitting clubs, woods have faces with the lowest degrees of loft. Only putters are lower lofted, generally only 2-4 degrees, whereas drivers typically have 8-14 degrees loft.
worm burner
A shot that is hit remarkably low and sometimes hard.

== Y ==
yardage
Distance (in yards) to target
yips
A tendency to twitch during the golf stroke. Some top golfers have had their careers greatly affected or even destroyed by the yips; prominent golfers who battled with the yips for much of their careers include Sam Snead, Ben Hogan, and, more recently, Bernhard Langer.

== Z ==
zinger
A ball hit high and hard close to the leading edge, causing a low flight and a slight vibratory feel.

== See also ==
- Outline of golf
- Glossary of disc golf terms
