= Ball washer =

Equipment for cleaning golf balls

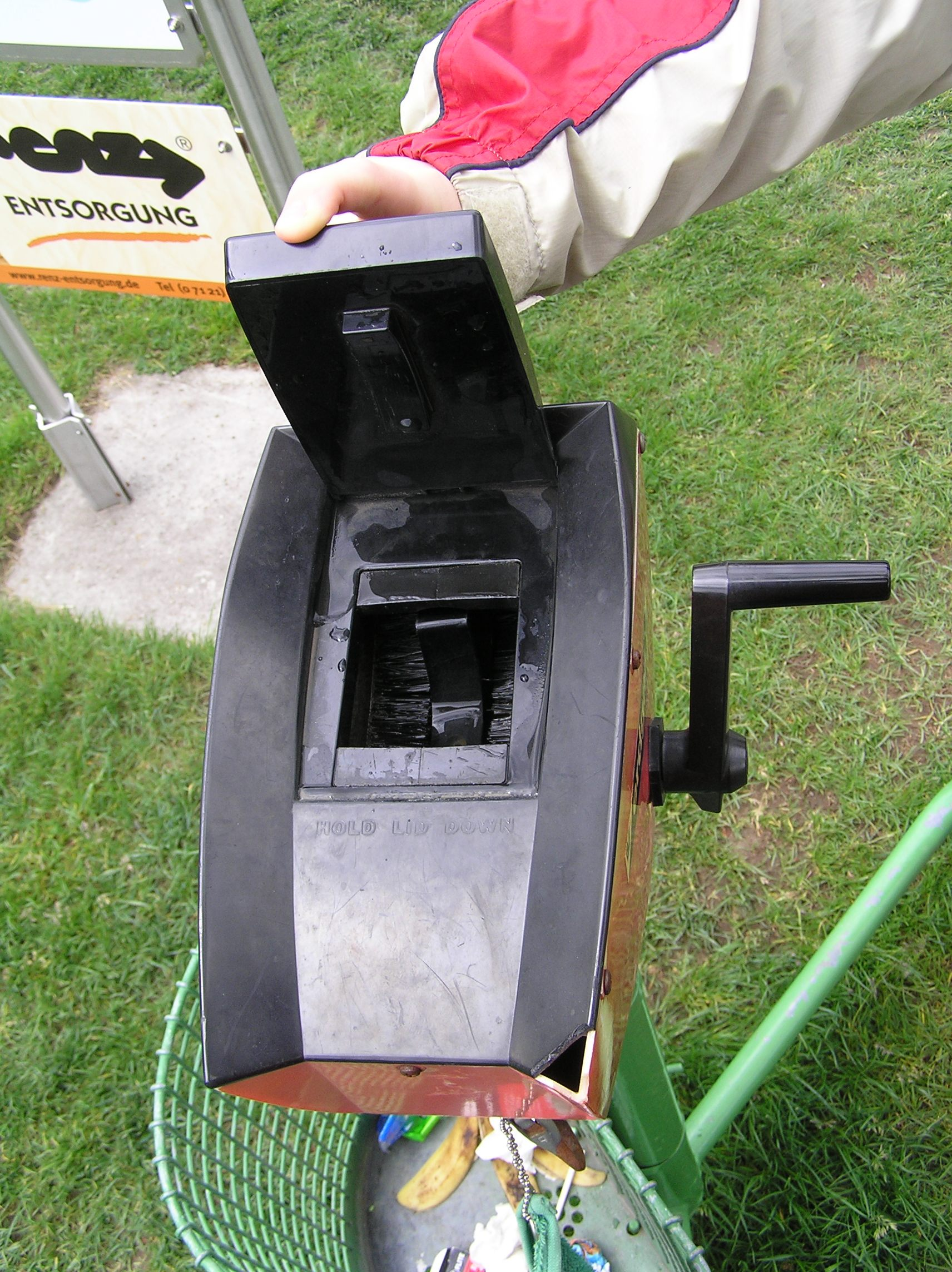
Crank type golf ball washer

A ball washer or ball shagger is a piece of equipment for cleaning dirty golf balls. Because golf balls have a dimpled surface to improve their aerodynamic properties, increasing both distance and control, and are used primarily on grassy surfaces, they tend to collect dirt and grass easily, which can adversely affect their aerodynamic characteristics. Ball washers are typically found on golf courses; on some courses, there is one at every hole. To maintain these aerodynamic properties balls are usually inspected for dirt before play, and washed if required.

Ball washers can be operated either manually or electronically.
