= Rosamond Praeger =

Irish artist, sculptor and writer (1867–1954)

Sophia Rosamund Praeger MBE
- Born: 17 April 1867; Holywood, County Down, Ireland
- Died: 16 April 1954 (aged 86); Rock Cottage, Craigavad, County Down, Northern Ireland, UK
- Resting place: Priory Cemetery, Holywood
- Education: Belfast School of Art; Slade School of Art
- Known for: Sculpture

Sophia Rosamond Praeger, MBE, HRHA, MA (17 April 1867 – 16 April 1954) was an Irish artist, sculptor, illustrator, poet and writer.

== Early life and education ==
Praeger was born in Holywood, County Down, Ireland on 17 April 1867. Her parents were Willem Emil Praeger and Marie Ferrar Patterson. Her grandfather was the naturalist Robert Patterson.

Her father immigrated to Belfast from Holland to work with his uncle in the family linen company, which was established in 1860. Praeger had five brothers, one of whom was the naturalist Robert Lloyd Praeger. Praeger received her primary school education at the day school run by the Non-Subscribing Presbyterian minister, Rev Charles James McAlester. Praeger would later teach at this school. She attended Sullivan Upper School, the Belfast School of Art and the Slade School of Art in London.

At the Belfast School of Art, Praeger studied under the painter George Trobridge, and became a member of the Rambler's Sketching Club in 1886. In 1888, she enrolled in the Slade School, studying under Alphonse Legros and won a silver medal for drawing. Whilst there she became friends with fellow sculptor, Ellen Mary Rope. From 1892 to 1893, Praeger travelled to Paris to study, having been encouraged to do so by Legros and Rope.

== Career ==
Following her time in Paris, Praeger returned to Holywood and established a studio. Having rented a number of studios in Belfast, in 1914 she built St Brigid's Studio on Hibernia Street, which she worked from until her death. Praeger completed her first large commission in 1907, a memorial to T. Hamilton for Queen's University Belfast.

Praeger wrote and illustrated children's books, as well as providing botanical illustrations for her brother's work. However she is best known for her sculptures, working primarily in plaster but also marble, terracotta and stone. Her more well known pieces depict children in what is sometimes described as a sentimental style. Her best known piece, The Philosopher, was first shown at the Royal Academy in London during 1920, subsequently Praeger made several copies for various museums.

Her sculptures also include:

- "Johnny The Jig" in Holywood (between the maypole and the Priory)
- "Fionnuala the Daughter of Lir" at the Causeway School, near Bushmills (1911–17)
- Founders of Riddell Hall, Queen's University Belfast (1926)
- Lord Edward Carson Memorial, St Anne's Cathedral, Belfast (1938)

Praeger also modelled figures for such diverse bodies as the Northern Bank, the Carnegie Library on the Falls Road in Belfast and at St Anne's Church of Ireland Cathedral (Belfast). She was President of the then Ulster Academy, which later became the Royal Ulster Academy.

=== Selected works ===
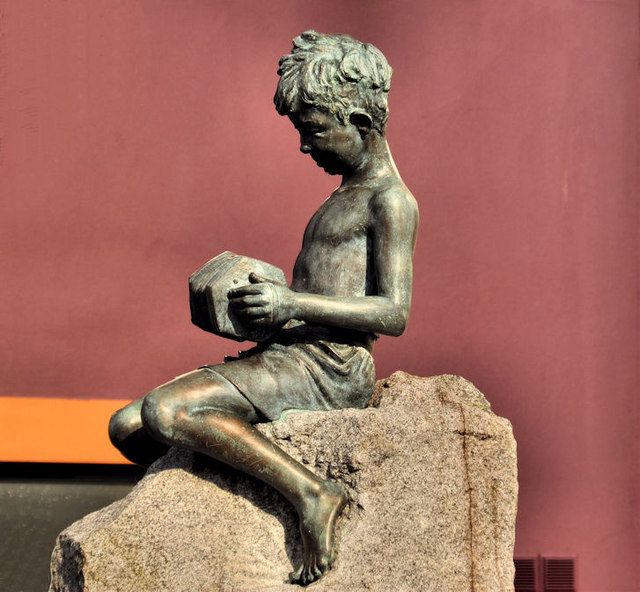
"Johnny The Jig" sculpture in Holywood

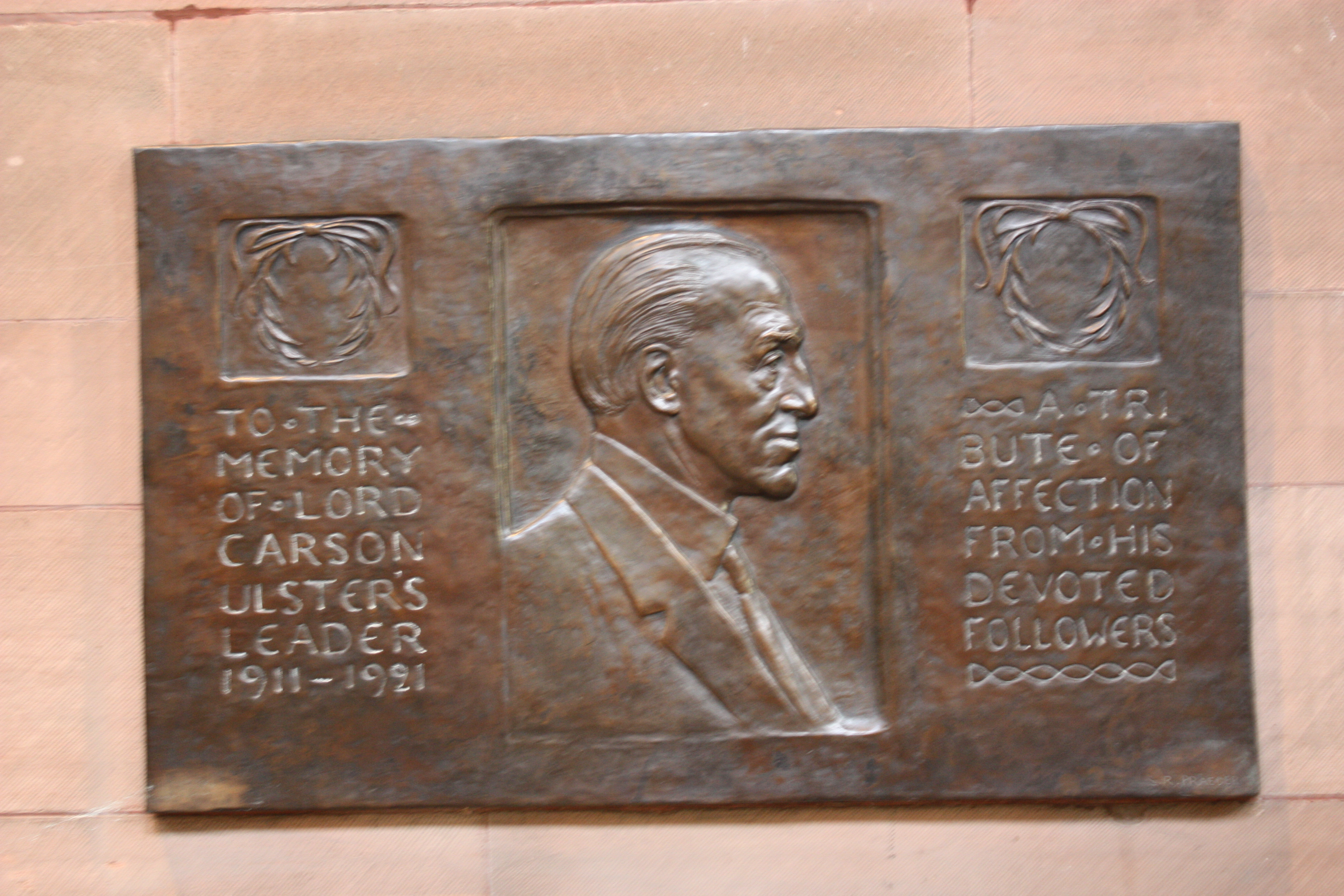
Lord Carson memorial plaque, St Anne's Cathedral, Belfast

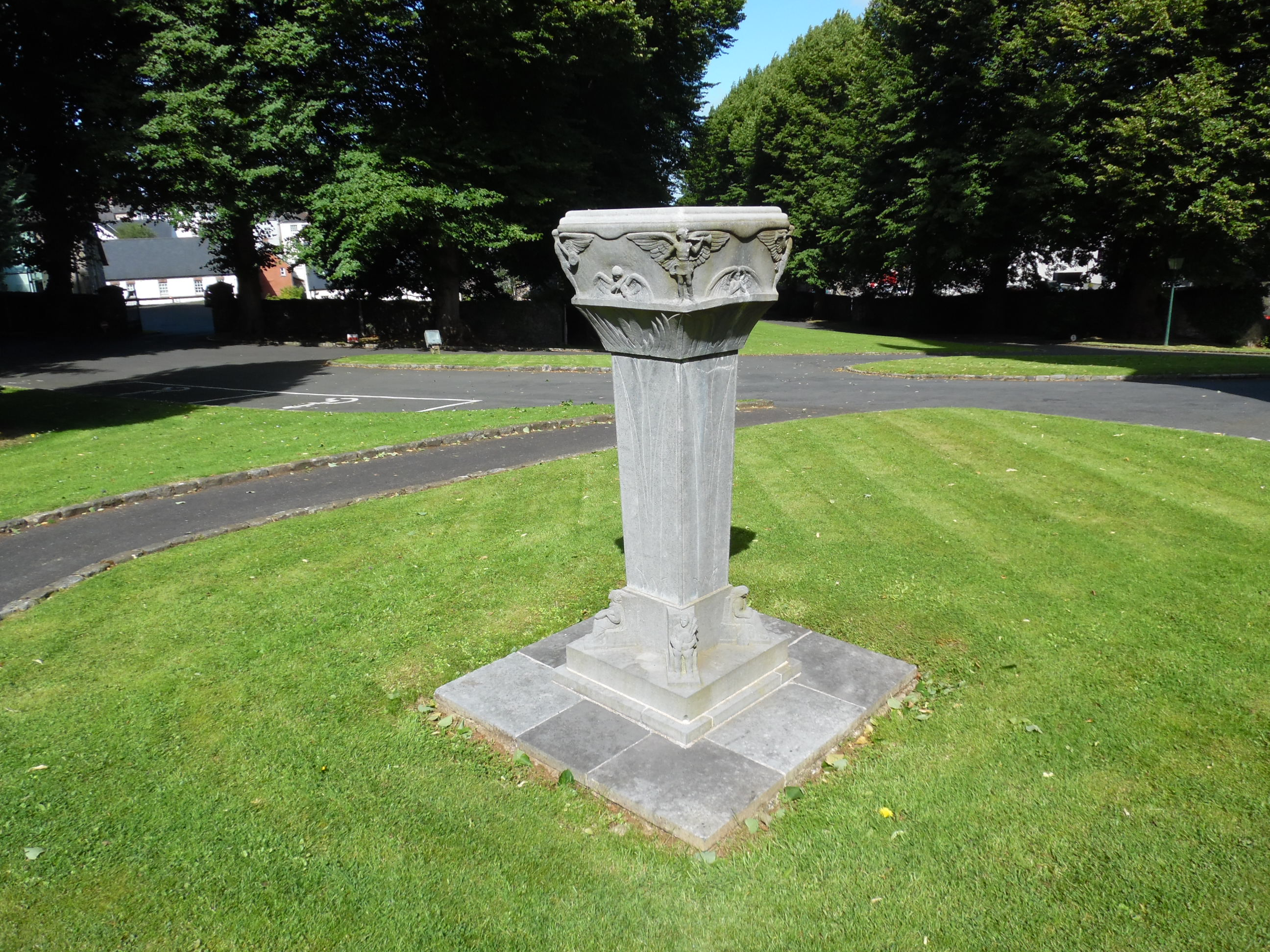
Bird bath memorial to Hamilton Harty, Hillsborough

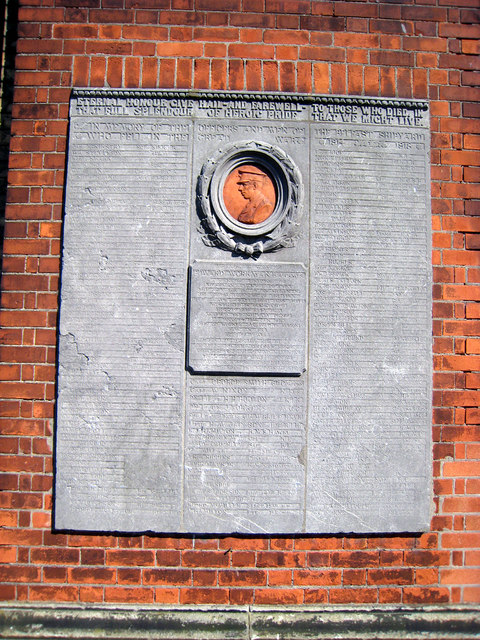
First World War memorial on Pump House, Belfast

== Awards and legacy ==
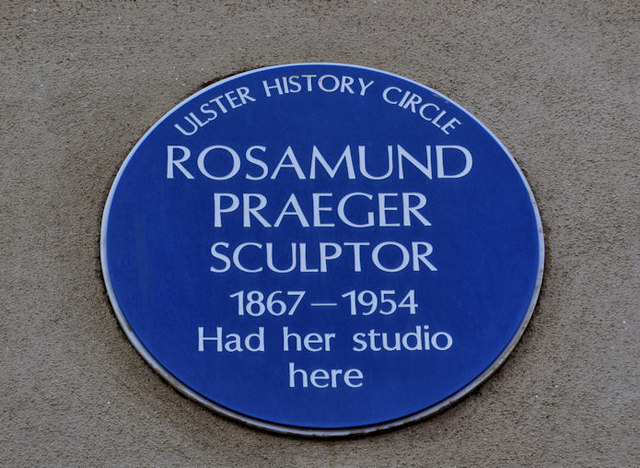
Ulster History Circle plaque on the location of Praeger's studio in Holywood

Praeger became an Honorary Academician of the Royal Hibernian Academy in 1927, received an honorary MA from Queen's University Belfast in 1938, and in 1939 was awarded the MBE.

She died at Rock Cottage, Craigavad, County Down, on 16 April 1954, the day before her 87th birthday, and was buried in the Priory Cemetery.

Praeger's work in included in the collections of the Ulster Museum and the National Gallery of Ireland, and some private collections around the world. A house at Sullivan Upper School is named after Praeger and her brother Robert.
