= Funnies (golf) =

Funnies are terms used during a game of golf to describe various achievements, both positive and negative. They are different from traditional expressions such a birdie, eagle, etc. in that they do not necessarily refer to strict scores, but to unusual events which may happen in the course of a game. They are constantly being developed and there is some variation in their interpretation and usage throughout the world.

The main use of funnies is to add interest to informal matchplay games as they enable players to win something regardless of the overall outcome of the match. They are frequently associated with gambling, with money, usually small stakes, changing hands depending on which funnies occur.

== Types of Funny ==
The most common funnies and their usual meanings are:

- Oozlum: If any person on the green in regulation (usually in one on a Par 3) has only one or two putts and so matches or beats par, they win. If more than one person succeeds, the funny goes to the one who was nearest the flag. If not won by anyone, this can be rolled over (i.e. pays out double) to the next Par 3, if this is what the players have agreed, and so on. Also called Ooozler or Oozelem.
- Woody: Making a par after hitting at least one tree.
- Sandy: Making a par (or better) having been in a bunker at some point during the hole.
- Ferret: Holing the ball from off the green for a par or better.
- Golden Ferret: Holing the ball directly from a bunker.

== Similar events ==
Other occurrences that are used for gambling:

Positive:

- Longest Drive: The longest drive of the group, but it must end up on the fairway.
- Nearest the Pin: This is won by the player who is nearest the pin with his tee shot on a Par 3, so long as the ball finishes on the green.
- Birdie: One under par (similarly, Eagle and Albatross). These can be gross or net, depending on the agreement at the start of play.
- Bye: Once the game is over, a short match (often only one or two holes) can be played to give the loser a chance to regain some pride and possibly be bought a drink in the bar afterwards. Equivalent to a beer match in cricket if the main game finishes very early.
- Hole in One: In view of how rarely this happens, it should pay out a very large amount; however, the normal result is that the successful player has to buy everyone in the bar a drink when they return to the clubhouse. Much glory but potentially costly.

Longest Drive and Nearest the Pin are most usually competed for by all of those taking part on Golf Society or corporate days with prizes for the winners.

Negative:

- Out of Turn: If you go out of turn at the start of a hole.

"Carry the Can" Funnies:

Rather like Atlas, who incorrectly was said to have been left supporting the world on his shoulders when someone passed it to him, there is a category of Funny which passes from one player to another rather than simply being won or lost as you go along. Each time it is passed, the fund is increased by one as in a skins game and the player left holding the funny at the end of the round pays out the amount it has accumulated to each of the other players.

Most common:

- The Camel: Every time any player lands in a bunker, one point is added to the camel fund and this player then "carries" the camel until another player lands in a bunker. There is sometimes a division between the Camel for a fairway bunker and The Cat (or Caterpillar) if referring to a greenside bunker, but most would consider this to be an unnecessary complication.
- The Snake: Every time any player takes three putts, one point is added to the snake fund and this player then "carries" the snake until another player three putts. In strict company, a four putt can be argued to be two snakes, and so on.

Less common:

- The Fish (or Frog): Equivalent to a Camel but relating to water hazards rather than bunkers.
- The Squirrel (or Monkey): Hit a tree. Some arguments arise whether the tree is just branches or includes foliage and whether bushes count. If in doubt assume everything counts. If it is thought that the ball must have hit a tree but all were unsighted and no sound was heard then the benefit of the doubt rests with the player.
- The Gorilla (or Bear): If you hit your ball out of bounds.

== See also ==
- Golf glossary
- Nassau (bet): a type of bet between golfers that is essentially three separate bets. Money is wagered on the best score in the front 9, back 9, and total 18 holes.
- Skins game: a type of match play in which each hole has a set value, usually in money or points, that is awarded to the winner of a hole. If any participants tie on a hole, the prize is rolled over to the subsequent hole.
