= Robert Paterson (impresario) =

Robert Paterson (March 10, 1940 – May 12, 1991), concert promoter and impresario, born in Torquay, Devon. His father, Kenneth Paterson, Colonel with the Gurkha regiment. Member of family haulage firm Carter Paterson, sold to The Big Four railway companies, 1934.

== Early life ==
Robert and his mother moved from Devon to Cape Town, South Africa, because of Robert's severe asthma in 1946 when he was 6. He was educated at Bishop's Diocesan College, Paterson discovered classical music thanks to his mother giving him an album of the classical pianist, Julius Katchen (1926–1969).

He met Katchen at Cape Town Concert Club in 1955.

Next he moved back to England in 1956 for A Levels at Priory Park School in Bath. Paterson also played Hamlet. He then went to Bristol Old Vic to learn direction and lighting. He played the Cypriot cook in the world premiere of Arnold Wesker's play The Kitchen.

== Career ==
Paterson left Bristol for London as Assistant Stage Manager at the Arts Theatre, he was also a lighting man at the Pigalle, before answering an ad in The Stage to become assistant to impresario Harold Fielding.

By 1963, Paterson was employed by Victor Hochhauser, touring with the Red Army Choir and Bolshoi Ballet around the UK before a brief spell with United Music Publishers.

Paterson's first concert as an independent promoter was "Stravinsky conducts Stravinsky" with composer, Igor Stravinsky (1882–1971) conducting The New Philharmonia Orchestra at the Royal Festival Hall, 1965. Paterson then became the European representative of Igor Stravinsky.

Later Paterson had André Previn as well as Julius Katchen, Cziffra, Leonard Pennario, Peter Schreier, Theo Adam, Charles Aznavour, Gilbert Becaud, Petula Clark, Duke Ellington, Benny Goodman, Juliette Gréco, Rolf Harris, Mahalia Jackson, B. B. King, Gordon Lightfoot, Jacques Loussier, Enrico Macias, Demis Roussos, Sacha Distel, Nana Mouskouri, Los Paraguayos, Manitas de Plata, Leontyne Price, Ivan Rebroff, Roy Orbison, The Swingle Singers.

Robert Paterson married Sybille Stock on 16 March 1968.

== 1970s ==
In 1970 Patterson had concert acts appearing under the banner "Robert Paterson presents" include: Peter, Paul and Mary, Ike and Tina Turner, Leonard Cohen, Chicago, Creedence Clearwater Revival, Memphis Slim, Dionne Warwick, Cleo Laine and Johnny Dankworth, Santana, Flock, Taj Mahal, Johnny Winter. Organizes UK and European Tours in association with local promoters for Shirley Bassey, Judy Collins, Kris Kristofferson, Rita Coolidge, Barry Manilow, Neil Diamond, Marlene Dietrich. Bing Crosby (also on Broadway), Andy Williams, Michel Legrand and Henry Mancini (stylized as Hank Mancini).

In November 1973 the Newport Jazz Festival occurred in London, a co-production of Patterson and George Wein. The same year Paterson promotes at the Wembley Arena six sold out dates with David Cassidy. Wembley Arena is also the venue for two dates with Olga Korbut and USSR gymnasts.

== Death ==
Plagued by ill health he ceased to be a major player on the concert scene. He died from liver failure May 12 1991 at age 51.
