= Robert Adams Paterson =

Rev. Robert Adams Paterson (c. 1829 – April 1904) was a Scottish-American clergyman who invented the gutta-percha golf ball — known as the guttie — in 1848.

Paterson was born in Scotland, where he attended the University of St Andrews. Golf was popular at the university, but Paterson was very poor and could not afford to buy the expensive balls, which were made with pigskin and stuffed with feathers. He instead used gutta-percha, which had been wrapped around an idol from India as packaging.

He died in Bloomfield, New York. He was a president of the New York State Ladies' College of Binghamton.
