= Robert Patterson (naturalist, born 1863) =

Irish naturalist and ornithologist (1863–1931)

Robert Patterson (1863 – 23 October 1931) was an Irish naturalist; he was the son of Richard Patterson, the grandson of Robert Patterson FRS and the nephew of Robert Lloyd Patterson (1836–1906).

Robert Patterson was interested in every branch of natural history but mainly birds. He was an editor at the ‘’Irish Naturalist’’. He was a member of the Belfast Natural History and Philosophical Society and the Belfast Naturalists' Field Club. He co-founded the Ulster Fisheries and Marine Biology Association. He also founded the People's Palace, or Patterson Museum, in Belfast which opened in 1904. This was a natural history (mainly birds) and archaeological museum intended for the free instruction of the people.
