= Robert Patterson (naturalist, born 1802) =

Irish businessman, naturalist and entomologist

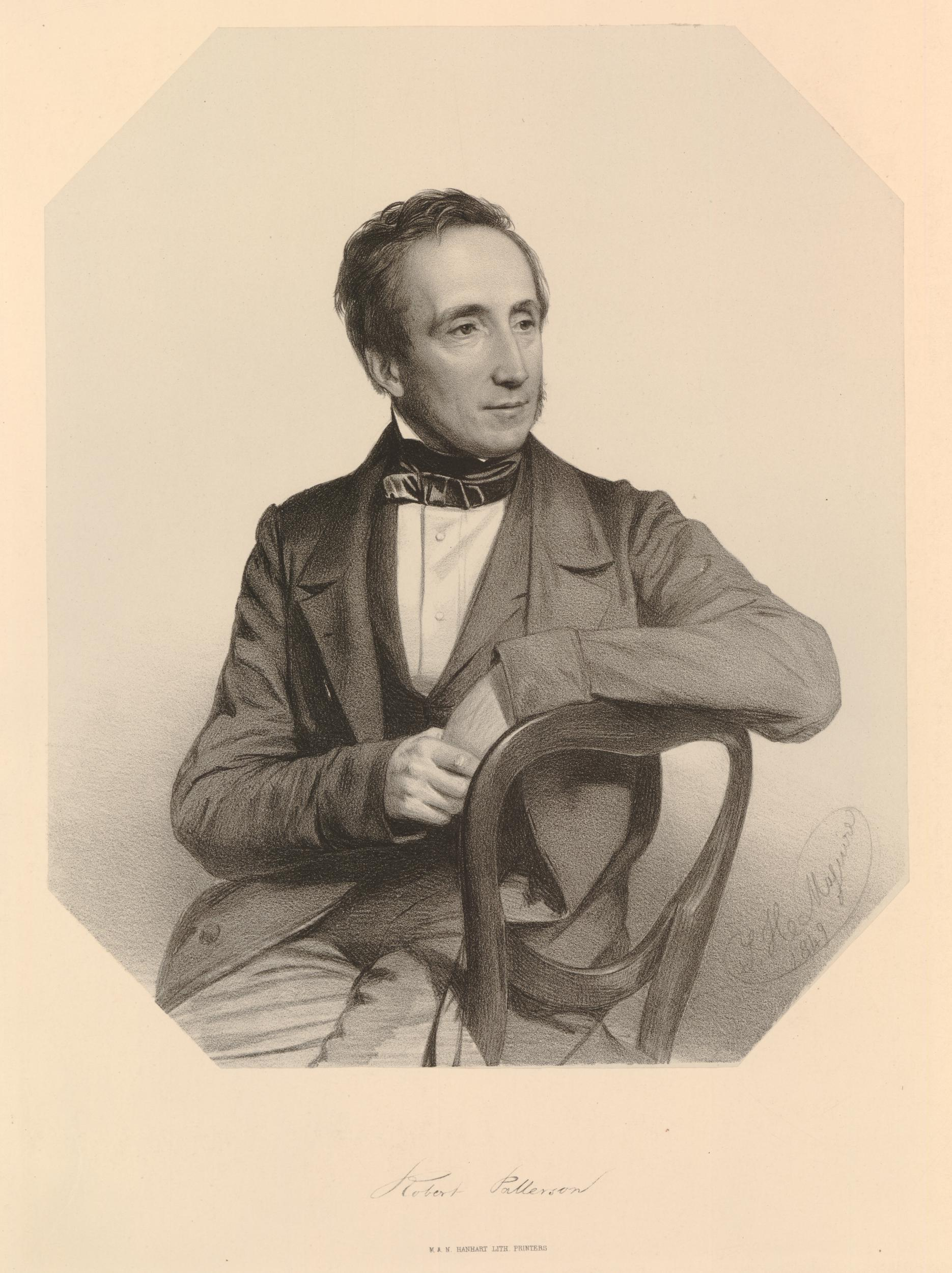
Portrait of Robert Patterson, half-length sitting on chair, upper body turned and looking to right over back of the chair.

Robert Patterson, FRS (18 April 1802 – 1872) was an Irish businessman and naturalist born in Belfast, Ireland.

== Biography ==
The eldest son of Robert Patterson (1750–1831), owner of a mill-furnishing business in Belfast established in 1786, Robert Patterson was born into a wealthy family. He was educated first at the Belfast Academy under the direction of a Dr. Bryce, and then at the Belfast Academical Institution. Here he won a prize for an essay on the natural history of Lough Neagh.

When his father died in 1831, Patterson took over management of the family business, and kept this position until his death. He and his wife Mary settled at No. 3 College Square North, Belfast, where most of his 11 children were born.

At the age of 19, Robert Patterson was one of seven young men who, on 5 June 1821, gathered at the house of Dr. James Lawson Drummond, at No. 5, Chichester Street to form the Belfast Natural History Society, which established the first museum in Ireland to be built by public subscription, at No. 7 College Square North. He served the society, later renamed, for more than fifty years, occupying every office. He was also a member of the Belfast Literary Society and the Royal Irish Academy. He was a co-founder of the Ulster Society for the Prevention of Cruelty to Animals. The Royal Society elected him a Fellow in 1859, and he was an early member of the British Association, serving as secretary to the Natural History section.

Established as a significant naturalist in his thirties, Patterson had close links with Charles Darwin, Thomas Bell, Edward Forbes, William Yarrell and Charles Lucien Bonaparte.

Patterson died at his house in College Square North, Belfast, in February, 1872, after a fall.

== Family ==
In 1833 he married Mary Ferrar, a poet; they had 11 children.

His sons William and Robert Lloyd Patterson were also naturalists; his grandchildren include Robert Patterson, Robert Lloyd Praeger and Rosamond Praeger.

== Books ==
- Insects Mentioned in Shakespeare's Plays (1842)
- A Glossary of Words in Use in the Counties of Antrim and Down – a dialect study
- Zoology for Schools (1846–48; later editions).
- First Steps in Zoology (1849-1851)
- Verses by Robert and Mary Patterson (1886)
- Ed. Volume 4 of William Thompson's Natural History of Ireland (1856).

Patterson also prepared, for the Department of Science and Art, a series of large coloured diagrams, illustrated by Joseph Wolf. These were widely used in schools in Britain, Ireland and the United States.

== Gallery ==
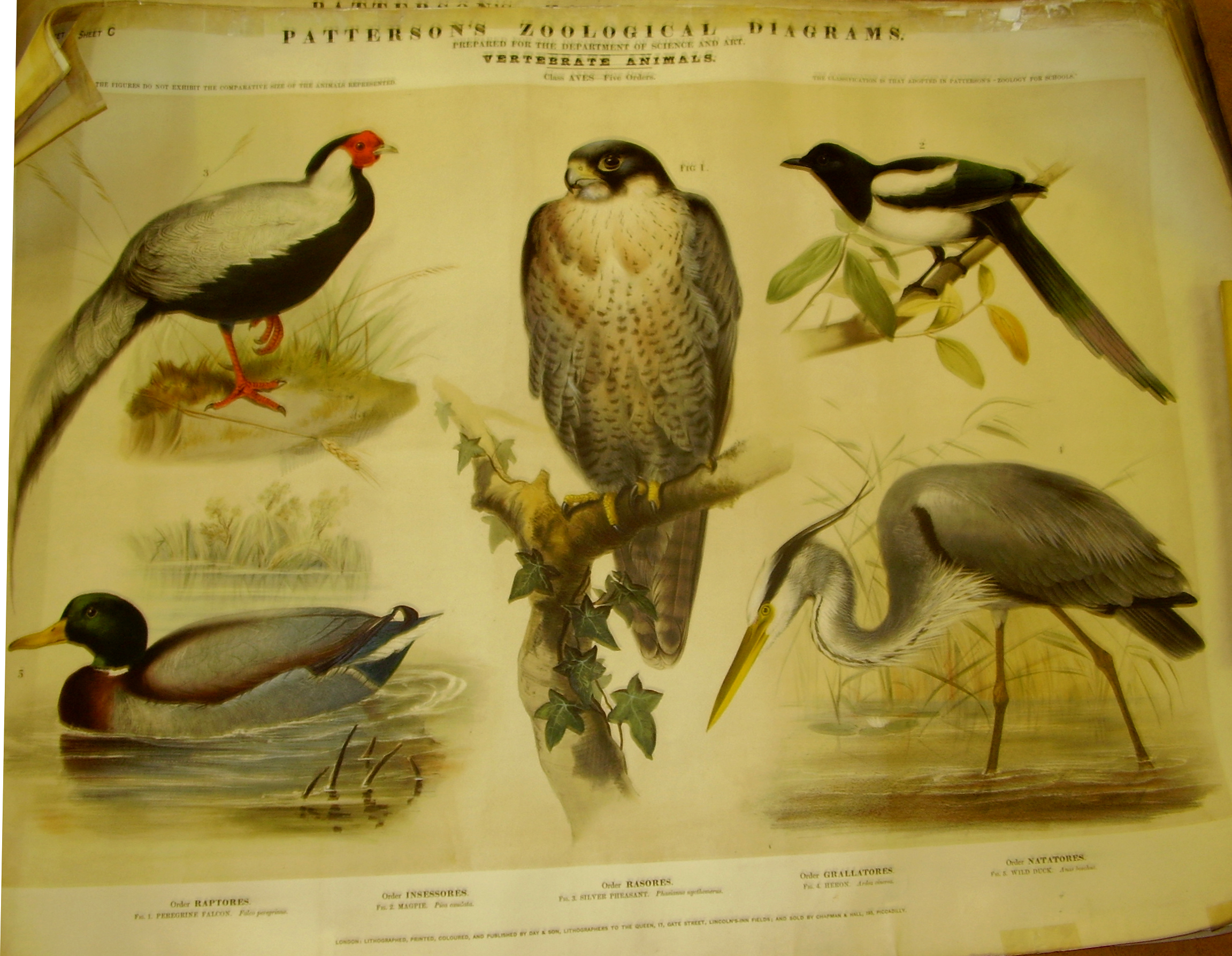
Patterson Zoological Chart

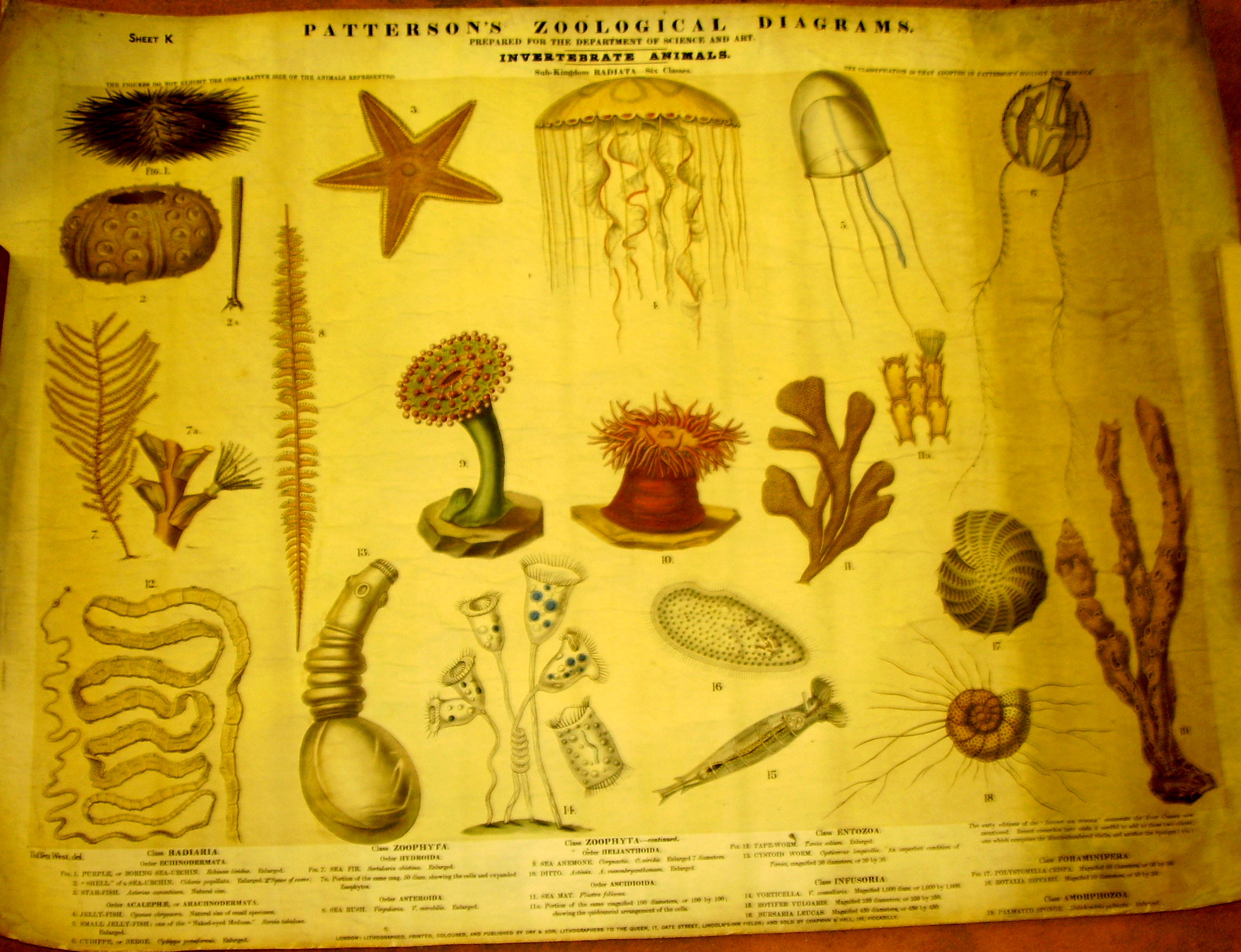
Patterson Zoological Chart
