= Bobby Patterson (surfer) =

Robert George Patterson ("Bobby" or "Flea", born February 22, 1935), was a surfing star of the 1950s.

== Life and career ==
The oldest of three surfing brothers, Robert, Ronald and Raymond and one of the first surfing "nose riders", Bobby came to California from Hawaii circa 1953, and stayed in Santa Monica, initially with surfer Mickey Munoz. He married Mary Quijano in 1962 and had three children Kimberly, Kerrick and Jolien (Joe). He also had another daughter from a later marriage named Michelle. For many years, he was a prominent "Surfboards by Velzy" team member. Bobby and his brothers later became the backbone production team of the Hobie Surfboards manufacturing plant in Dana Point, CA.

Patterson won the Malibu Invitational surfing competition in 1964.

I was a judge at the '64 contest and watched 29-year-old Bobby Patterson, 10 years past his prime, still win easily. 1953-'60 there was no better surfer in the world. Patterson, tops in Hawaii, had brought nose riding to Malibu's perfect wave and even according to Mickey Munoz, taught us all by example. - Tom Norey -

== See also ==
- List of surfers
