= Outline of golf =

Overview of and topical guide to golf

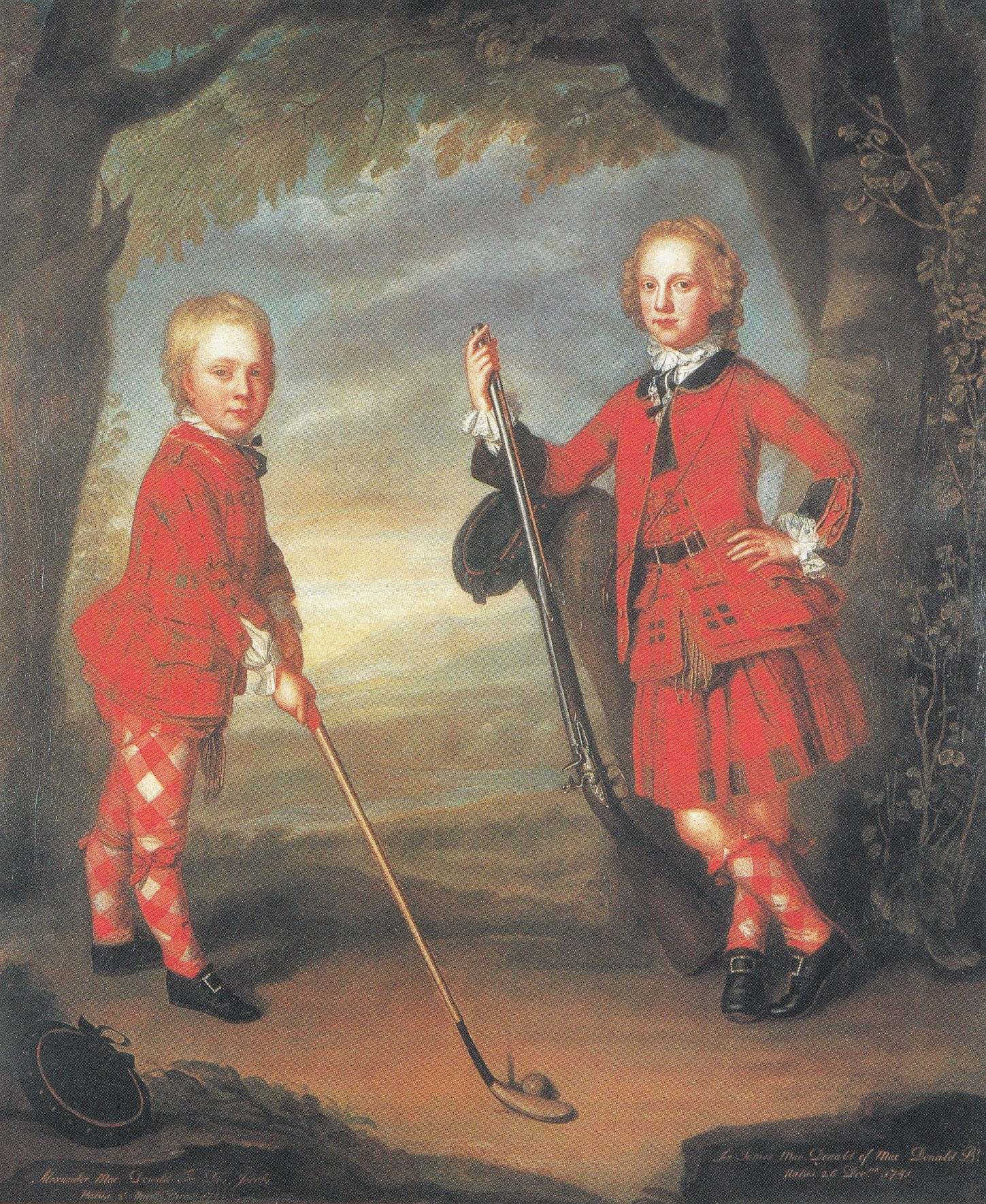
The MacDonald boys playing golf by 18th-century portrait painter Jeremiah Davison

The following outline is provided as an overview of and topical guide to golf:

Golf – precision club and ball sport, in which competing players (or golfers) use many types of clubs to hit balls into a series of holes on a golf course using the fewest strokes.

== Description of golf ==
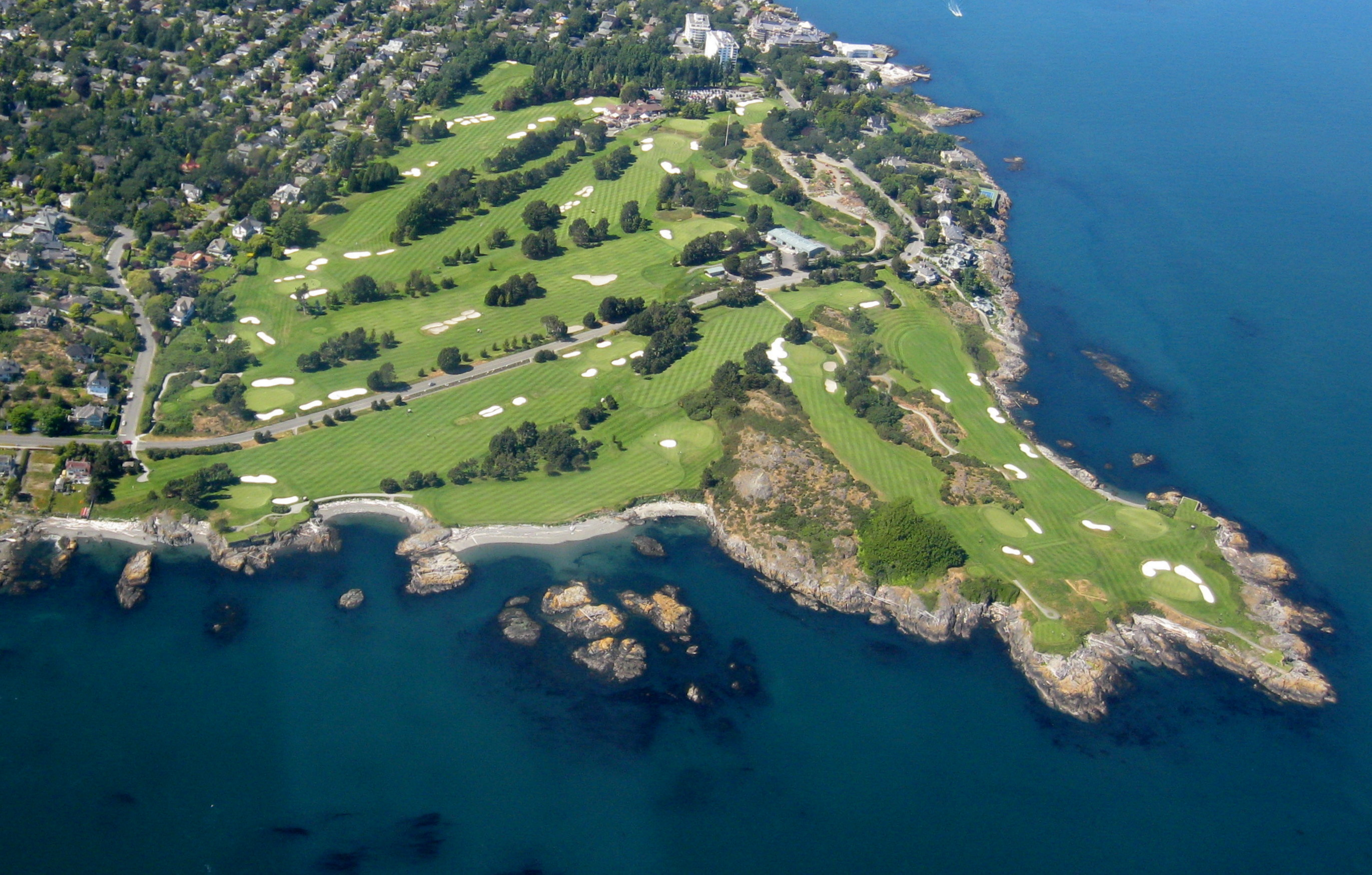
Aerial view of a golf course

Golf can be described as all of the following:

- a form of entertainment or recreation
  - a game
    - a ball game
  - a sport
    - a precision sport

== Variations of golf ==
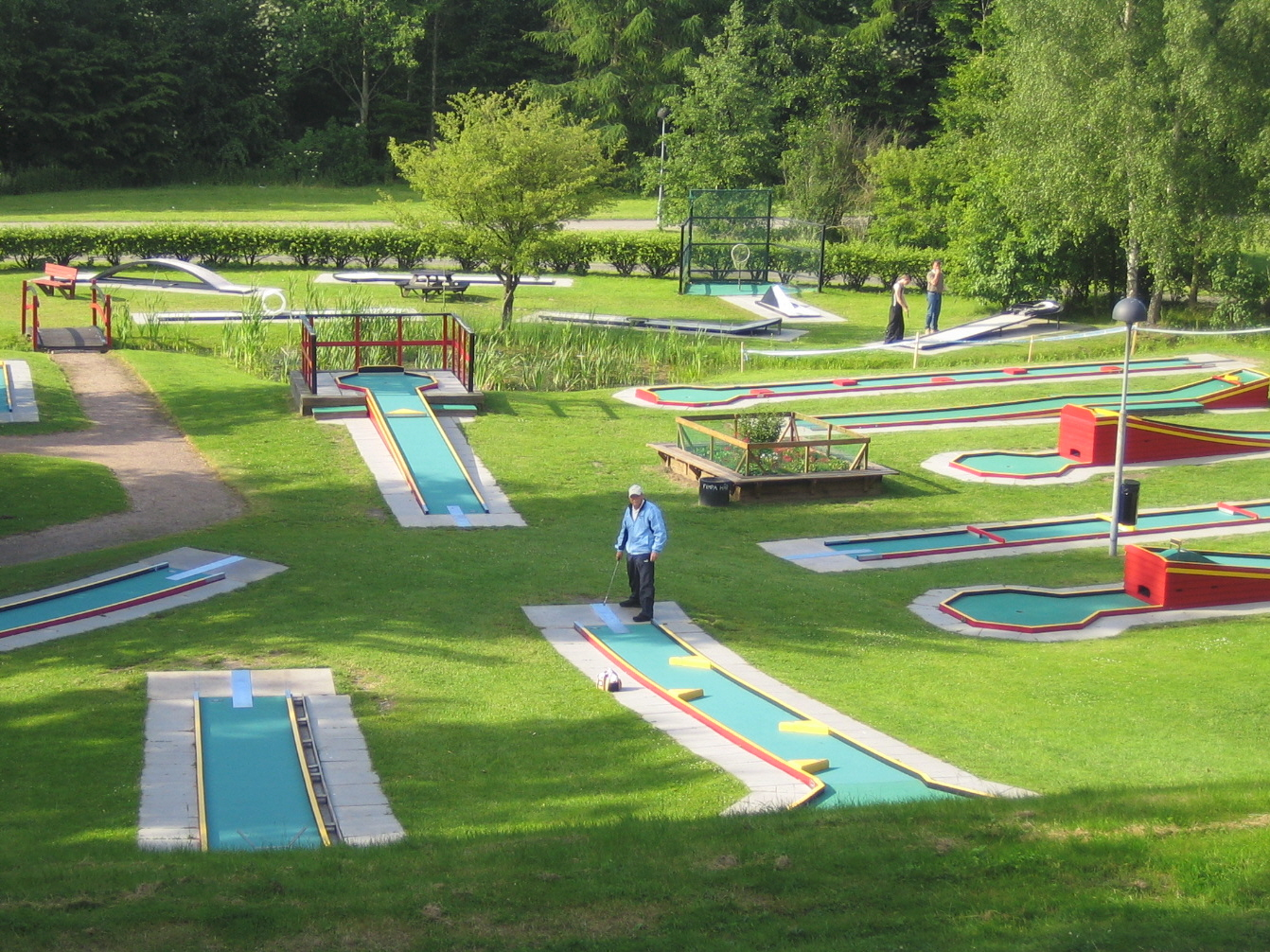
Miniature golf course in Bulltoftaparken in Malmö, Sweden

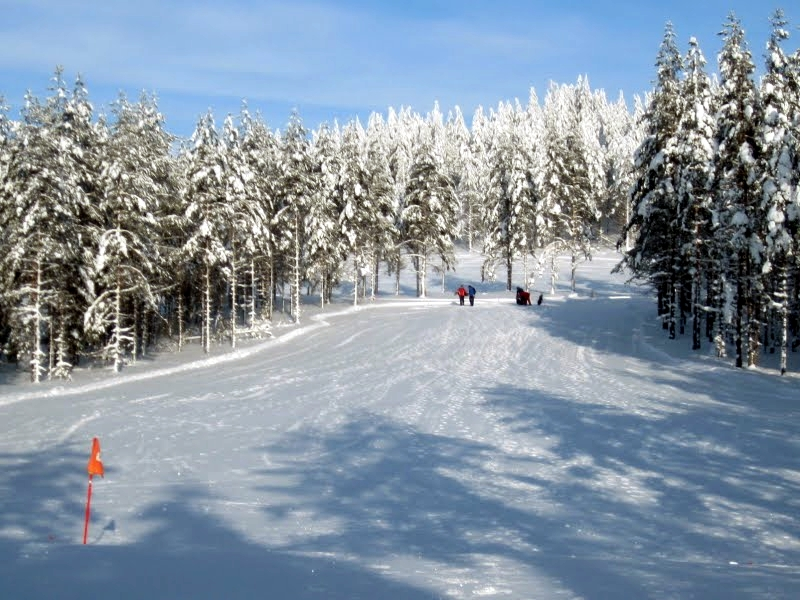
Snow golf

- Scoring
  - Stroke play
  - Match play
  - Stableford
  - Skins game
- Formats
  - Four-ball (better-ball)
  - Foursome (alternate shot)
- Variations
  - Long drive
  - Speed golf
  - Pitch and putt
  - Miniature golf
  - Clock golf
  - Indoor golf
  - Beach golf
  - Snow golf
  - Disc golf
  - Footgolf
  - Sholf
  - Dart golf

== History of golf ==
The Repton Bridge on Stoke Park's Golf Course, opened in July 1909

History of golf

- Timeline of golf
  - Timeline of golf history (1353–1850)
  - Timeline of golf history (1851–1945)
  - Timeline of golf history (1945–1999)
  - Timeline of golf (2000–present)
- Golf book

== Golf course ==
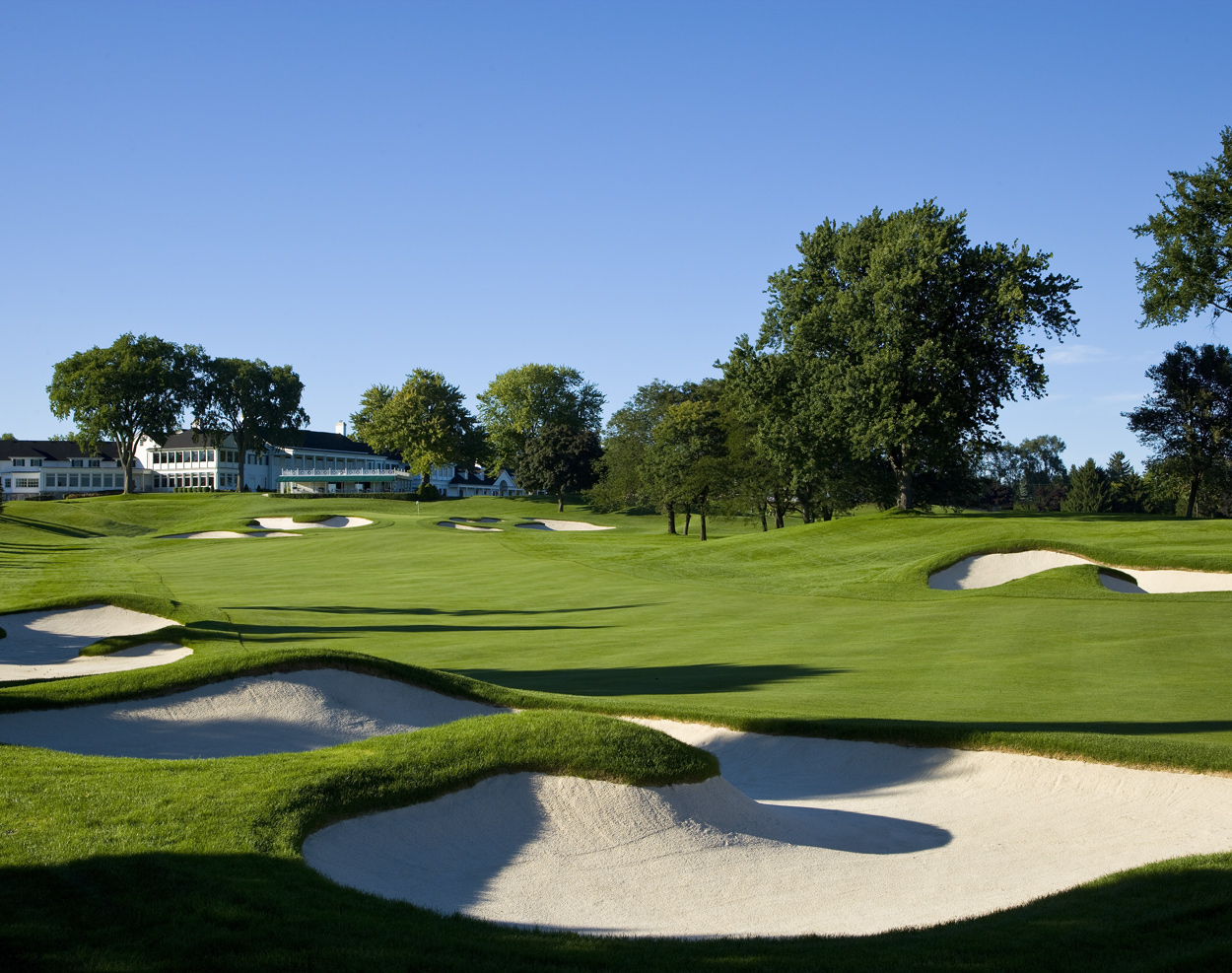
Fairway bunkers at the Oakland Hills Country Club, Bloomfield Township, Michigan

Golf course

- Driving range
- Greenskeeper
- Hazards
- Links
- Teeing ground

=== Golf courses around the world ===
- List of golf courses in Canada
- List of golf courses in India
- List of golf courses in North Dakota
- List of golf courses in Portugal
- List of golf courses in the Philippines
- List of golf courses in the United Kingdom

== Rules of golf ==
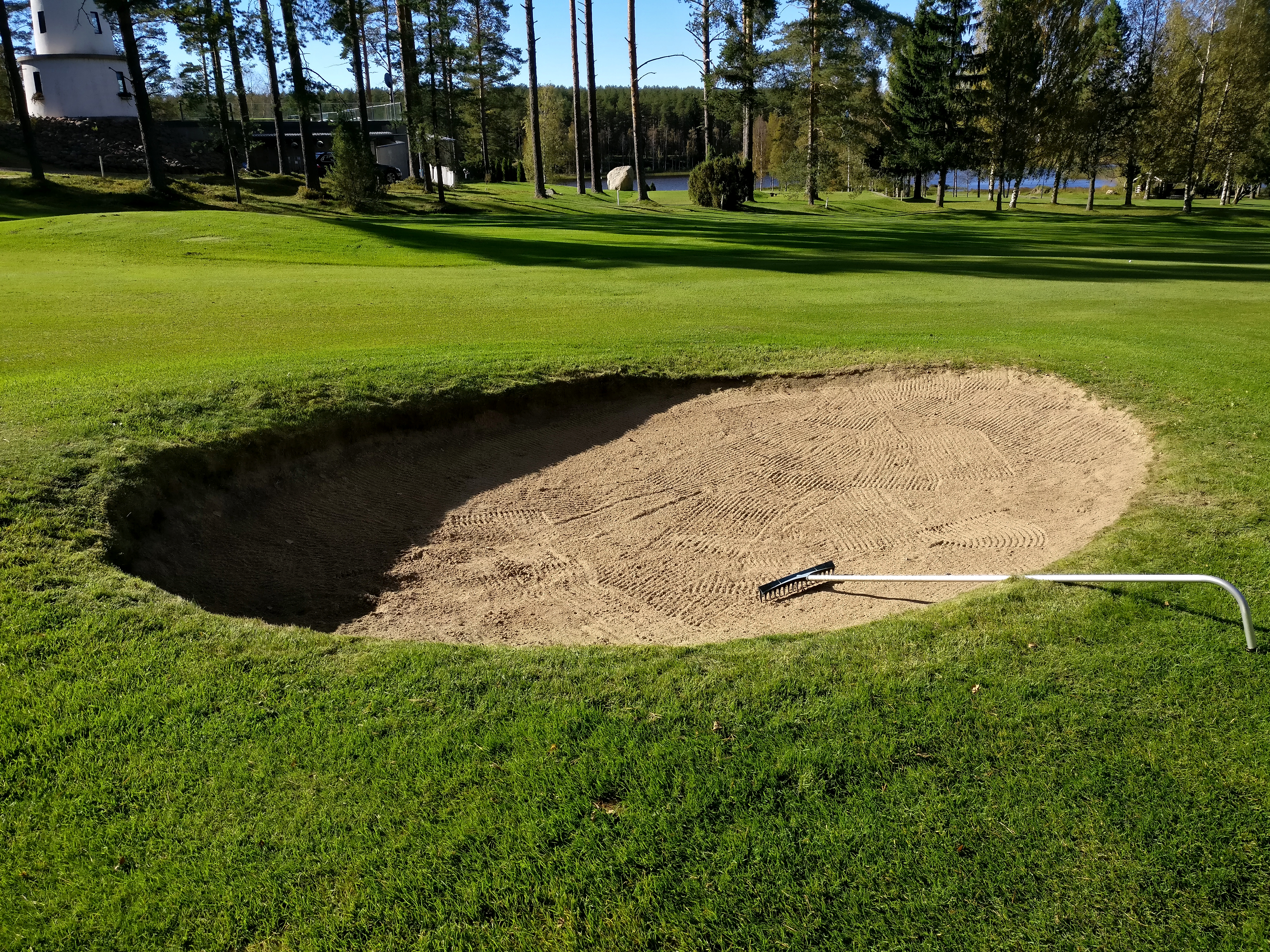
After a bunker shot, a player should rake the sand smooth again.

Rules of golf

- Penalty
- Scoring
- Golf etiquette

=== Golf equipment ===
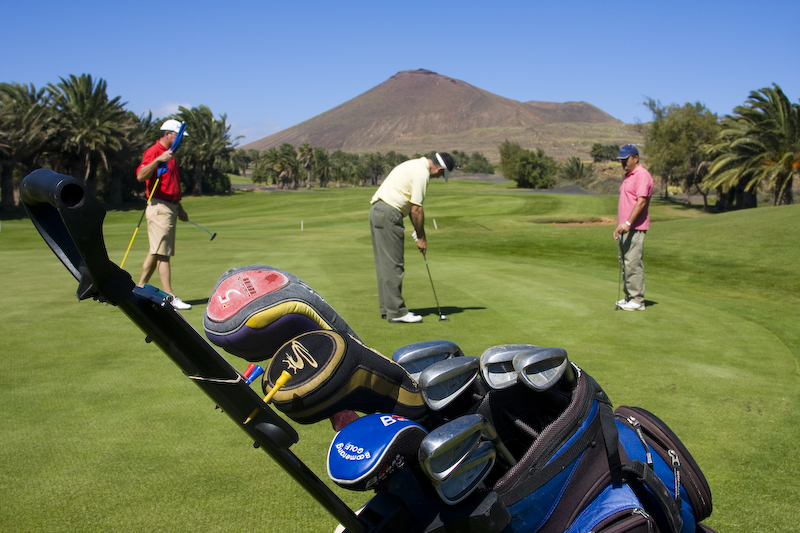
Golf clubs in a golf bag

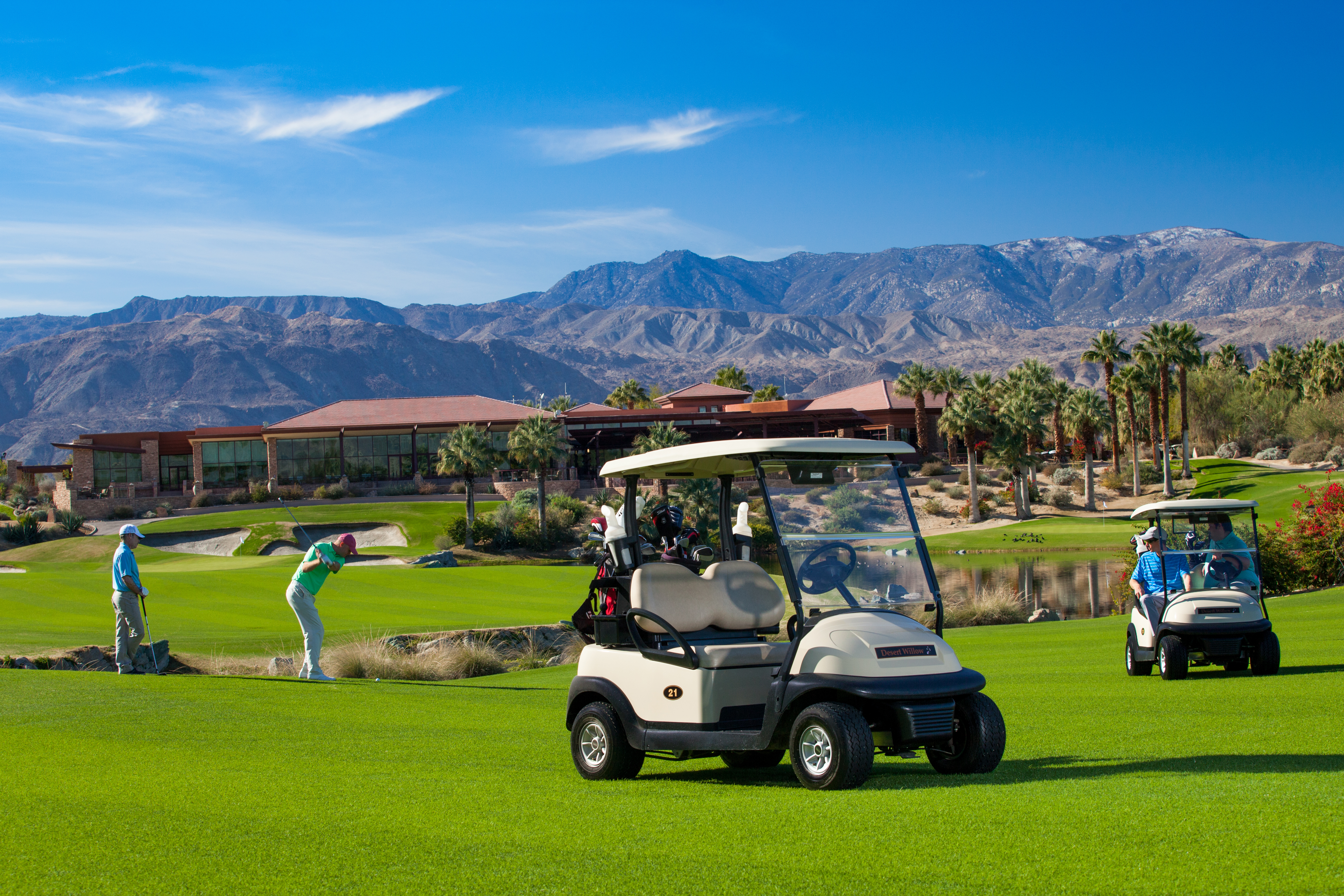
Golf cart

Golf equipment

- Golf clubs
  - Wood
  - Putter
  - Iron
  - Wedge
    - Pitching wedge
    - Gap wedge
    - Sand wedge
    - Lob wedge
  - Hybrid
  - Obsolete golf clubs
- Golf ball
  - Golf ball retriever
- Golf bag
- Golf cart
- Golf trolley
- Tee

== Game play ==
- Golf swing
- Drive

== Golf culture ==
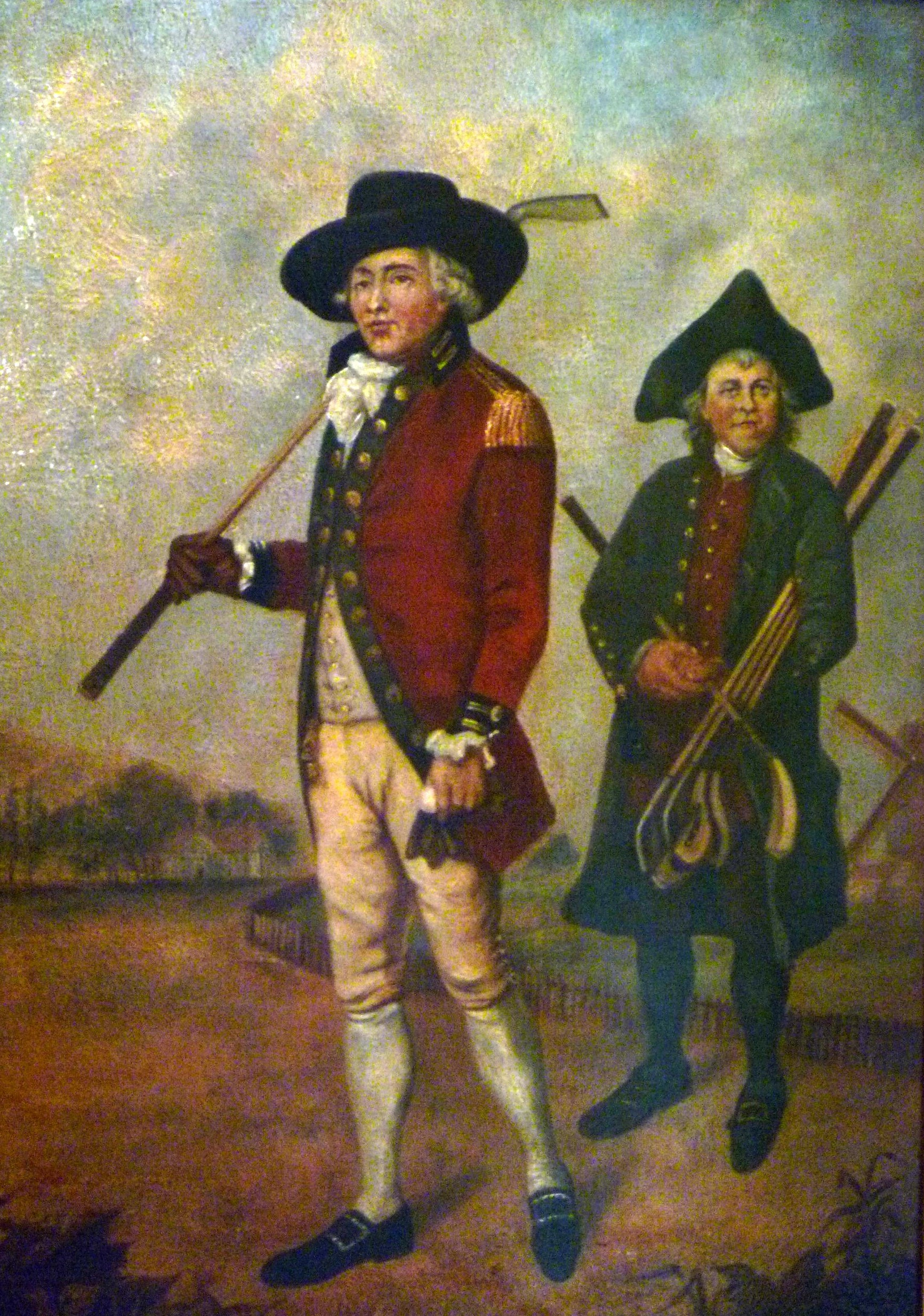
A golf caddie, 1790, by Lemuel Francis Abbott

- Caddie
- Golf instruction
- Golf mirror
- List of golf video games

== Golf organizations ==
- International Golf Federation
- The R&A
- United States Golf Association
- Professional Golfers' Association (Great Britain and Ireland)
- Professional Golfers' Association of America
- Golf Australia

== Golf competitions ==
- Grand Slam
  - Men's major golf championships
  - Women's major golf championships
  - Senior major golf championships
- Professional tours
  - LPGA
  - PGA Tour
  - PGA European Tour
- Team competitions
  - Ryder Cup
  - Presidents Cup
  - Solheim Cup
  - International Crown
  - Seve Trophy
  - EurAsia Cup
  - Walker Cup
  - Eisenhower Trophy
  - Curtis Cup
  - Espirito Santo Trophy
- Multi-sport games
  - Golf at the Summer Olympics
  - Golf at the Asian Games
  - Golf at the Pacific Games
  - Golf at the Pan American Games
  - Golf at the Summer Universiade
  - Golf at the Youth Olympic Games
- Rankings
  - Official World Golf Ranking
  - Women's World Golf Rankings
  - World Amateur Golf Ranking

== Golf by country ==
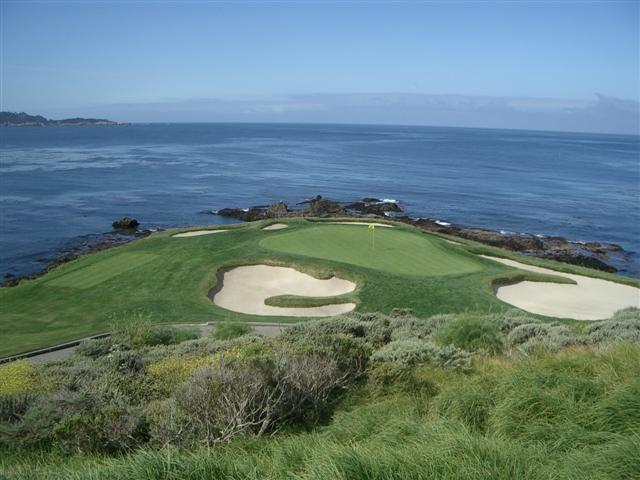
Pebble Beach Golf Links

- Golf in Australia
- Golf in China
- Golf in India
- Golf in Ireland
- Golf in the Philippines
- Golf in Russia
- Golf in Scotland
- Golf in Thailand
- Golf in the United States

== Media coverage of golf ==
=== Golf on US media ===
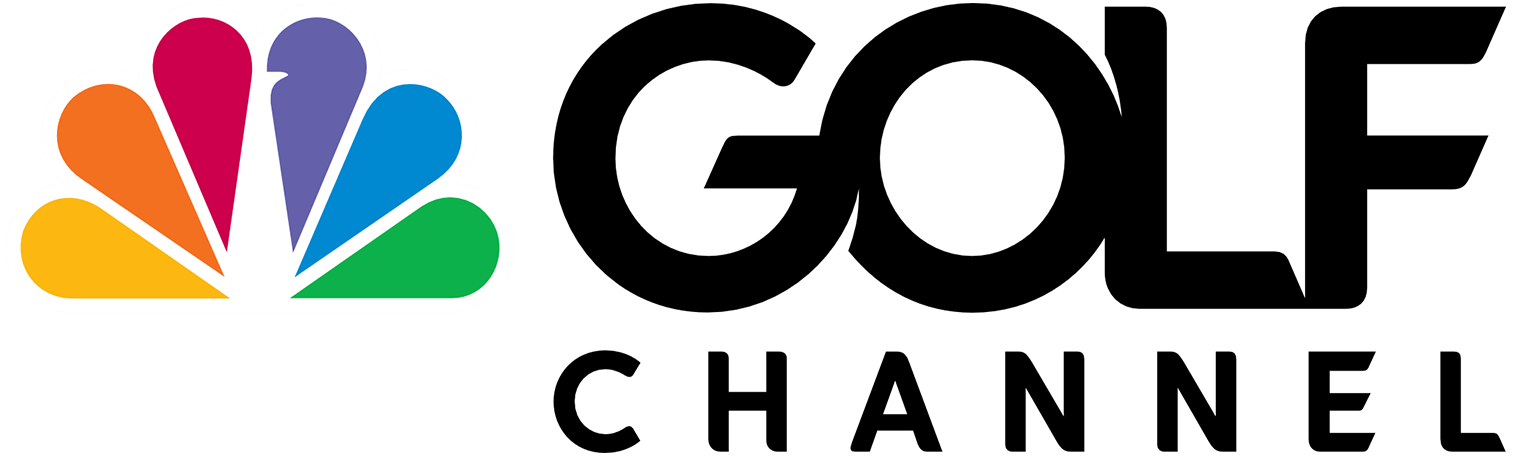
The Golf Channel focuses on live coverage of tournaments, as well as factual and instructional programming.

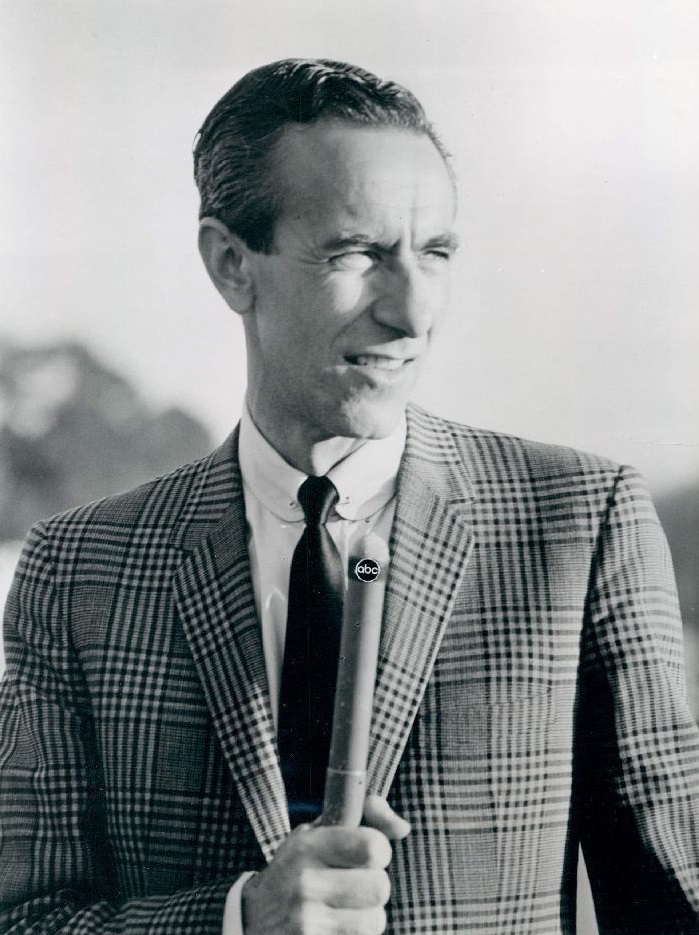
ABC golf commentator Chris Schenkel in 1964

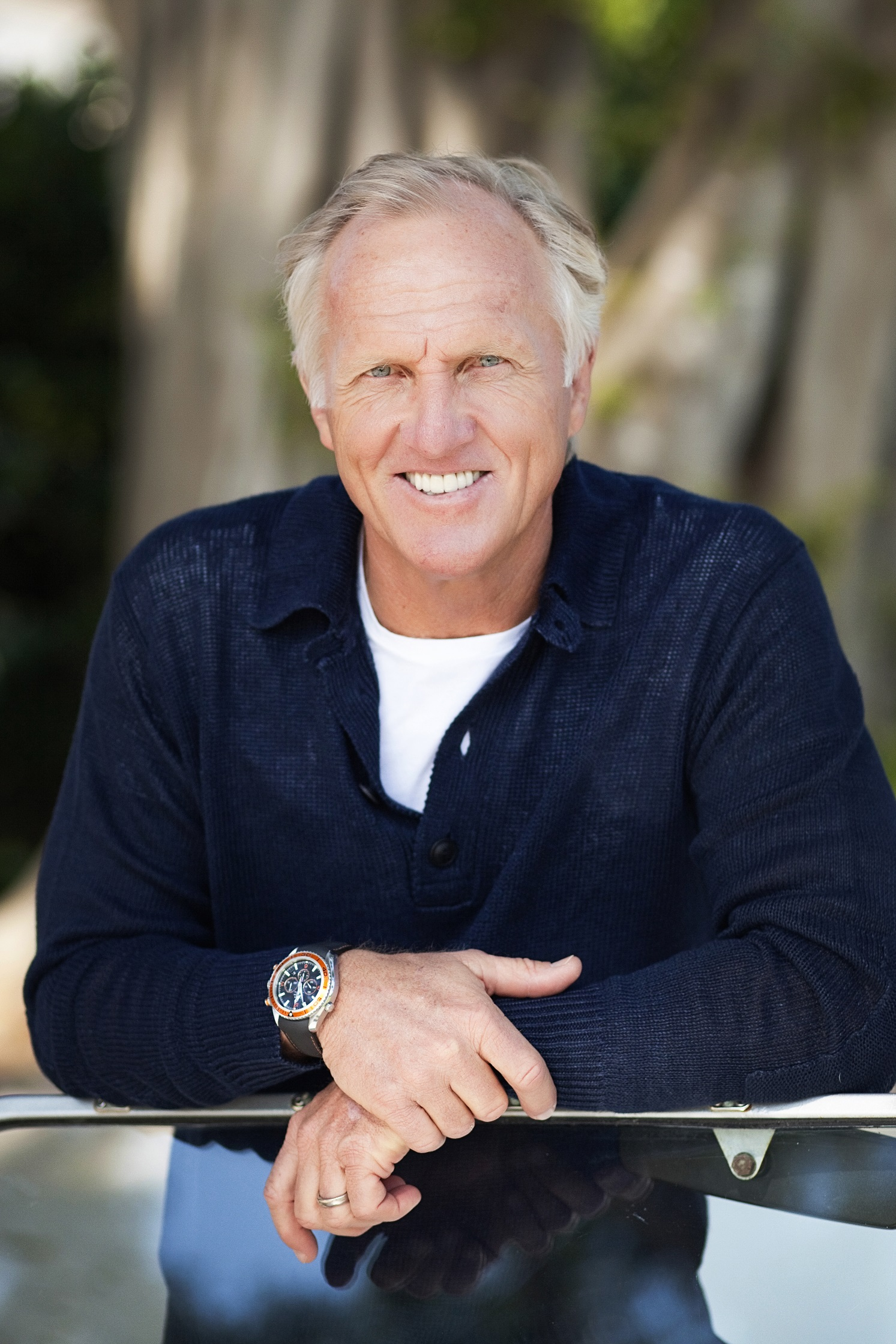
Fox USGA commentator Greg Norman in 2013

- Broadcast television partners
  - PGA Tour on ABC
  - PGA Tour on CBS
  - Golf on Fox
  - Golf Channel on NBC
- Cable television partners
  - Golf on ESPN
  - Fox Sports 1
  - Golf Channel
  - Golf on TNT
  - PGA Tour on USA
  - Golf Channel
    - The Big Break
    - Feherty
    - Fore Inventors Only
    - Golf Central
    - Highway 18
    - Live From...
    - Shell's Wonderful World of Golf
- Radio partners
  - ESPN Radio
  - SiriusXM PGA Tour Radio
- Personalities by network
  - List of ESPN/ABC golf commentators
  - List of PGA Tour on CBS commentators
  - Fox USGA#Commentators
  - List of Golf Channel personalities
  - List of Golf Channel on NBC commentators
  - Golf on TNT#Commentators
  - PGA Tour on USA#Commentators
- Other programs
  - Dan Doh!!
  - Défi mini-putt
  - The Golf Show
  - Monday Night Golf
  - The Scottish Golf Show
  - Wandering Golfer
- Golf publications
  - Golf Digest
  - Golf Magazine
  - Golf World
  - Golfweek
  - Links
  - Travel + Leisure Golf
  - List of golf video games

== Persons influential in golf ==
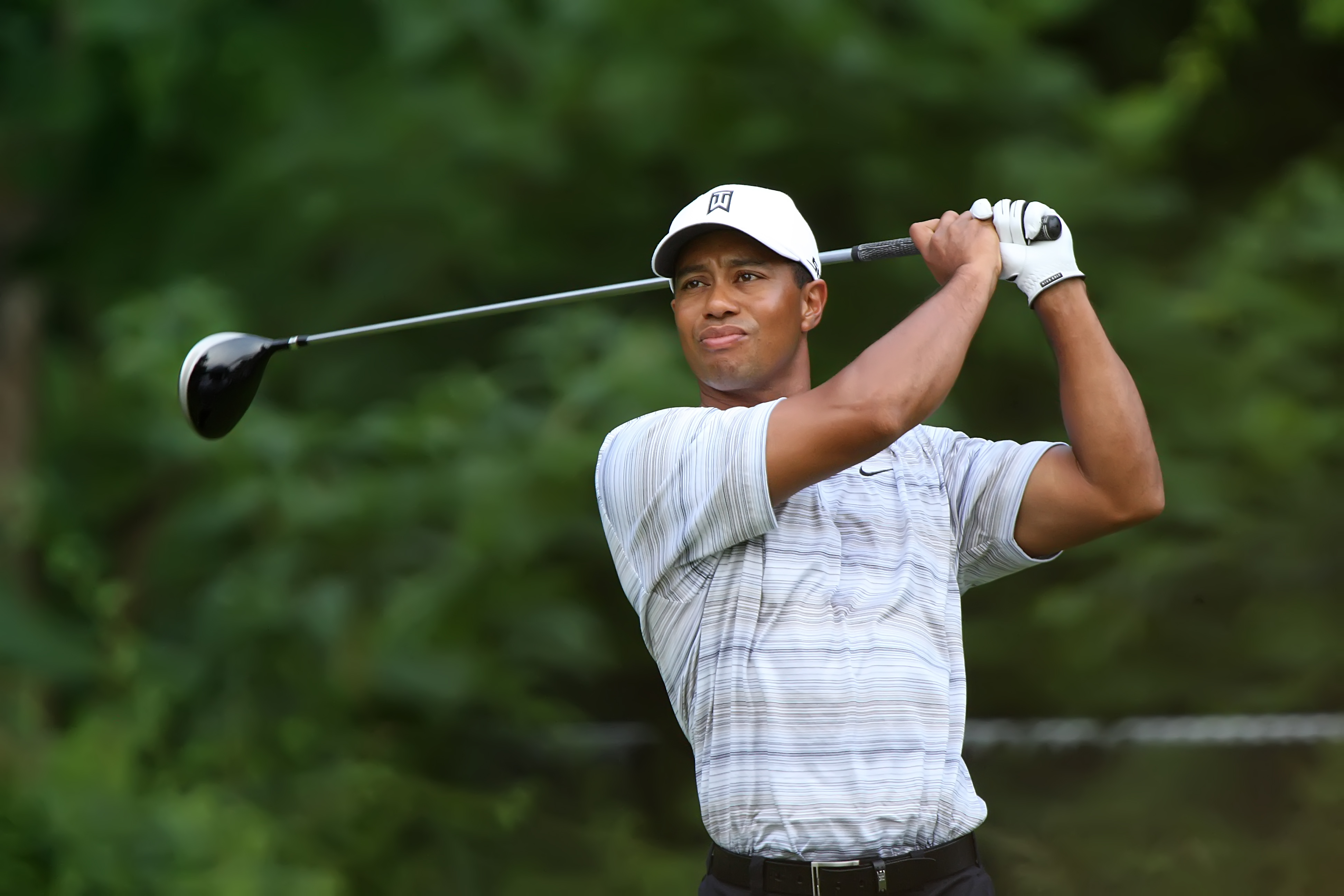
Tiger Woods in 2007

- List of male golfers
- List of female golfers
- List of men's major championships winning golfers
- List of LPGA major championship winning golfers
- List of Champions Tour major championship winning golfers
- List of golfers with most Asian Tour wins
- List of golfers with most Challenge Tour wins
- List of golfers with most European Tour wins
- List of golfers with most Japan Golf Tour wins
- List of golfers with most LPGA Tour wins
- List of golfers with most Ladies European Tour wins
- List of golfers with most PGA Tour Champions wins
- List of golfers with most PGA Tour wins
- List of golfers with most Korn Ferry Tour wins
- List of golfers with most wins in one PGA Tour event
- List of golf course architects
- List of Olympic medalists in golf

== Terminology ==
- Glossary of golf

== See also ==
- Outline of sports
