= Lob wedge =

Golf club

A lob wedge, also known as a lofted wedge or an L-Wedge, is a wedge used in the sport of golf, known for being one of the shortest-hitting clubs and providing the most loft on a shot. Lob wedges are used to produce shots with a very high arc, and are most often used for shots over hazards and other obstructions. Due to the high arc of the shot the lob wedge, like the other wedges in the set of irons, produces little roll after landing on the putting green and can even be used to produce backspin if necessary. Lob wedges are one of the newest additions to the modern collection of golf clubs and, along with the sand wedge and gap wedge, were not included prior to 1931.

== Design ==
Lob wedges are part of the iron family of golf clubs and are designed for short, high arc shots. Lob wedges and ultra lob wedges are designed with the shortest shafts and the highest loft of all golf clubs. Regular lob wedges may come in a variety of lofts, usually starting around 56 degrees and approaching 60. While those above 60 degrees are rare, often up to 64 degrees, they do exist and are referred to as "x-wedges", extreme lob wedges, or ultra lob wedges. Other differences between the lob wedge and the rest of the wedge family include the less pronounced flange on the sole allowing the club to slide under the ball more easily and less degrees of bounce (often between 0–10 degrees). The low bounce was designed out of the necessity of professionals who found that the higher bounce sand wedge was making it difficult to produce the spin they desired, especially out of tight lies.

== Use ==
Lob wedges can be used for a variety of shots including pitch and runs and pitching over an obstacle, particularly shots requiring a very high arc, a large amount of backspin or both. Pitching over an obstacle is used in situations where a hazard of some sort, usually a water hazard, bunker or tree, is located in the line of the shot between the ball's current location and the target (often on the putting green). By utilizing a lob wedge for these short shots, the ball is carried much higher in the air than with a standard iron causing significantly less roll on the landing surface. This is most often important for short shots into difficult pin placements. Before the invention of the lob wedge, or to create a shot similar to the lob wedge, the golfer was required to perform the shot with a sand wedge or pitching wedge and to modify the shot by cutting across the ball making a glancing blow, a much riskier shot.

== History ==
Traditional sets of golf irons did not always include the lob wedge. Before 1931, golfers used a single wedge, known as a "jigger", similar to the modern day pitching wedge. After 1931, additional wedges entered the golf bag starting with the sand wedge. The lob wedge was first envisioned by Dave Pelz, a former physicist for NASA, who recognized the need for higher loft wedges (at the time 60 degrees) due to the increasing complexity of the putting greens being designed at the time. This concept was taken up by the professional golfer Tom Kite, who began using the lob wedge professionally on tour spurring other professionals to follow his lead. The mainstream lob wedge was invented by Karsten Solheim, the founder of the PING line of golf products, possibly after experimenting by gluing a potato chip to a straw. Solheim was also responsible for naming the club the "L Wedge" or the "Lob Wedge", as it is currently known today.
