= Iron (golf) =

Type of golf club

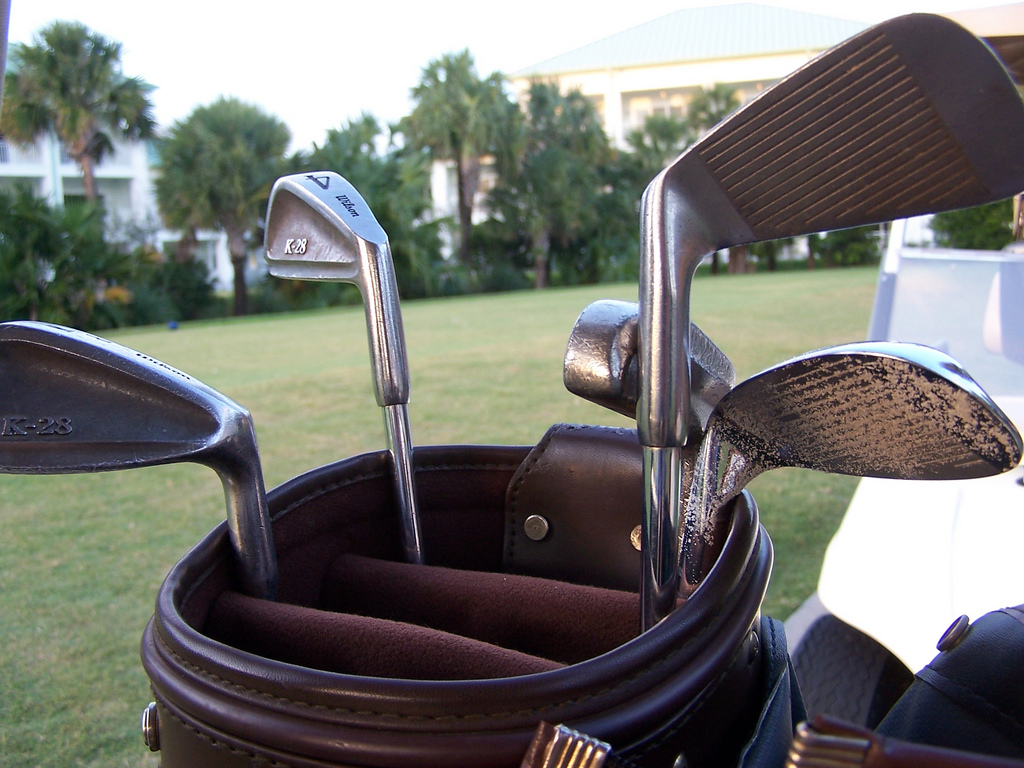
Irons in a golf bag

An iron is a type of club used in the sport of golf to propel the ball towards the hole. Irons typically have shorter shafts and smaller clubheads than woods, the head is made of solid iron or steel, and the head's primary feature is a large, flat, angled face, usually scored with grooves. Irons are used in a wide variety of situations, typically from the teeing ground on many par-3 holes, from the fairway or rough as the player approaches the green, and to extract the ball from hazards, such as bunkers or even shallow water hazards.

Irons are the most common type of club; a standard set of 14 golf clubs will usually contain between 7 and 11 irons, including wedges. Irons are customarily differentiated by a number from 1 to 10 (most commonly 3 to 9) that indicates the relative angle of loft on the clubface, although a set of irons will also vary in clubhead size, shaft length, and hence lie angle as the loft (and number) increase. Irons with higher loft than the numbered irons are called wedges, which are typically marked with a letter indicating their name, and are used for a variety of "utility" shots requiring short distances or high launch angles.

Prior to about 1940, irons were given names rather than numbers. Some of these names, e.g. mashie, niblick, are found in literature of the early twentieth century. Although these clubs and their names are considered obsolete, occasionally a modern club manufacturer will give a new iron the old name.

== Design and manufacture ==
Historically all irons were forged from a flat piece of metal, which produced a thin clubhead that resembled a blade. Modern investment casting processes enabled manufacturers to easily mass-produce clubs with consistent properties. This manufacturing process was first used by Ping, and also made it possible to take weight out of the back of the clubhead and distribute it around the perimeter. These perimeter weighted, or cavity back, irons made it much easier to achieve consistent results even when striking the ball outside the "sweet spot", when compared with traditional bladed, or "muscle back", irons.

In 1933, Willie Ogg – who was serving as an advisory staff member for Wilson Staff – created a patented design for distributing weight away from the heel of the club head, moving it towards the "sweet spot" of the blade. This design feature was used in the Wilson "Ogg-mented" irons, the forerunner of perimeter-weighted or cavity back irons.

Although most irons are now produced by investment casting, many high end iron sets are still produced by forging, as the resulting clubhead is easier to adjust by bending to adapt the set to a player's specific needs. The resulting club is also generally thought to have an improved "feel" due to the softer consistency of the forged metal as opposed to cast.

Manufacturers sometimes try to combine the characteristics of both muscle and cavity backed irons, which has resulted in terminology such as "cut-muscle", or "split-cavity" to describe these designs.

There are also many hybrid clubs, so-called because they combine some of the characteristics of irons and woods, that closely resemble standard irons. Many sets of clubs, especially those marketed for beginners, now include hybrids to replace the more traditional 3 and 4 irons.

=== Muscle back ===
A muscle back is the more traditional design and consists of a solid metal head, typically made of forged iron. The design of the club typically distributes the metal more evenly around the clubhead (though most designs still place more weight along the sole of the club), which makes the center of mass of the club higher and the moment of inertia (the clubhead's resistance to rotation) lower as compared to newer cavity-backed designs. As such, these clubs are said to have a smaller "sweet spot", requiring greater skill and a more consistent swing to make accurate, straight shots. Novice golfers with less consistent swing fundamentals can easily mishit these clubs, causing shots to launch or curve off of the intended line of play (such as "pushing", "pulling", "slicing" or "hooking").

A "muscle back" is also commonly referred to as "blade". The name "blade" can give golfers a better understanding of what type of club face they are hitting with. As mentioned with the "muscle back", these irons have rather smaller club faces and smaller sweet spots than cavity back irons. Most people understand a "blade" to be a very flat section of a device, which is why these smaller and "flatter" irons are referred to as "blades".

=== Cavity back ===
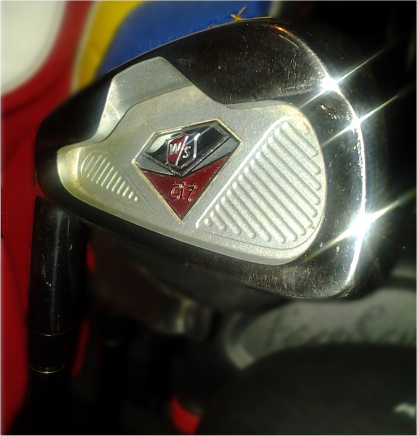
Cavity back style iron

Cavity back, or perimeter weighted, irons are usually made by investment casting, which creates a harder metal allowing thinner surfaces while retaining durability and also allows for more precise placement of metal than forging techniques. Cavity backs are so called because of the cavity created in the rear of the clubhead due to the removal of metal from the center of the clubhead's back, which is then redistributed, most of it very low and towards the toe and heel of the clubhead. This has the general effect of lowering the clubhead's center of mass, placing it underneath that of the ball allowing for a higher launch angle for a given loft. The perimeter weighting also increases the moment of inertia, making the clubhead more resistant to twisting on impact with the ball. The result is a clubhead with a larger "sweet spot" that is more forgiving of slight mishits.

=== Comparison and preference ===
Modern clubs generally borrow from both "muscle-back" and "cavity-back" design features and fall into a gradient.

Club sets with more extreme perimeter weighting, giving the clubhead a very wide sole, are typically known as "game improvement irons", because they allow novice and casual amateur players to get the ball up in the air more consistently, and make straighter and more accurate shots despite their less consistent ball-striking skill. This generally improves their final score as compared to a round played with harder-to-hit muscle-back designs causing more errant shots and thus more penalty strokes.

However, these same forgiving characteristics can make game improvement irons harder for a skilled golfer to use well. The tendency of the clubs to correct mishits will frustrate a golfer's attempts to intentionally hit a curved shot (a "fade" or "draw"), for instance to avoid an obstacle lying along a straight flight path, or to counter a rightward or leftward slope to the fairway that would make a straight shot roll into the rough. This lack of ability to "work the ball" can frustrate a more skilled golfer attempting to place the ball more accurately on the fairway than a novice would normally be concerned with (the novice's primary concern being simply to keep the ball on the fairway in the first place). The increased clubhead mass and lower center of mass can also be incompatible with a more skilled player's stronger swing; the higher mass reduces clubhead speed, while the higher launch angle causes more backspin and wastes the golfer's energy sending the ball up into the air instead of out over the fairway.

Clubs intended for skilled amateurs and professionals, while still incorporating some perimeter-weighting characteristics, generally have less extreme weight distribution, instead placing more weight closer to the center and higher, and reducing overall clubhead mass slightly. This allows the golfer to "work the ball" while still giving some advantage based on the lower center of mass as compared to older designs. The slightly reduced mass of some sets also increases clubhead speed allowing for more variation in swing strength and thus carry distance than would be possible with the heavier mass of most game improvement irons.

== Components ==
=== Clubhead ===
Investment casting, while allowing for a greater range of design options, produces a very stiff and inflexible head that can be difficult to adjust for a player's desired lie and loft. Forged irons, while they allow for easier and a greater range of adjustments, are limited in the designs that may be achieved.

The shaft length of an iron decreases as the iron's number increases; therefore, the iron number is inversely proportionate to its length. This reduced length means that a clubhead of the same mass traveling at the same angular velocity (degrees per second, as swung by a golfer) has lower momentum because the clubhead's speed is slower. To combat this, higher-numbered iron clubheads are heavier than lower-numbered iron heads; there is generally a 1/4-ounce (7 g) increase in mass between one clubhead and the next higher number.

Due to the average golfer's desire to hit the ball farther, the loft on modern irons is much less than that on irons from even the late 20th century. For example, a modern 9-iron has comparable loft to a 7-iron from the 1990s. Manufacturers have been able to reduce loft without compromising usability, by moving weight into the sole of the clubhead, thereby lowering the center of gravity and enabling the ball to be launched on a higher trajectory for a given loft than a design with a higher center of mass. Tour professionals now use these same de-lofted clubs, and so the gap in skill and thus in distance between a professional and casual golfer remains.

Over the years, groove technology has changed the playability of irons. For the past 80 years, little has changed about grooves. However, a new rule by the USGA and the R&A has changed the way that grooves are to be made starting in 2010. In general, the deeper the groove, the more grass can be dispersed behind the ball at impact. This allows control over the amount of spin, which is crucial to flight characteristics of the shot as well as how well received the ball is on the green. The less that is between the ball and the club at impact, the more spin that will be produced which, while decreasing launch trajectory, allows the ball to stop quicker upon hitting the green due to the spin limiting the balls rolling speed at impact. Better players benefit the most from deep, sharp grooves as the more clubhead speed is generated, the more spin the player is able to introduce. By forcing manufacturers to lessen the depth and cut on the grooves, the new rules will penalize shots from longer grass slightly more and put a premium on hitting the fairway.

==== Hosel ====
For irons, the hosel, an undefined part of the iron, is very noticeable, forming a barrel shape on the inside face of the club and the "heel" of the sole of the club. Many modern irons have a more offset hosel, integrated into the clubhead at a lower point and further from the hitting area of the club. This, combined with the perimeter weighting of modern irons, gives a club with the lowest possible center of gravity and the highest possible usable club face.

A stroke in which the ball comes directly off the hosel is known as a "shank", and the ball will usually veer off almost at right angles to the intended target line. A "shank" should be easy to identify when making contact with the ball. A "flushed" strike should feel really soft and light when making contact, while a "shanked" strike should almost sting the hands while feeling heavier than a flush.

=== Shaft ===
The shaft is the true engine of the iron. A shaft that is perfectly suited to the individual golfer increases distance and improves accuracy, while a poorly suited shaft can lead to inconsistent, wayward shots and reduced distance.

Although graphite shafts, made from composite materials such as carbon fiber, are now standard in woods, especially drivers, shafts for irons are still most often made from steel, which has lower torque than graphite, allowing less clubhead twisting, which gives better accuracy. Graphite shafts are not uncommon for numbered irons however, as the increased distance conferred by the shaft is advantageous to many players, especially shorter hitters such as ladies and seniors. Wedges virtually always have steel shafts as the accuracy and consistency is of primary importance.

In a standard set of irons, the higher the number of the iron, the shorter its shaft will be; this allows the player a more controlled and consistent swing with the shorter clubs. The resulting reduction in clubhead velocity is overcome by an increase in clubhead mass. In some sets, every iron has the same length shaft, which enables exactly the same swing to be used for each club; Bryson DeChambeau is one of very few professional tournament golfers to use such a set.

=== Grip ===
The grip covers the top of the shaft enabling the golfer to hold the club comfortably. Modern grips are generally made from rubber, sometimes inlaid with cord, but some players still prefer a traditional leather wrap. Even though materials advances have resulted in more durable, longer-lasting soft grips, they still require frequent replacement as they wear, dry out or harden.

By the rules of golf, all iron grips must have a circular cross-section. They may taper from thick to thin along their length (and virtually all do) but are not allowed to have any waisting (a thinner section of the grip surrounded by thicker sections above and below it) or bulges (thicker sections of the grip surrounded by thinner sections). Minor variations in surface texture (such as the natural variation of a "wrap"-style grip) are not counted unless significant.

== Types of irons ==
=== Numbered irons ===
Most irons in a player's bag are labelled with a number indicating their loft; the higher the number, the higher the loft. A matched set of irons will have a regular, progressive increase in loft through the irons, which may differ from set to set due to other design considerations that can affect launch angle and distance. Irons have been seen ranging in number from 0 through 12, but the most common number range in the modern iron set is 3 to 9.

==== Driving iron ====
The 1 iron, or driving iron, is the lowest lofted and longest iron (14 or 16 degrees of loft), although Wilson did make a 0 iron for John Daly. Often called a butter knife because of how it looks, the 1 iron has the least surface area on its face and so is commonly regarded as the most difficult club in the bag to hit. The driving iron is virtually obsolete as its nominal range easily falls into that of the easier-to-hit fairway woods, although some sets still include one and it can be purchased separately as a custom club. Lee Trevino is famously quoted, after he had been struck by lightning at the 1975 Western Open, that if he were out on the course and it began to storm again he would take out his 1 iron and point it to the sky, "because even God can't hit a 1 iron."

==== Long irons ====
The irons from 2 to 4 are typically called the "long irons"; they have the lowest lofts and the longest shafts, and are designed to hit the ball long distances (180-260 yards) with low launch angles. They are typically used from the fairway or rough, but are also useful in trouble spots such as when "punching out" from underneath a stand of trees.

Long irons are traditionally regarded as the most difficult to hit, because their low loft gives them a very small striking face and "sweet spot" compared to higher-lofted irons. As such, they are less commonly seen in players' bags, usually replaced with higher-lofted fairway woods like the 5 and 7, or with hybrid clubs that have similar overall performance but are easier to hit. The 2-iron, like the driving iron, is virtually never seen in modern sets, due to both its difficulty and to a "de-lofting" of modern cavity-backed irons which increases the average distance of shorter irons. If the long irons are used, they are often seen with graphite shafts to add additional clubhead speed to the average golfer's swing by storing energy from the downswing and releasing it at impact. Hybrid clubs that replace these irons also often have graphite shafts for the same reason.

The 5-iron sits on the cusp between "long" and "mid" irons, and can be thought of as belonging to either class depending on the set and the player's preference; it is used more often and replaced with a hybrid less often than the 2-4, but is still commonly replaced with a hybrid club, especially in ladies' sets.

==== Mid irons ====
The irons from 5 to 7 are typically called the "mid irons", and are generally used from the fairway and rough for longer approach shots, between 130 and 210 yards depending on the club, player and course. They are also used on hillier fairways to avoid hitting a low rise, which is a risk with long irons. These irons are commonly needed for the second shot of a long par-4 or the second or third shot of a par-5, and whenever the player must "lay up" their tee or second shot to avoid a hazard in range of their woods or long irons. Mid irons are common "bump and run" clubs in close-in situations where the player does not wish to hit a more lofted chip shot, but needs more rolling distance than a pitch or bump-and-run with a short iron would produce.

These irons are typically easier to hit well than the long irons, owing to their higher loft which gives the clubs more surface area. These clubs are more often found as true irons in players' bags, meaning they are less often replaced with hybrid clubs or other "iron replacements". These irons often have graphite shafts in newer sets, even when shorter irons have steel; the graphite will give better distance for the average golfer at the cost of some loss of consistency due to shaft torquing.

==== Short irons ====
The 8 and 9 irons are commonly called the "short irons". They have the highest-mass clubheads and the shortest shafts of the numbered irons, and are used for shots requiring high loft or moderate to short distance (typically between 130 and 150 yards with a full swing). Shots that must carry over tall or nearby obstacles such as a stand of trees, or approach shots from inside 140 yards of the pin, are common short iron situations. The short irons also make good "bump and run" clubs; used with a putting motion from the fringe around the green, the ball will carry in the air a few yards over the thick grass that would hamper a putt, then land softly on the green where it will then roll for a distance like a putt.

The short irons are traditionally regarded as the easiest to hit; however they are typically used in situations requiring very high accuracy, and so it becomes critical to minimize any effect of mis-hits. Short irons are often constructed using steel shafts, even if lower-lofted irons in the set have graphite; the steel minimizes clubhead torquing, increasing the consistency and thus accuracy of shots made at the cost of reduced flex which reduces distance (a secondary concern in most situations where these irons are used).

The pitching wedge is on the cusp between the short irons and the wedges, and has behaviors and uses falling into either class. Most matched iron sets include a pitching wedge, and it follows the normal loft progression of the iron set. In some sets, such as older sets produced by MacGregor Golf, it is labelled the 10-iron (MacGregor has since adopted the "P" terminology common to other manufacturers). In other sets such as Callaway Golf's "Big Bertha" line, the set includes a 10-iron in addition to a pitching wedge (simply labelled "W"), and the wedge's loft is increased from a nominal 45-48° to 50°, as a means to "close the gap" in lofts between a modern pitching wedge and a modern sand wedge.

=== Wedges ===
Wedges are a subclass of irons with higher loft than numbered irons, used for a variety of specialized "utility" shots that require short distance (typically less than 130 yards), high launch angle, or high backspin to reduce roll distance. The first wedge to have that name was the sand wedge, invented by Gene Sarazen in 1931, which features a wide sole that is angled complementary to the striking face to help prevent the clubhead digging into soft turf such as sand. This wide sole was added to other high-lofted irons to add mass to the clubhead (compensating for the shorter shafts) and gives wedges their name, alluding to the clubs' appearances in profile.

Wedges are used for approach shots to the putting green, getting the ball out of tough situations, and to escape from hazards. They are designed to produce a high, short trajectory with a high degree of spin, all of which cuts down on the distance the ball will roll after landing. Most golfers will generally have at least two wedges, traditionally a pitching wedge and a sand wedge, with a lob wedge or a gap wedge commonly being added to provide additional options. Wedges are usually identified by a letter denoting their function (P, G, S, L, etc. sometimes with a W appended), or depending on the manufacturer, with a number denoting their loft angle (52°, 56°, 60°) and "bounce angle" (0-12°).

- The pitching wedge is the lowest-lofted club typically called a wedge. It lies on the cusp between the numbered irons and the wedges (in fact it is sometimes labelled the "10-iron"), and is useful for a variety of short shots from firm or semi-soft lies. The traditional pitching wedge had a loft of about 50-52°, but the "de-lofting" of modern cavity back irons including the pitching wedge has resulted in a loft range centering on 48°.
- The gap wedge was created to fill the gap that appeared between the pitching wedge and the sand wedge, as the numbered irons including the pitching wedge were de-lofted to compensate for cavity-backed irons' higher launch angle. The gap wedge has a loft similar to that of an older pitching wedge, around 52°, and can also be found labelled as an "approach", "dual", "utility", or "attack" wedge. Originally designed with relatively low bounce for use from the fairway or other thinner lies, gap wedges, like many wedges, are now offered with different amounts of bounce to accommodate differing player techniques and preferences.
- The sand wedge or sand iron is primarily designed to "escape" out of sand bunkers and other soft lies, especially near the green. The traditional sand wedge is lofted between 54 and 56°, with about 10-12° of "bounce", allowing the clubhead to glide through sand and avoid digging in. Traditionally it has one of the widest soles of any wedge to give the greatest amount of upward force to help produce a smooth swing just underneath the top layer of sand, though some modern designs produce acceptable upward lift with narrower soles.
- The lob wedge has a high degree of loft, typically from 58-60°, designed to produce shots with a very high arc, and are most often used for shots over hazards and other obstructions, or to accurately "drop" the ball into tight pin positions on modern elevated, undulating greens.
  - A speciality lob wedge of 62-64°, sometimes referred to an ultra lob wedge, are an alternative to a lob wedge for speciality shots, generally where a higher-trajectory shot is required, or where less bounce is required, such as when playing from hardpan bunkers or tight lies. Generally recommended only to skilled golfers for specialist purposes. Phil Mickelson is known to carry a 64º wedge.

The use of lettered symbols on wedges (especially those not sold as part of a matching set) are becoming less common. Most wedges sold individually today are instead labelled with some combination of their loft angle in degrees, their bounce angle either in degrees or in a "low-medium-high" marking system, and an indication of the "sole grind", variations of which make the club more suitable for different types of shots. This system allows more flexibility in club selection and use, as one player might consider a club of a particular angle for a different basic job than the majority of players would. For instance, a player might regard both a 50° and a 54° wedge in their bag as gap wedges, and so choose clubs with lower bounce angles, then add a 58° wedge with more bounce to use out of most sandy lies. Another golfer might instead want the 54° wedge as their sand wedge and choose one with higher bounce, then use the 58° as a "lob wedge" and choose a low bounce angle to allow it to be used from a variety of ground conditions near the green. A third golfer, playing with a highly de-lofted pitching wedge like 44°, might even carry five wedges, for instance 48°, 52°, 56° and 60° angled wedges in addition to the pitching wedge.

Given the choices available to the modern golfer, and further de-lofting of pitching wedges (and all other irons) in the newest iron sets, it is almost unheard of anymore for a player to have only a pitching wedge and sand wedge. Gap wedges are ubiquitous in the modern club set, and sets of four total wedges are becoming more and more common. This usually comes at the cost of having to remove other clubs, often the long irons, from the bag in order to meet the 14-club limit; with a driver and two fairway irons or hybrids, for a player to have four wedges, they must start their numbered irons at the four-iron instead of the three. This in turn requires more attention paid to the selection of fairway woods or hybrids to produce more evenly-distributed average distances between the driver and the long to mid irons.

== Hybrids ==
Hybrid golf clubs are a relatively new idea in the game of golf, with more and more people adding them to their golf bag each year. Hybrids are designed to give golfers the control and accuracy of an iron, while also adding the distance of a more traditional "wood". Hybrids are designed with a higher degree of loft than most fairway woods, giving it a similar feel to the average iron. This higher degree of loft gets the golf ball airborne quicker to give golfers more options when hitting a challenging shot. The most common hybrids are 3-7 hybrids which correspond to different shaft length and loft angles

=== Key Features of hybrids ===
- More forgiveness - Easier to hit than long irons.
- Higher launch - The ball gets airborne more quickly.
- Versatility - Can be hit from fairways, rough, or off the tee.
- Better Distance Control - More consistent than low numbered long irons.

=== 3 Hybrid ===
The 3 hybrid has the least amount of loft when referring to the 3-7 hybrid. Which means when the club is behind the ball, it will look flatter than a higher lofted hybrid. This club can be related to a 3 iron, except has a slightly longer shaft and the ball travels 15-20 yards farther.

=== 7 Hybrid ===
The 7 hybrid has the most loft when referring to the 3-7 hybrid. This club is similar to a 7 iron, except with a slightly longer shaft and also traveling 15-20 yards farther than a normal iron would go.

Jooste, C., & Joostehttps://www.golfspan.com/author/charl-jooste, C. (2023, November 6). What are hybrid golf clubs & how do they differ?. Golf Span - Golf Tips and Equipment Reviews. https://www.golfspan.com/what-are-hybrid-golf-clubs

=== Specifications ===
The following table provides a guide to the typical specifications of modern cavity-back irons. This is a guide only, there are no standards and specifications vary by manufacturer and custom-fitting option specifications.

Iron	1	2	3	4	5	6	7	8	9	PW	AW	SW	LW	ULW
Loft (Note: Standard loft angles vary slightly between models of club.)	14°	17°	20°	23°	26°	29°	33°	37°	41°	45°	50°	55°	60°	64°
Lie (Note: Different golfers require lie angles that may be as much as +/- 3 degrees from the standard ones listed.)	59.5°	60°	60.5°	61°	61.5°	62°	62.5°	63°	64°	65°	65°	65°	65°	65°
Length (in) (Note: Standard lengths. Golfers may have different shaft lengths to suit their game.)	40.0	39.5	39.0	38.5	38.0	37.5	37.0	36.5	36.0	35.5	35.5	35.25	35.0	35.0
Length (cm)	101	100	99.1	97.8	96.5	95.3	94.0	92.7	91.4	90.2	90.2	89.5	88.9	88.9

The following table provides a guide to the typical specifications of muscle-back (blade) irons and early cavity irons through to the mid-1980s.

Iron	1	2	3	4	5	6	7	8	9	PW	SW
Loft	17°	20°	24°	28°	32°	36°	40°	44°	48°	52°	56°
Lie	55°	56°	57°	58°	59°	60°	61°	62°	63°	63°	63°
Length (in)	39.0	38.5	38.0	37.5	37.0	36.5	36.0	35.5	35.0	35.0	35.0
Length (cm)	99.1	97.8	96.5	95.3	94.0	92.7	91.4	90.2	88.9	88.9	88.9

==== Lie Angle ====
The lie angle of an iron is often adjusted to fit a golfer's swing so that the head of the club is in the right position at impact. Most club manufacturers offer customized lie angles between 2° flat and 2° upright. If an iron lie is too upright it can cause a shot to miss to the left for a right handed golfer (or right for a left handed golfer) and if the lie angle is too flat, it can cause a shot to miss to the right for a right handed golfer (or left for a left handed golfer).

== See also ==
- Obsolete golf clubs
