= Sand wedge =

Type of golf club

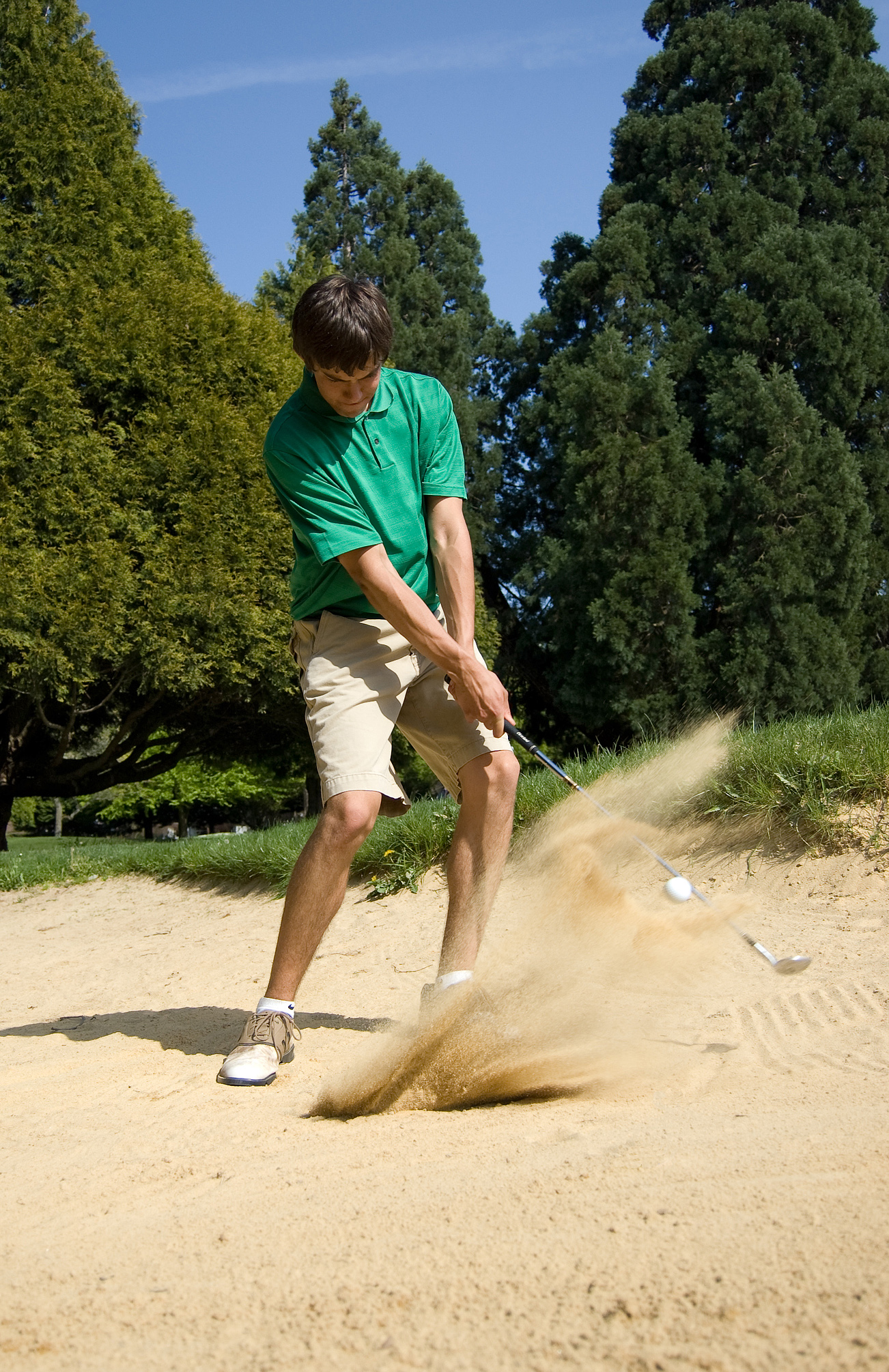
A golfer uses a sand wedge to hit the ball from a green-side bunker.

A sand wedge, or sand iron, is a type of golf club, an open-faced wedge primarily designed for getting out of sand bunkers. It has the widest sole of any wedge, which provides the greatest amount of bounce, allowing the club head to glide through sand and avoid digging in. After Gene Sarazen had success in 1932 with a new club that he had invented for sand play, its popularity quickly grew. The club can be advantageous in other soft lies—such as thick rough, soggy ground, or mud—and is also used from firmer grass lies for lobs or chips.

== History ==
Clubs with the loft of the sand wedge can be traced as far back as Young Tom Morris, who used a "rut iron" for play from troublesome lies. Such irons were, however, traditional in construction, without the wider, heavier sole featured on the modern sand wedge.

Gene Sarazen began to win tournaments in 1932 with a new club he had invented that was specialized for sand play. He is hailed as the inventor of the sand wedge, though its history goes about 4 years further back than that. Spoon clubs offered varying degrees of loft and allowed players to scoop their ball out of sand traps and deep rough. As manufacturers became more and more innovative with club design, new types of wedges appeared. Some had concave faces, others featured deeply grooved faces, but not all of these designs conformed to USGA and R&A regulations, and many were banned. With the concave-faced wedge having been outlawed in 1931, Sarazen designed his sand wedge with a straight face. Another modification that he made was to add extra lead to the front edge of the club face, allowing it to cut through the sand more smoothly. After he won the 1932 British and U.S. Opens with the help of his new club, its popularity vastly grew.

== Design ==
The modern sand wedge is often the heaviest iron in a player's bag, with most weighing nearly 16 oz (470 grams). Traditionally it also had the highest loft at 56 degrees (55–56 being most common), although that distinction now goes to the lob wedge, which often has a loft of 60 degrees or more. It usually has one of the shortest shafts, between 33 inches (84 cm) and 36 inches (91 cm), though in some sets the sand wedge has a longer shaft than the pitching wedge.

=== Bounce ===
The main distinguishing difference of the club from most others, however, is a feature called bounce. On most other irons, the sole of the club is perpendicular to the shaft, meaning it is roughly parallel to the ground when the club is at rest, allowing the leading edge to get between the ball and the ground more easily. A sand wedge however is designed with the sole of the club at an angle to the ground in the same position, lifting the leading edge of the club off the ground. This design accomplishes three things:

First, this design generally requires more material, which increases the weight of the club head for more momentum and places that weight low and forward in the club head for higher launches.

Second, the angled sole lifts the leading edge off the ground at the bottom of the swing, preventing the club from digging in to softer lies—e.g., sand, muddy ground, and thick grass—instead tending to skim over the surface. This in turn allows players more flexibility when addressing the ball; the player can line the ball up in the centre of their stance and take a normal swing in which the club will skim over the turf before contact with the ball, or alternatively they can move the ball rearward in their stance (towards the right foot for a right-handed player) and strike the ball earlier in the swing. The natural consequence of such a correctly executed shot is that the club face has less loft at contact, so the ball is launched at a lower angle for more distance. Without bounce, such a shot will generally cause the club to dig into the ground after it contacts the ball, even if executed correctly. With such a high-lofted club, the player is prevented from following through on their swing and can be injured.

Lastly, when playing from a bunker, the ball may have buried itself deeply into the sand (depending on the sand's consistency and the degree of impact, the ball may be completely submerged). To lift it out, the club head must contact the ball from underneath, meaning the leading edge of the club must sometimes be 1 or 2 inches (3 or 5 cm) under the surface of the sand at contact. The angle of the sole counteracts the natural downward pressure of the club face digging itself ever deeper into the sand, making it easier to swing the club down under the surface of the sand and then lift the club—and the ball—back out again.

Other clubs, especially short irons and other wedges, now incorporate a small degree of bounce to assist in plays from the rough or other soft lies, but the sand wedge will typically have the highest amount of bounce of any club in a player's bag. There are however exceptions; Callaway Golf for instance markets a "Big Bertha" line of irons in which the lob wedge has significantly higher bounce than the sand wedge.

== Usage ==
As its name suggests, a sand wedge is used most often to extract the ball from a sand bunker. However, the features which make it useful for this purpose are advantageous in other soft lies such as thick rough, soggy ground, or mud. It is also used from firmer grass lies for lobs or chips, generally onto the green. It can also be used as any other short iron would; with a full swing, a skilled golfer can typically hit a sand wedge between 80–100 yards (70–90 m). Tour players often use a lob wedge (60° wedge) to get out of bunkers with controlled trajectory and much spin.
