= Pitching wedge =

Type of golf club

A pitching wedge is a wedge used to hit a shot with higher and shorter trajectory than a 9-iron and a lower and longer trajectory than a gap wedge.

== Design/history ==
Though technically a wedge, pitching wedges are generally treated as if they were numbered irons. This is for a number of reasons: first, before the term "wedge" became common for high-loft short irons, the pitching wedge was actually numbered as the "10-iron" of a matched set, and to this day it follows the normal loft progression of the numbered irons. Also, even though it has been named a wedge, many matched iron sets for retail sale include the pitching wedge even when not including other wedges. Finally, the loft of modern irons has been reduced compared to older designs. This is both to compensate for cavity-back iron designs that launch the ball higher for a given loft, and to increase the distance carried by each club for the average golfer's clubhead speed. (Professionals now also use similar designs, preserving the gap in hitting distance between the amateur golfer and the pro.) As a result the loft of the pitching wedge decreased along with the numbered irons from a traditional loft of between 48–54° to between 45–50°, similar to that of an older 8-iron. Many pitching wedges have a loft close to 50°.

== Use ==
The pitching wedge is a very versatile club. Being on the cusp between numbered irons and wedges, the pitching wedge has generally accepted uses falling into either class. Used with a "full swing" similar to a short iron, a golfer can produce a high-trajectory shot that carries between 80–130 yards (73–119 m) (depending on a variety of factors such as swing and club design), then "bites" with little or no roll after initial impact. Used with an abbreviated "chipping" motion, the club can produce short (25–45 yd (23–41 m)) "lob" or "approach" shots. And with a "putting" motion, the club can lift the ball over rough or fringe onto the putting green from a short distance to the pin (10–25 yd (9.1–22.9 m)). This last kind of stroke is commonly called a "bump and run" and can be done with many other irons, generally with a loft equal or higher than a 7-iron.

These clubs are most commonly used with a full swing to produce high-altitude shots such as approaches to the green or lifting the ball over trees. They are also commonly used to "lay up" in front of a hazard or to create a better lie for the next shot, and for recovery from firmer rough or sometimes from sand when the ball is lying on top of the surface. The loft of a particular pitching wedge follows the progression of the numbered irons of the same set, and these sets can have subtle differences in the loft progression and starting loft of the set, so the loft of pitching wedges can vary widely between sets. The loft of a pitching wedge generally falls between 42 and 49 degrees, but the launch angle and the average carry distance of the club between sets are typically similar. Pitching wedges can also have between zero and 10 degrees of bounce, though most pitching wedges have very low bounce (only 2 or 3 degrees) as other wedges like gap wedges or sand wedges are more traditionally suited for play out of hazards or soft lies where high bounce is desired.

== See also ==
- Golf glossary
