= Wilson Staff =

Golf equipment manufacturer

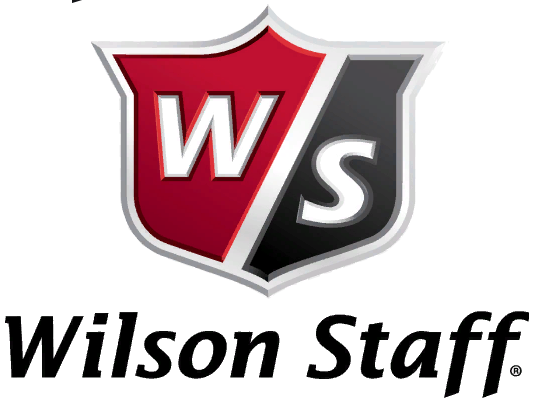
- Type: Division
- Industry: Sports equipment
- Founded: 1914; 112 years ago
- Headquarters: Chicago, Illinois, US
- Products: Golf balls, clubs, gloves, bags, polo shirts
- Parent: Wilson Sporting Goods
- Website: wilson.com/golf

Wilson Staff is Wilson Sporting Goods's premium golf brand aimed at touring golf professionals and serious golf players. Wilson designs and manufactures a full range of golf equipment, accessories, and apparel using the Wilson Staff, Wilson, ProStaff, Profile, Ultra and Hope brands. Wilson's other lines are generally considered to be "big box store," "value," or "economy" brands, while the Wilson Staff line provides higher quality equipment used on all major professional golf tours.

Products marketed under the Wilson Staff brand include golf equipment such as golf balls, golf clubs, golf gloves, and golf bags, and golf-oriented clothing (such as polo shirts).

Many of the world's top professional golfers have used Wilson equipment, including Gene Sarazen (who had a 75-year relationship with the company, the longest-running contract in sports history). Professional golfers who have used Wilson Staff equipment include Sam Snead, Walter Hagen, Arnold Palmer, Patty Berg, Nick Faldo, John Daly, Ben Crenshaw, Vijay Singh, and Payne Stewart. Palmer and Crenshaw both used Wilson 8802 putters, with Crenshaw even naming his putter Little Ben due to his proficiency with it. Current Wilson Staff players include Open and USPGA pro players Pádraig Harrington and Brendan Steele.

== History ==
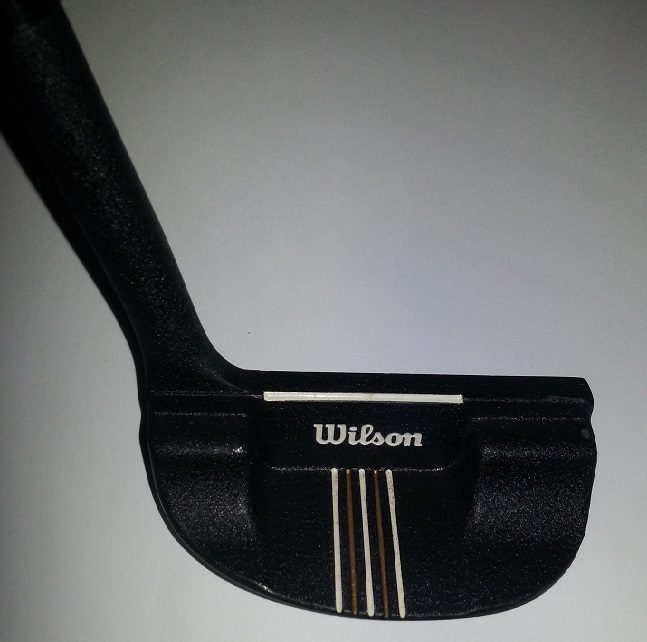
TPA XVIII putter

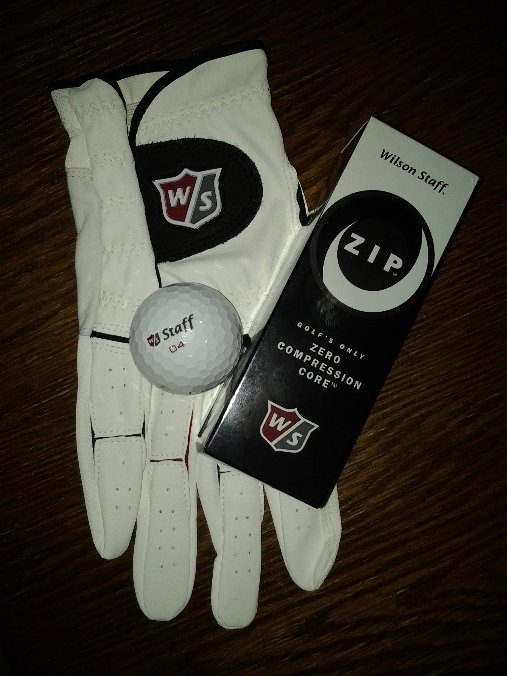
Golf glove, and balls

In 1932 Wilson Advisory staff member Gene Sarazen was inspired by the aerodynamics of an airplane's wing to create a club head that would glide smoothly through sand. Sarazen welded a piece of steel to the sole of the club and ground it producing 'bounce'. This marked the introduction of the sand wedge and in 1933 alone, Wilson sold 50,000 of these clubs, marketed as the R-90, which went on to be the most popular sand wedge in golf.

In 1933 Wilson Advisory Staff member Willie Ogg created a design for distributing weight away from the heel of the club head, moving it towards the "sweet spot" of the blade. This design feature was used in the Wilson Ogg-mented irons, the forerunner of perimeter weighted or cavity back irons.

In 1948, then Wilson Sporting Goods President Lawrence Icely provided the financial backing for Patty Berg and Babe Didrikson Zaharias to form the Women’s PGA, predecessor of today's LPGA.

In 1954 Wilson began producing the Wilson Staff ball which was seen as revolutionary due to its ability to launch up to 40 percent faster than the golf club's head speed. In 2005 Wilson Staff claims to be the first golf company to utilize nanotechnology in golf equipment.

== Major championships ==
Wilson Staff claims that its line of irons has "more majors won than any other brand." Players using Wilson Staff clubs have won a total of 62 majors.

Year	Tournament	Winner
1922	U. S. Open	Gene Sarazen
1922	PGA Championship	Gene Sarazen
1923	PGA Championship	Gene Sarazen
1928	U. S. Open	Johnny Farrell
1932	The Open Championship	Gene Sarazen
1932	U. S. Open	Gene Sarazen
1933	PGA Championship	Gene Sarazen
1935	The Masters	Gene Sarazen
1935	PGA Championship	Johnny Revolta
1936	PGA Championship	Denny Shute
1937	PGA Championship	Denny Shute
1937	U.S. Open	Ralph Guldahl
1938	U. S. Open	Ralph Guldahl
1939	The Masters	Ralph Guldahl
1941	PGA Championship	Vic Ghezzi
1942	PGA Championship	Sam Snead
1946	U. S. Open	Lloyd Mangrum
1946	The Open Championship	Sam Snead
1947	PGA Championship	Jim Ferrier
1948	The Masters	Claude Harmon
1949	The Masters	Sam Snead
1949	U. S. Open	Cary Middlecoff
1949	PGA Championship	Sam Snead
1952	The Masters	Sam Snead
1952	U. S. Open	Julius Boros
1954	The Masters	Sam Snead
1955	The Masters	Cary Middlecoff
1956	U. S. Open	Cary Middlecoff
1958	The Masters	Arnold Palmer
1959	The Masters	Art Wall Jr.
1959	U. S. Open	Billy Casper

Year	Tournament	Winner
1960	The Masters	Arnold Palmer
1960	U. S. Open	Arnold Palmer
1961	The Open Championship	Arnold Palmer
1962	The Masters	Arnold Palmer
1962	The Open Championship	Arnold Palmer
1963	U. S. Open	Julius Boros
1965	PGA Championship	Dave Marr
1966	U. S. Open	Billy Casper
1968	PGA Championship	Julius Boros
1969	The Masters	George Archer
1970	The Masters	Billy Casper
1974	U. S. Open	Hale Irwin
1976	U. S. Open	Jerry Pate
1976	The Open Championship	Johnny Miller
1978	U. S. Open	Andy North
1979	U. S. Open	Hale Irwin
1981	The Open Championship	Bill Rogers
1984	The Masters	Ben Crenshaw
1985	The Masters	Bernhard Langer
1985	U. S. Open	Andy North
1989	PGA Championship	Payne Stewart
1990	U. S. Open	Hale Irwin
1991	U. S. Open	Payne Stewart
1993	The Masters	Bernhard Langer
1995	The Open Championship	John Daly
1998	PGA Championship	Vijay Singh
1999	The Open Championship	Paul Lawrie
2007	The Open Championship	Pádraig Harrington
2008	The Open Championship	Pádraig Harrington
2008	PGA Championship	Pádraig Harrington
2019	U. S. Open	Gary Woodland

== Sponsorship deals ==
In the past, Wilson has had many of the world best golfers under contract, including six-time major winner Nick Faldo and three-time major winner Pádraig Harrington. Wilson Staff currently has endorsement deals with many professional golfers who compete on all the major tours.

Wilson Staff also has sponsorship deals with Brendan Steele, Kevin Tway, Kevin Streelman, Kevin Kisner and Trey Mullinax.
