= Gap wedge =

Wedge in golf

In golf, a gap wedge, also known as an approach wedge, is a wedge used to hit a shot with higher and shorter trajectory than a pitching wedge and lower and longer trajectory than a sand wedge. The name derives from the club's design to fill the "gap" between sand and pitching wedges.

== History ==
Over time the loft angle on irons in matched sets has been reduced for multiple reasons. Manufacturers, always wanting to advertise longer distances than their competitors, sometimes "cheat" by de-lofting their iron sets by a degree or two compared to their competitor's set, producing between 2-5 yards of extra distance per degree of "strengthening". In addition, several significant advances in clubhead design, most notably the 1970s development of investment-cast "cavity-back" designs, and the 1990s introduction of clubfaces that increased backspin to improve "bite", resulted in clubs with higher launch angles and flight paths for the same loft angle than their predecessors. Clubmakers then compensated for this in both cases by reducing loft, to translate that higher flight path into greater distance. Currently, the pitching wedge of a typical matched iron set has a loft similar to a 9-iron from the 1980s, at about 46 degrees, and much stronger lofts are found in game improvement sets.

However, sand wedges generally have not received this same reduction in loft, even as they were designed with similar weight-distribution and backspin-improving features. This is because the sand wedge is typically not used with distance in mind; its eponymous purpose requires the traditional 54-56° loft angle in order to dig into the soft sand surrounding the ball and lift it out. The sand wedge's nominal loft and "bounce" angles have not changed appreciably from Gene Sarazen's original concept based on the niblick. Cavity-backed, perimeter-weighted sets may de-loft this club by a degree or two compared to a forged set, but this is nowhere near the amount of loft reduction seen in the numbered irons. This leaves a "gap" in loft angle between the pitching and sand wedges of up to 10 degrees, causing a distance difference with a full swing of up to 30 yards, both of which are differences normally seen between irons two or more loft numbers apart (e.g., between a 7 and 9 iron) instead of "adjacent" lofts as the PW and SW traditionally are.

As a result, some players who had upgraded to these newer de-lofted iron sets began carrying the pitching wedge of an older set, lofted around 50-52°, to "fill the gap". This additional wedge, with a full swing, falls between the average distances of a sand and pitching wedge, allowing the player to fine-tune their approach shot's distance without needing excessive variations in swing speed. Clubmakers, sensing an opportunity, began to offer a purpose-built wedge in this general loft range starting in the early to middle 1990s. These have become known colloquially as "gap wedges" due to their origin, despite various proprietary names applied to wedges in this class by their manufacturers.

== Design ==
Gap wedges are loosely defined, but typically have the loft between that of a pitching wedge and sand wedge, between 50 and 54 degrees. At the extremes there is redundancy with either the pitching wedge (typically 48°) or the sand wedge (typically 56°), however some players will "fine-tune" the lofts of these other wedges to their play style, leading to alternate loft choices for a gap wedge. Most players look for a separation of 4 degrees between clubs, and so with the standard pitching and sand wedge lofts, the complementary gap wedge would be 52°.

Within the range of lofts seen in gap wedges, the angle that the sole makes to the ground at address, also known as the club's "bounce angle", varies from 0° up to 12° or more. Lower lofts typically benefit from a lower bounce angle, suiting their use as effectively an "11-iron" for shots from firmer lies such as grass. Higher lofts, generally used from softer lies where the ball may have dug itself in more, require a higher bounce similar to the sand wedge to dig in and then lift back out of the ground. The most common 52° wedge is sold in a wide range of bounce angles; 8° is a common "medium bounce" choice, allowing the golfer to use the club in a variety of lies, from the fairway or rough to "fried egg" semi-embedded sand or mud situations.

The relation between actual loft and bounce can change based on how the player addresses the ball; the more forward the ball, and the more open the clubface, the higher the effective loft and bounce angles. Some clubmakers will vary the amount of bounce that the sole has from toe to heel, allowing the player to fine-tune the club to the specific situation by opening it. When square at address, such a club behaves more like a lower-bounce pitching wedge, while when opened, the club behaves more like a sand wedge (without the bounce becoming too high and making a "skulled" shot more likely, as it would with a constant bounce angle from tow to heel). A few manufacturers call attention to this by labeling the wedge "D" for "dual wedge", indicating it can be used as either a pitching or sand wedge (or anything in between).

There is little consistency in labeling gap wedges; most manufacturers simply label the wedge with its angle, optionally including additional information about the amount of bounce (sometimes the angle measure, more often a series of one to three dots indicating "low", "medium" and "high" bounce). Some manufacturers call it an "Approach", "Attack" or "All" wedge, labeling it in these cases with "A". The Karsten Manufacturing Company, maker of the Ping brand of golf clubs, favored the use of "U" for "utility wedge", but currently only uses this label on wedges sold in matched sets; most individual Ping wedges are currently labelled with their angle. It is actually uncommon to find a gap wedge labeled "G"; Adams Golf, Cobra, Mizuno, and Wilson are among the few manufacturers that do so.

== Controversy ==
The necessity of the gap wedge is contested by some golfers and clubfitters, who assert that this additional wedge would not be necessary if clubmakers had not de-lofted the clubs in the first place as a marketing move, to attract amateurs looking for more distance from each number. In addition, many matched sets do not include a gap wedge, when most clubmakers have included the pitching wedge since irons first began to be offered as matched numbered sets in the 1930s. The end result, critics claim, is that the 3 and 4-iron of a matched set have become just as hard to hit as the 1 and 2-irons of the 1970s, and with the average golfer carrying a set numbered between 4-iron and gap wedge, clubmakers might as well simply reduce all their labelled loft numbers by one, making the pitching wedge a 9-iron and the gap wedge a pitching wedge. Instead, most clubmakers continue to include the 3-iron and exclude the gap wedge from matched sets, which forces golfers to buy a 3-iron they are extremely unlikely to ever use, while not getting the much more important gap wedge and so having to buy it individually.

For their part, clubmakers contest that the modern golfer demands customization; wedges (including gap wedges) are available in many combinations of loft and bounce angle, allowing the player to choose exactly the combination they find most useful. Including a 52-degree mid-bounce wedge in a matched set may prove useless to a golfer who prefers a different loft or bounce than this standard offering. They also contend that, adjusting for inflation ($1.00 in 1970 would have the same buying power as $6.13 in 2014), the price of a matched iron set has decreased over this time period, even as design and manufacturing advances have genuinely increased the distance and accuracy that the average golfer can expect, compared to a club of an older design but similar launch angle. They also assert that these design advances have made the modern long irons easier to hit well than older generations, so golfers should at least try these long irons before removing them from the bag. Lastly, some manufacturers do in fact include a gap wedge as part of a matched iron set, often removing the 3 iron to provide the same overall number of clubs in the set (and in response to the concern about including such a difficult-to-use club). Ping, for instance, offers its G-series iron sets in two loft ranges, 3-PW and 4-UW.
