= Big Bertha (golf club) =

Golf club manufactured by Callaway Golf

Big Bertha is the name given by Callaway Golf to a number of its lines of golf clubs. The name was chosen to evoke the famous German Big Bertha howitzer.

The original Big Bertha driver was launched in 1991. At the time, its design was considered highly modern and a radical departure from older drivers: it was crafted entirely of stainless steel and the head had a volume of 190 cm^{3} (12 cu in). Most other drivers were still made of persimmon wood and had smaller heads. (By way of comparison, many drivers of recent years have head sizes up to the USGA legal maximum of 460 cm^{3} (28 cu in) and are made of more exotic materials such as titanium.)

Since the introduction of the original Big Bertha, Callaway has introduced further clubs and lines of clubs with similar names, such as the "Great Big Bertha", the "Biggest Big Bertha", and titanium versions of the clubs. In 2003, they introduced the "Great Big Bertha II," and in 2004, the "Big Bertha 454." They have also introduced two lines of irons using the name.
