= List of golf courses in North Dakota =

This list of golf courses in North Dakota in the U.S. state of North Dakota.

== Golf courses in North Dakota ==
- Apple Creek Country Club – Bismarck
- Apple Grove Grove Golf Course – Minot
- Birchwood Golf Course – Lake Metigoshe – Bottineau (closed)
- Black Sands Golf Course – Beulah
- Bois de Sioux Golf Course – Wahpeton and Breckenridge, Minnesota
- Bully Pulpit Golf Course – Medora
- Cooperstown Country Club – Cooperstown
- Crossroads Golf Club – Carrington
- Dakota Winds Golf Course, Hankinson
- Devils Lake Town and Country Club – Devils Lake
- Eagle Ridge Golf Club – Williston
- Edgewater Country Club – New Town
- Edgewood Golf Course – Fargo
- Ellendale Country Club – Ellendale
- El Zagal Golf Course - Fargo
- Fair Oakes Golf Club – Grafton
- Fargo Country Club – Fargo
- Garrison Golf Course – Garrison
- Goose River Golf Club – Hillsboro
- Grand Forks Country Club – Grand Forks
- Harvey Country Club – Harvey
- Hawktree Golf Club – Bismarck
- Heart River Golf Course – Dickinson
- Hettinger Country Club – Hettinger
- Hillcrest Country Club – Park River
- Jamestown Country Club – Jamestown
- King's Walk Golf Course – Grand Forks
- LaMoure Memorial Golf Club – Pembina
- Leonard Country Club - Leonard
- Links of North Dakota at Red Mike Resort – Williston
- Linton Country Club – Linton
- Mandan Municipal Golf Course – Mandan
- Maple River Golf Club, Inc. – Mapleton
- Memorial Park Country Club – LaMoure
- Napoleon Country Club – Napoleon
- North Portal Golf Course – Portal
- Osgood Golf Course – Fargo
- Oxbow Golf and Country Club – Oxbow
- Pebble Creek Golf Course – Bismarck
- Pheasant Country Golf Course – South Heart
- Prairie West Golf Course – Mandan
- Prairiewood Golf Course – Fargo
- Ray Golf Course – Ray
- Ray Richards Golf Course – Grand Forks
- Rugby Golf Club – Rugby
- Riverwood Golf Course – Bismarck
- Rose Creek Golf Course – Fargo
- Souris Valley Golf Course – Minot
- Star City Golf Course – Velva
- Tioga Golf and Country Club – Tioga
- Tom O'Leary Golf Course – Bismarck
- Valley City Town and Country Club - Valley City
- Vardon Golf Club (formerly Minot Country Club) – Minot
- Watford City Golf Club – Watford City
- Westridge Golf Course – Underwood
- Williston Municipal Golf Course – Williston
