= Wedge (golf) =

Type of golf club used in special situations

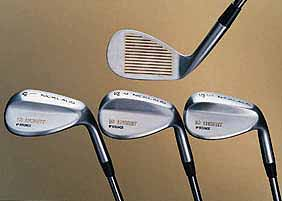
Some wedges

In the sport of golf, a wedge is a subset of the iron family of golf clubs designed for special use situations. As a class, wedges have the highest lofts, the shortest shafts, and the heaviest clubheads of the irons. These features generally aid the player in making accurate short-distance "lob" shots, to get the ball onto the green or out of a hazard or other tricky spot. In addition, wedges are designed with modified soles that aid the player in moving the clubhead through soft lies, such as sand, mud, and thick grass, to extract a ball that is embedded or even buried. Wedges come in a variety of configurations, and are generally grouped into four categories: pitching wedges, sand wedges, gap/approach wedges and lob wedges.

== History ==
The class of wedges grew out of the need for a better club for playing soft lies and short shots. Prior to the 1930s, the best club for short "approach" shots was the "niblick", roughly equivalent to today's 9-iron or pitching wedge in loft; however the design of this club, with a flat, angled face and virtually no "sole", made it difficult to use in sand and other soft lies as it was prone to dig into soft turf. The club most often used for bunker shots was called the "jigger"; it was used similarly to today's pitching wedge, and had a similar short shaft, but its loft was closer to the "mashie" of the day (equivalent to today's 4-iron). The lower loft reduced the club's tendency to 'dig in' to soft lies, but the low launch angle and high resistance through the sand made recovering a buried ball from a bunker very difficult. This club was also unsuitable for approach shots from bunkers near the green, as chip shot tended to roll extensively, making it difficult to control distance.

The modern sand wedge, the first of the clubs to be called a wedge, was developed by Gene Sarazen after flying in Howard Hughes' private plane. Sarazen noticed the flaps on the wings that were lowered on takeoff to help create lift, and surmised that the same could be done to a high-lofted golf club to help the clubhead cut through and then lift out of the sand (bringing the ball with it). He built his first prototype in 1931 by taking a niblick and soldering extra lead to its sole to add mass, then adjusting the angle of the sole to about 10 degrees from level with the ground, which he found to be the optimal angle to prevent the clubhead either digging deeply into the sand or skimming (bouncing) along the top. The resulting clubhead profile was roughly wedge-shaped as opposed to the blade-like style of high-lofted irons, hence the name. He brought his new club to compete in the 1932 British Open, but kept it hidden from the authorities to avoid having it ruled illegal. He won that tournament with a then-record score of 283 (the sum of four rounds of play), and also won the subsequent 1932 U.S. Open with a final-round score of 66 that would stand as a tournament record for almost 30 years.

Sarazen's new club, including the wide, angled sole, was ruled legal by both R&A and USGA authorities, and the club itself and its basic design concepts became widely copied by other golfers and by club manufacturers. As irons became more standardized in the 20s through the 40s, the wide sole of the sand wedge was copied on other mid- and high-lofted irons to add mass, which compensates for the progressively shorter shaft lengths to provide a similar feel across all the irons with a given swing. The highest-lofted irons got the most additional weight, resulting in the widest soles, giving these clubs the same eponymous wedge-shaped profile as the sand wedge. This led to the tradition of calling these high-lofted irons "wedges", regardless of the amount of bounce (angle of the sole to the ground) that the sole provided.

Wedges, and the golfer's "short game", have come to be emphasized by pro players and teachers/coaches as an area of critical importance. By simple math, with par for a hole based on 2 putts, and at least one additional stroke needed to get the ball on the green, a scratch golfer will take up to 54 strokes on a typical par-72 course with the intention of getting on the green and/or in the hole; only about a third of the strokes taken in a round will be with a wood or long iron with the main intent being distance. In cases where the player doesn't make "green in regulation" (meaning the ball is not on the green with two strokes left for putts), shots normally taken as putts must instead be used to approach, and so must be very accurate in direction and distance in order to set the ball up for a one-putt par (the chip shot and putt combination is called an "up and down") or even a birdie or eagle made with the chip shot itself. Even touring professionals miss an average of 6 GIRs in a round, making chip shots and other close-in strokes typically made with wedges that much more important.

As a result, since the mid-80s the number of wedges available to players has grown from 2 (pitching and sand) to 5 (adding gap, lob and ultra lob), most of which are now available in a wide array of lofts and bounces to allow a player to "fine-tune" their short game with the wedges that best meet their needs. In some cases, with the high degree of customization, companies have done away with the traditional names for each club, and instead simply label each club with its loft and bounce angles. A 52-8 wedge, for example, would have 52 degrees of loft and 8 degrees of bounce, generally placing it in the "gap wedge" class. Most players carry three or four wedges on the course, and sometimes more, usually sacrificing one or two of their long irons and/or higher-lofted fairway woods to meet the 14-club limit.

Newer designs of wedges, especially the sand wedge, have changed the shape of the sole slightly to reduce the bounce along the heel (hosel side) and provide a more curved leading edge. This newer shape allows for the golfer to "open" the clubface for short, high-backspin chip shots that "stick" on the green or even roll backwards, without the wide heel lifting the bottom edge of the club at address or the additional angle providing too much bounce.

Recently, a ruling by the USGA and R&A to ban the sale of wedges with backspin-increasing 'square' grooves (but grandfathered certain existing designs) accelerated revenues from wedge sales as golfers rushed to acquire designs incorporating these grooves before the ban took effect. Sales peaked in 2010 with a 23% revenue increase, and wedge prices inflated to a record $97 (from a nominal price of between $25 and $75 per club).

== Pitching wedge ==
A pitching wedge is the lowest-lofted of the named wedges, used to hit a variety of short-range shots. The modern pitching wedge has a loft of around 48° (exact lofts vary by clubmaker and player preference) and little or no "bounce" (angle of the sole to the ground).

The pitching wedge is descended from the "niblick", an obsolete blade-style club with a high loft. As the older naming system gave way to numbered sets in the mid- to late 1930s, the standardization of loft angles led to a split in the niblick's normal range of lofts, to create the 9-iron (with a loft at the time of about 48–50°) and a new club lofted around 52–54°. Some manufacturers such as MacGregor kept with the numbering system and labelled this club the "10-iron", while other makers, seeking to capitalize on the usefulness of this club in the "short game", named the club the "pitching wedge" to associate it with the relatively new sand wedge and its similar utility for close-in shots. The term "pitching wedge" is now used by virtually all manufacturers and players to describe this club; Karsten Manufacturing (maker of the PING brand) simply labels their pitching wedges "W" for "wedge".

The modern pitching wedge is typically used from the fairway or rough for "approach" or "lay-up" shots requiring a distance of between 100 and 125 yards (exact distance will vary, as with any golf club's distance, on a number of variables such as exact club design, player skill and swing speed, and course conditions). It can also be used to play a ball from a bunker when the ball has not buried itself into the sand and the player needs more distance on the shot than their sand wedge can provide. With an abbreviated "chip shot" swing, a pitching wedge can produce high-accuracy shots in the 30–70-yard range, and with a putting motion, the club can be used for "bump and run" shots from the rough or fringe onto the green.

== Gap wedge ==
A gap wedge is the next higher-lofted wedge after the pitching wedge, and is usually used in a similar manner. It is a newer wedge and so is one of the least standardized as to its purpose and thus its design, but lofts for gap wedges are centered on 52° and have a moderate amount of bounce.

The concept of the gap wedge originated when the loft angles of irons were reduced as a result of the higher launch angles of modern "cavity-back" irons for a given loft, and also from amateur players' desire for greater range. The pitching wedge was de-lofted along with the numbered irons from about 50–52° to about 45–48°; however, sand wedges remained the same, because their 54–58° loft is part of their design which makes them effective at cutting through sand. This results in a "gap" of about 8–10° between the pitching wedge and sand wedge, which can result in a difference in carry distance of up to 40 yards between these two clubs. To fill this "gap" in loft and distance, some golfers began carrying an additional wedge in the 50–54° range. This club was often the pitching wedge or 9-iron from the player's older "muscle-back" set, but as the practice became more common, manufacturers began designing wedges specifically for this role. While clubmakers invented different names for this club, such as "approach wedge" (Callaway), "attack wedge" (TaylorMade), "dual wedge" (Cleveland) and "utility wedge" (Karsten Manufacturing - PING), the term "gap wedge" is typically used in conversation to describe a wedge in this general loft range, and is used by some manufacturers such as Adams Golf. Some are simply identified by their loft angle and bounce; a "52-8" wedge is a gap wedge with 52° of loft and 8° of bounce.

The specifics of the gap wedge's design differ more between various examples than other wedges because the club is newer and so has a less well-defined traditional purpose. With the nominal loft of 52°, a gap wedge can be used for almost any shot in which the player would normally use their pitching wedge, but needs lesser distance; a full swing with a gap wedge will carry about 90–110 yards depending on the many inherent variables. A key area of variation between different gap wedges is in the bounce angle; typically the more bounce the club has, the better its performance in soft lies and tall grass, but the worse it will perform on firm or tight lies, and vice versa. Many players use a bounce of between 5° and 8°, making this club a blend of the characteristics of the neighboring pitching and sand wedges, allowing it to be used for certain bunker shots while not sacrificing its utility on firmer ground. However, gap wedges are available from 48–56° loft and with 0° to 12° of bounce, allowing a player to select the club with the exact characteristics they feel they'll need.

== Sand wedge ==
A sand wedge is a type of golf club with a specialized design intended to help the player play the ball from soft lies such as sand bunkers. It has a loft of about 56°, and about 10° of "bounce".

Gene Sarazen won the 1932 British and US Open tournaments with a new club he had invented that was specialized for sand play. He is hailed as the inventor of the modern sand wedge, which he developed by taking a niblick (9-iron), soldering additional metal underneath the leading edge to create a wide, heavy sole on the club, and then experimenting with the angle that the sole made to level ground. The resulting club had a wedge-shaped profile, and offered better loft to escape from deep or sloped bunkers (unlike the older low-lofted "jigger" traditionally used for bunker shots), while not "digging in" to the soft sand like a lofted iron such as the niblick would normally do.

The modern sand wedge still uses the ideas of high mass, high loft, and bounce angle, but the modern sand wedge clubhead has much higher mass than earlier designs, up to 40oz (2.5 lb, 1.13 kg), to drive the clubhead through the firmer sand found in many courses. There can also be differences in shaft length; while some sand wedges follow the systematic progression of shorter shaft lengths for higher lofts, many sand wedges are longer than the adjacent lofted wedges. This encourages the player to hit sand wedge shots "fat" (the club hits the ground before the ball), which on a firm lie is generally bad, but in the case of a ball embedded or buried in soft bunker sand this will get the clubhead all the way under the ball to lift it out. The resulting plume of sand from such a shot was made famous by Sarazen as the "explosion shot" and is a common sight in televised golf events.

As its name suggests, a sand wedge is used most often to extract the ball from a bunker. However, the features which make it useful for this purpose are advantageous in other soft lies such as thick rough, soggy ground or mud. While the high angle of bounce can make it difficult to use on firm lies (the sole will raise the leading edge of the club which can result in the player hitting the ball edge-on; a "thin" or "skulled" shot), it can be used much as any other "short iron" would; with a "full swing", a skilled golfer can typically hit a sand wedge between 80 and 100 yards, and with a chip shot, a sand wedge can produce short "lobs" of between 20 and 60 yards.

== Lob wedge ==
The lob wedge is a club with a loft of around 60°, typically the highest in a player's bag. It is used for specialized shots requiring either extreme launch angle, short carry distance and/or no rolling distance after impact.

Dave Pelz, a former NASA physicist and golf short-game coach, envisioned the lob wedge in the 1980s as an answer to modern greens, which are designed to be more difficult to approach to add extra challenge to the game. These greens are typically elevated above the fairway, are less level and more undulating than traditional greens, and are surrounded on some or all sides by hazards. These greens require an approach shot that drops the ball very precisely onto the green near the pin, and then "sticks" with little or no roll to prevent the ball following an uneven grade or overshooting the pin into a hazard. He proposed a new club with low to mid bounce and a loft angle of 60° to accomplish such a shot. Pro player Tom Kite was among the first players to use such a club, encouraging other professionals and amateurs to follow his lead. In 1984, Karsten Manufacturing introduced the first mass-produced "L" wedge, as part of PING's widely successful Eye and Eye-2 iron sets, cementing the wedge's name as the "lob" wedge.

The lob wedge can be used for any shot requiring a short carry distance (typically 10–50 yards), and/or a very high launch angle, which also results in high backspin and thus little rolling distance after impact. Such shots include tight approaches to the green, shots from close to a tree or other tall obstruction, shots to gain a more favorable lie on the fairway, and certain bunker shots. The high launch angle and thus long carry time can be an impediment in high winds, but skilled golfers can use the long "hang time" of a lob wedge shot to take advantage of a favorable wind. The wedge typically has low to moderate bounce (0–4°) for fairway and other firm lies, but because of its high loft even 2–3° of bounce will counterbalance the downward force of the wedge's striking face, making a club with this configuration useful in sand as well. Players will often use a lob wedge to play from a sand trap adjacent to the green, instead of "opening" a sand wedge (a more difficult shot to make accurately). It can be used with a full swing from the fairway or rough to carry about 40–60 yards, but it's more commonly used with a chip shot from very close to the green, to carry 10–40 yards and "drop" the ball into an exact spot on the green.

=== Ultra lob wedge ===
An ultra lob wedge is a specialization of the lob wedge with an extremely high loft, as high as 70°. Synonyms are generally marketing terms and include the "flop wedge" and "final wedge". When included in a club set, it generally has the highest loft of the set. It is used for specialized, extremely high-angle shots such as from the "lip" of a bunker. This wedge is generally made by specialty companies, and some argue that their purpose is redundant, as a regular lob wedge can be "opened" for extra loft in situations calling for such a high launch angle. However, these shots are very tricky to make as they require substantial changes to a player's normal swing mechanics.

== Other types of wedge ==
A less common type is the water wedge or water iron for play out of shallow water lies.

== See also ==
- Golf glossary
