= Bounce (golf) =

Angle formed between golf club and ground

In golf, bounce or bounce angle is the angle inscribed by the leading edge of a golfing iron (particularly a wedge), the sole of the club, and the ground. In plainer terms, bounce angle is an indication of how much the sole, or bottom-most part, of the club head lifts the leading edge. A high bounce angle (angles of 12–15° are not uncommon) indicates a sole which lifts the leading edge significantly, whereas a club with little or no bounce allows the leading edge to contact the ground without interference.

The purpose of introducing bounce into club head design is to control how easily wedges, with their steep angles of attack, penetrate the ground under the ball. A low- or zero-bounce club has a streamlined profile, and the sharp leading edge of the club will tend to cut into the ground readily. When this is undesirable, the use of a club with more bounce will cause the sole of the club to impact first, keeping the wedge from digging into the surface by causing it to "bounce" across the surface instead.

In Harvey Penick's Little Red Book, the word "bounce" is used only once. Penick mentioned it in relationship to an important wedge shot for tight lies. In addition to putting more weight on the front foot and striking the ball and ground at the same time, Penick said the golfer would play the ball off the back foot and square the clubface to the target so that "the bounce of the blade does not touch the ground."

In practical terms, lower bounce wedges are advised for thin grass and tight lies, whereas those with more bounce are generally employed in deep rough or sand.
