= Golf bunkers and penalty areas =

Obstacle on a golf course

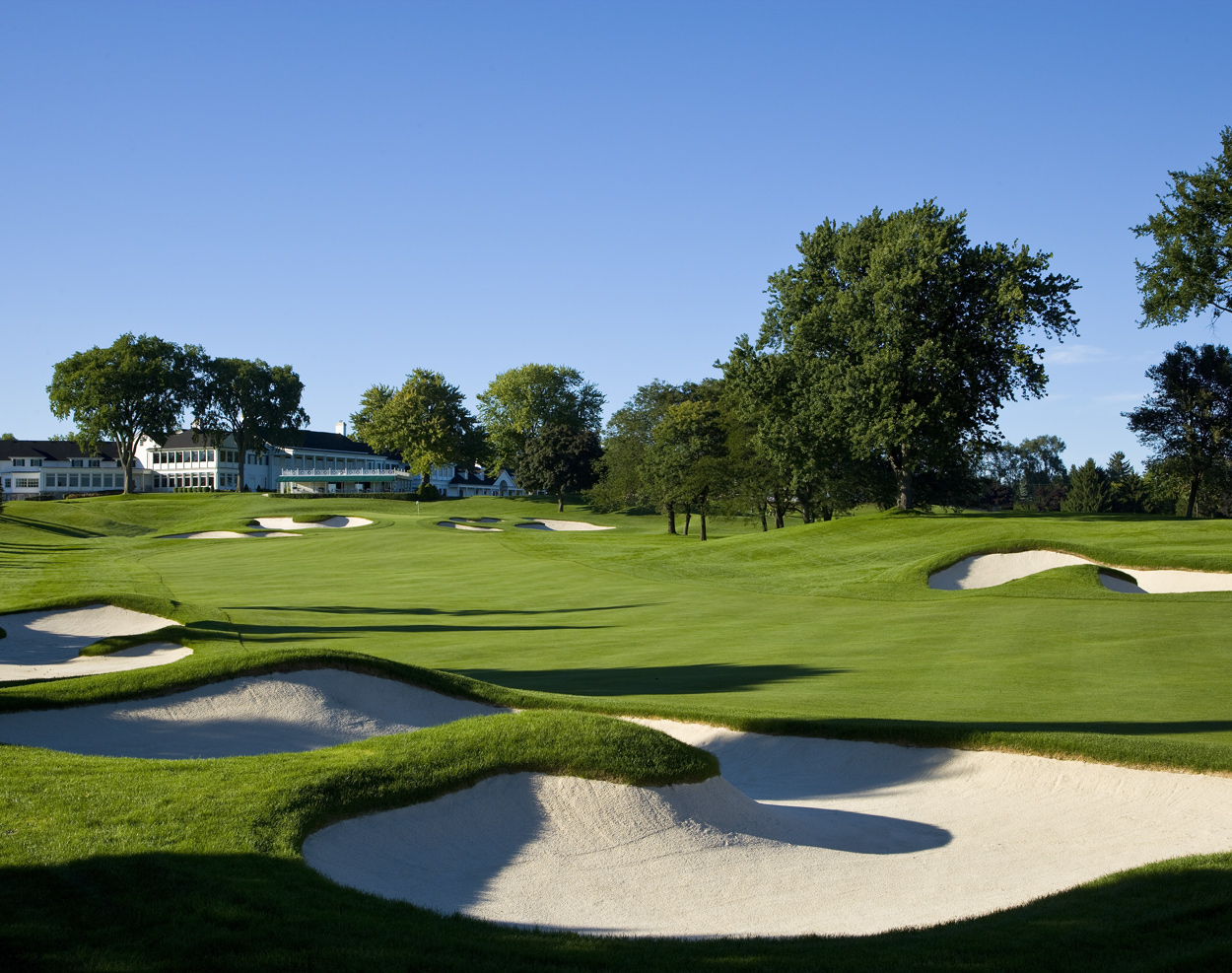
Fairway bunkers at the Oakland Hills Country Club, Bloomfield Township, Michigan

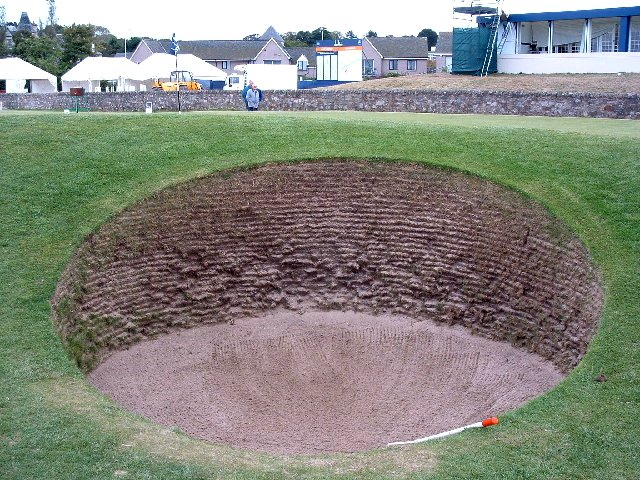
The road hole bunker at the Old Course at St Andrews

In the sport of golf, there are obstacles on a golf course traditionally known as hazards: bunkers, also known as sand traps, regions filled with sand; and penalty areas, also known as water hazards, which are usually rivers, streams, lakes, and ponds. Special rules apply when playing balls that fall in a hazard. For example, a player may not touch the ground with their club before playing a ball, not even for a practice swing. A ball in any hazard may be played as it lies without penalty. If it cannot be played from the hazard, the ball may be hit from another location, generally with a penalty of one stroke. The Rules of Golf govern exactly from where the ball may be played outside a hazard. Bunkers are shallow pits filled with sand and generally incorporating a raised lip or barrier, from which the ball is more difficult to play than from grass.

In 2019, the Rules of Golf that The R&A and the USGA maintain were updated to separate the rules for the two types of obstacle, and removed the umbrella term "hazard" or any rules that referred to hazards-in-general. It also clarified that penalty areas could include any marked regions on a course, rather than only applying to zones of permanent water.

== Bunker ==
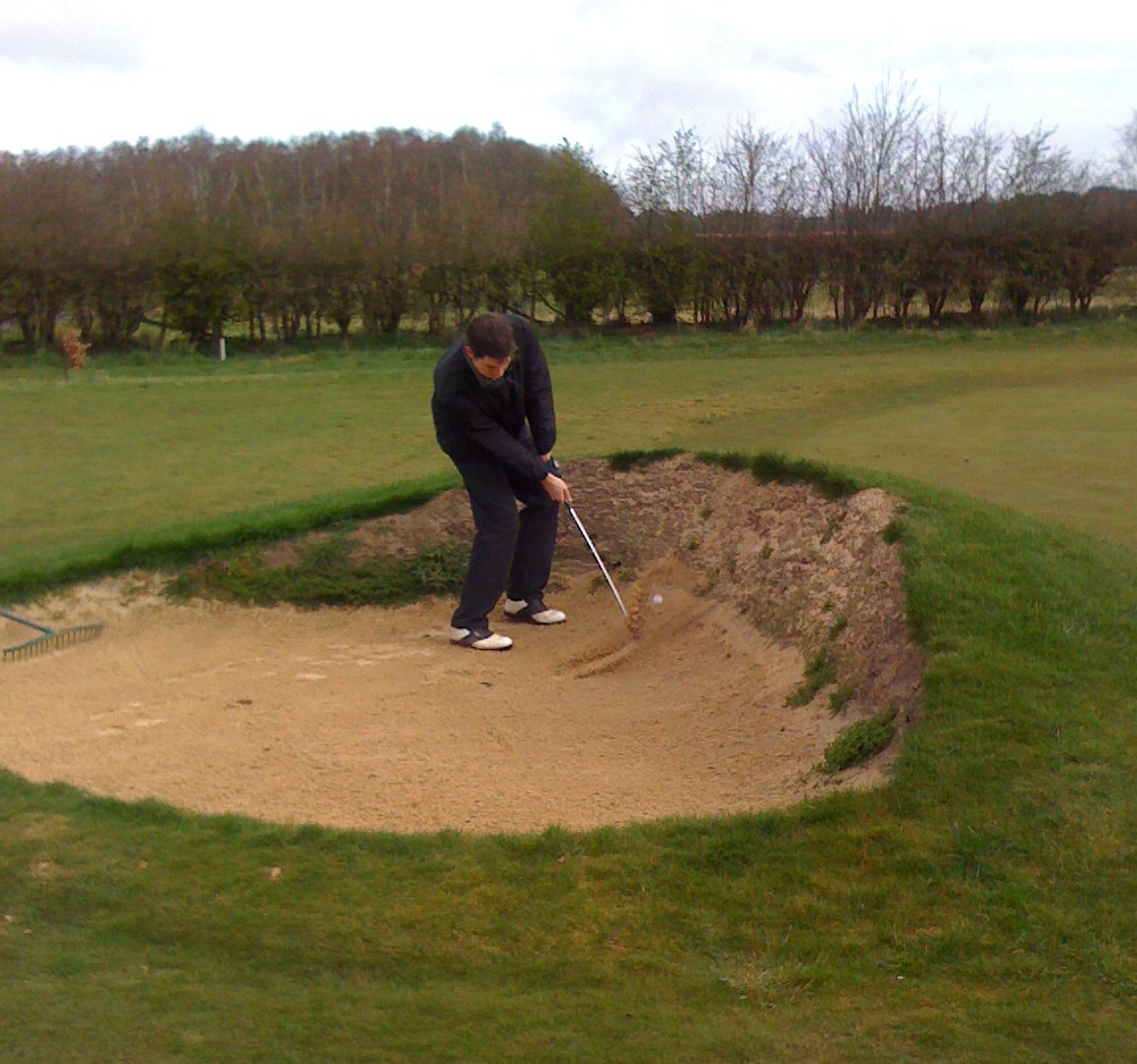
A golfer hitting from a greenside bunker

A bunker is a depression, commonly near the green or fairway, that is usually filled with sand. Playing the ball from a bunker is considered more difficult than from closely mown grass, and to do so proficiently requires a high degree of skill. A specialized club, a sand wedge, is designed for extracting the ball from a bunker. Specific rules of golf govern play from a bunker. For example, a player may not ground their club in a bunker; that is, the club cannot touch the ground before the swing.

According to the etiquette of the game, the player (or their caddie) is expected to smooth the area of the sand disturbed, normally using a rake, in order that conditions are similar for all subsequent players.

According to Gordon Moir, the links manager at St. Andrews, sand traps were originally formed out of natural depressions in the landscape because "the sheep would burrow down behind them (dunes) to take shelter from the wind. Over time, these areas hollowed out to form the bunkers, or as you Yanks say, sand traps."

Old Tom Morris is said to be responsible for maintaining sand traps and hazards to form playable conditions, using rakes to create surfaces that were more predictable than the natural hazards they once were. Additionally, he is said to have been a pioneer in the modern idea of placing hazards so that the golf ball could be routed around them, forming the beginning of strategic golf course design.

=== Types of bunkers ===
There are three types of bunkers used in golf course architecture and all are designed to be impediments to the golfer's progress toward the green. Fairway bunkers are designed primarily to gather up wayward tee shots on par 4 and par 5 holes; they are located to the sides of the fairway or even in the middle of the fairway. Greenside bunkers are designed to collect wayward approach shots on long holes and tee shots on par 3 holes; they are located near and around the green. Waste bunkers are natural sandy areas, usually very large and often found on links courses; they are not considered hazards according to the rules of golf, and so, unlike in fairway or greenside bunkers, golfers are permitted to ground a club lightly in, or remove loose impediments from, the area around the ball.

=== Notable incidents ===
Golf courses are generally expected to make clear which areas are bunkers and which are not. A famous case of this becoming a problem in high-level play involved Dustin Johnson at Whistling Straits in Kohler, Wisconsin during the 2010 PGA Championship. His effort on the 18th hole which seemingly qualified him for the final playoff, but was informed by officials that one of his strokes had been from an area that was not grass trampled by the crowd but was actually a bunker, and thus he had incurred a two-stroke penalty for the grounding of his club in preparation for the shot.

== Penalty areas ==
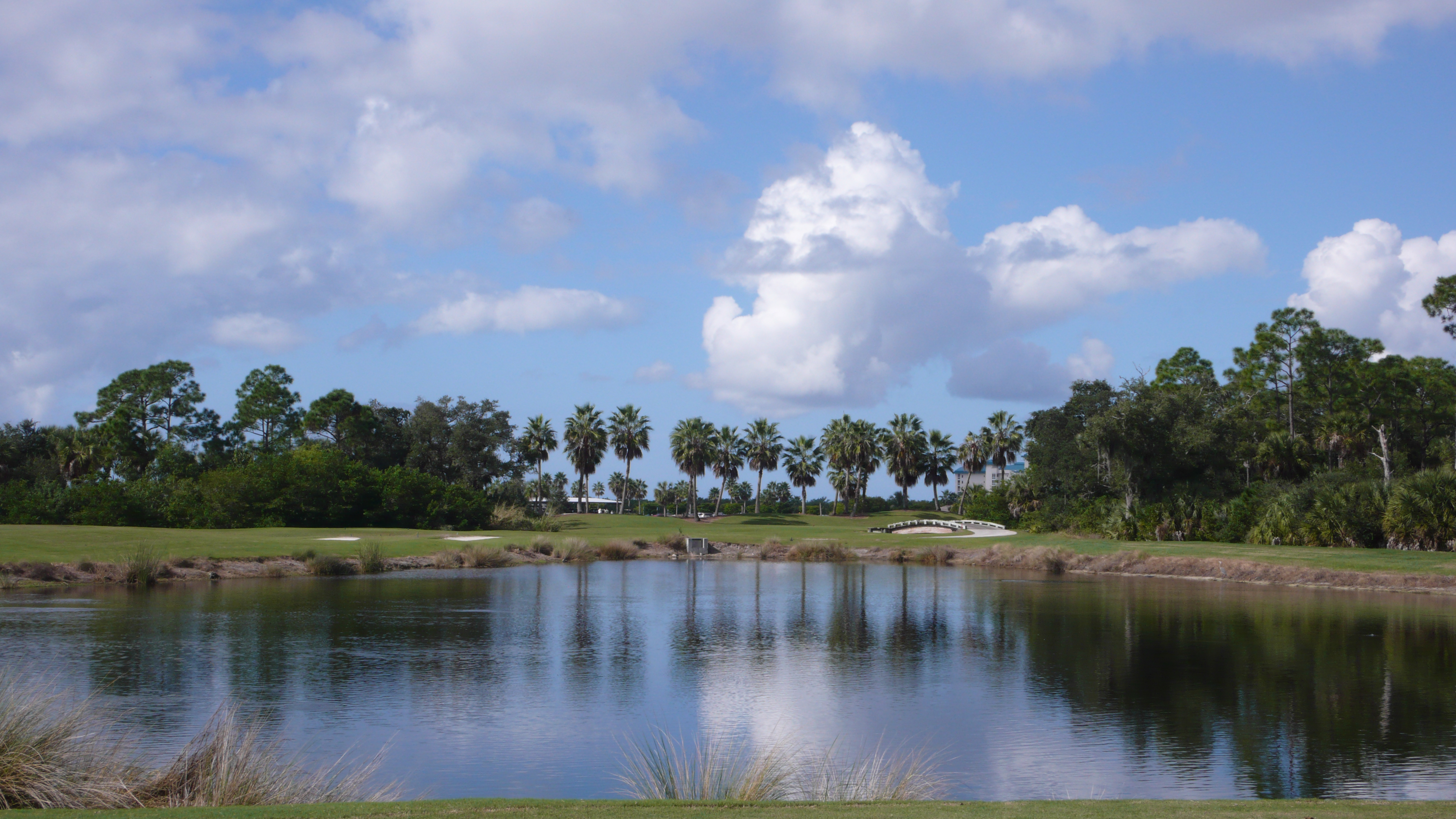
A water hazard on the Shell Point Golf Course in Iona, Florida

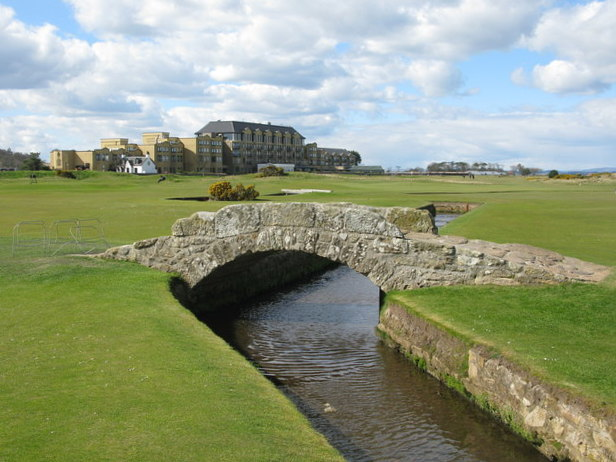
The Swilcan Burn on the Old Course at St Andrews

Penalty areas, like bunkers, are natural obstacles designed to add both beauty and difficulty to a golf course. They are typically bodies of water or other areas where balls are frequently lost or irrecoverable. Penalty areas were formerly referred to as water hazards. Penalty areas are typically either streams or ponds, situated between the teeing ground and the hole.

=== Types of penalty area ===
Two types of penalty area exist: "red" penalty areas formerly known as "lateral water hazards" (marked with red stakes around the perimeter of the hazard) and yellow penalty areas (marked with yellow stakes). Red penalty areas are usually adjacent to the fairway being played (along the side), while yellow penalty areas generally cross the fairway being played forcing the player to hit over the penalty area.

Penalty areas are distinct from "temporary water" or "casual water", which as the name suggests are puddles or runoff due to events such as recent rain or flooding. This is more of an issue on lower budget courses which can lack the resources to drain such water in a timely manner. The rules of golf permit players a free drop if their ball is unplayable due to temporary water.
