= Obsolete golf clubs =

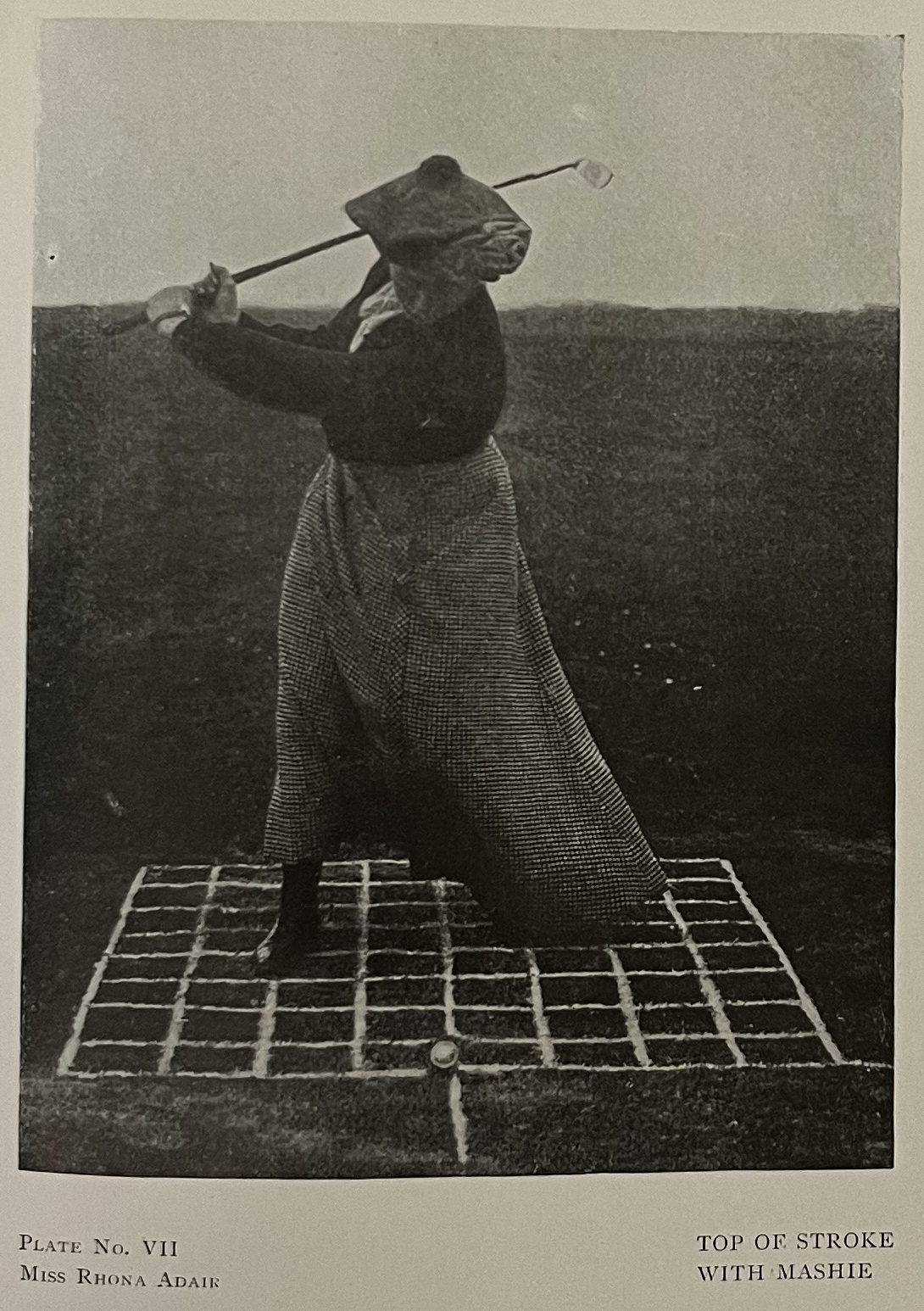
Rhona Adair, Irish female golfer, showing her top of stroke with mashie.

Modern golf club design has resulted in a standard prescribed set, rendering obsolete golf clubs those made under discontinued practices.

== Design history ==
Early clubs were all made of wood, and hand-crafted, often by the players themselves, with no standard shape or form. As the sport of golf developed, different clubs were fashioned to perform specific tasks and hit specific types of shots. Later, as the more malleable material of iron became widely used for shorter-range clubs, an even wider variety of clubs were developed.

Many of the clubs manufactured between 1901 and 1935 came from Scotland, but more and more started coming from larger US manufacturers. These early clubs had hickory shafts and wrapped leather grips. To secure the joins between the shaft and the head of the club, and between the grip and the shaft, whipping of black, waxed linen thread was used. Pre-1900 clubs (smooth-faced gutty era) used seven-ply thread. Clubs from the era 1900 to 1935 required four-ply thread.

From 1924 golf clubs started to be manufactured with shafts of steel, pyratone, aluminium, and fiberglass or resin; Many of them were given a wood-look coating.

== Woods ==
Wooden clubs generally had a metal base-plate and were made heavier with a lead insert into the back of the head; often the face of the club had an insert of bone or ivory to reduce the wear from impact on the wood.

They were:

- Play club: driver
- Brassie: so called because the base-plate was of brass; equivalent to a 3-wood (Note: In the UK in the 1960s, it was argued that the 2-wood was introduced for use with the larger "American" ball on the lusher American fairways.)
- Spoon: Higher-lofted wood; equivalent to a 5-wood
- Baffing spoon or a baffy: Approach wood; equivalent to a 7-wood

These were made of wood and were used until they were replaced by the numbered system used today.

== Irons ==
=== Nineteenth century irons ===
- Cleek – A metal-headed golf club having an elongated blade with little loft, equivalent to a one or two iron in a modern set of clubs.
- Lofter – A metal-headed golf club with a moderate loft ranging from a modern five iron to an eight iron.
- Niblick or Rut Niblick – a trouble club and pitching iron and generally the most lofted of the 19th century irons, with a very small rounded head and a loft equivalent to a modern nine iron or wedge.

The traditional set of irons was invented by Archibald Barrie, and was used from 1903 until about the 1940s. The introduction of the standardized numbered iron set produced by the Spalding Sporting Goods Company in the early 1930s caused the traditional set of irons to give way gradually to the numbered set.

The traditional irons varied greatly in loft (± 5°). The shape of the head determined some of the playing characteristics of the club; most traditional heads were roughly egg-shaped.

=== Twentieth century wood-shafted irons ===
They were:

- Driving iron: 1 Iron (comparable to a modern 4 iron)
- Mid-iron: 2 Iron (comparable to a modern 5 iron)
- Mid-mashie: 3 Iron (comparable to a modern 6 iron)
- Mashie iron: 4 Iron (comparable to a modern 7 iron)
- Mashie: 5 Iron (comparable to a modern 8 iron)
- Spade mashie: 6 Iron (comparable to a modern 9 iron)
- Mashie-niblick: 7 Iron (comparable to a modern pitching wedge)
- Pitching niblick: 8 Iron (comparable to a modern gap wedge)
- Niblick: 9 Iron (comparable to a modern sand wedge)
- Jigger: Very low lofted iron, shortened shaft, similar to a modern chipper
- Blaster: high lofted iron, equivalent to a modern sand iron

"Mashie" is derived from French massue, "club", while "niblick" is diminutive of neb/nib, "little nose." Although the niblick is usually linked with the modern-day 9 iron, due to the tendency of golf club manufacturers to lower the loft of their irons, the niblick’s loft was actually similar to that of a modern-day pitching wedge.

== Sabbath sticks ==
Sunday sticks or sabbath sticks were the golf enthusiast's answer to the Church of Scotland's discouragement of golfing on Sundays. Clubs were disguised as walking sticks, the club head comfortably fitting into the palm of the golfer's hand, until when the golfer was unobserved, the stick was reversed and a few strokes were played.

== See also ==
- Hickory golf
