= Golf license =

Skill certification for European golfers

The GVB (Golfvaardigheidsbewijs in Dutch, Brevet d´aptitude in French) or golf ability license is a standardised test and licensing process which players of the game of golf must go through in order to be allowed to play on many golf courses in Belgium, Germany or the Netherlands.

The NGF (Dutch Golf Federation) changed the name to “handicap 54.”

== History ==
The GVB was introduced because there are few golf courses in relation to the number of golfers. Because there was no requirement previous to the GVB, anyone could play on a public course. This led to situations which were hazardous or undesirable to other players. In the 1980s the GVB was introduced (in Belgium in 1988) to remedy this problem. The GVB is basically a pre-handicap. It guarantees a certain level of ability and knowledge of the rules and etiquette. The GVB is required for entrance into a golfing association or to play on an official golfing association course although most clubs have their own admittance policy.

Some clubs and courses (like in a lot of other countries) demand a handicap certificate or certifiable level of play (i.e. handicap 24) for guests.

== Level of play ==
In the Netherlands there are three types of level of play:

- Baanpermissie (course permission): the local pro has determined that the player is good enough to go out on the local course (but only the local course).
- Golfvaardigheidsbewijs (GVB): the player has taken a test and is deemed good enough to obtain the GVB. The player can play on any course where GVB is the minimal requirement.
- Handicap: the player has taken the handicap exam and has played the required number of holes with a score deemed eligible for a handicap. The player can now play any course for which the handicap is the minimum requirement.

Many club players skip the GVB part and go straight to the handicap exam.

== The GVB test ==
The test comprises a written portion and a practical portion. The written portion is twenty questions; five about golf etiquette, the other fifteen about the rules. The practical portion consists of playing four holes. The player's best three holes are counted; the player must score below 21 to pass the test.

Players are free to choose a course to take their test. Some clubs or courses offer a package deal where one attains a GVB after a weekend of workshops, learning and training.

It is not necessary for a player to be a member of a club or course in the Netherlands to have a GVB or a handicap. The player can register with the Stichting Golfsport for a fee and the GVB or handicap will be maintained (even if it is not a Dutch GVB or handicap).
