= Francis Scheid =

American mathematician

Francis Scheid (September 24, 1920 – February 24, 2011) was an American mathematician and influential researcher in golf handicapping.

== Golf handicapping ==
Scheid wrote several pioneering articles on golf handicapping. He challenged the United States Golf Association handicapping system in a 1971 article "You’re Not Getting Enough Strokes!" in Golf Digest magazine, arguing that the system unfairly favored stronger golfers over weaker golfers. In 1973, he wrote an article "Does Your Handicap Hold Up on Tougher Courses?" In 1978, he wrote "The Search for the Perfect Handicap," in which he observed that large tournaments and head-to-head matches require different handicapping systems to achieve fair play (an equal chance of winning for any player).

He was a charter member of the USGA Handicap Research Team, which developed the Slope course rating system. He helped lead a USGA study of handicapping multi-ball team events, and introduced the Scheid System for estimating a handicap based on only one round of play, which is useful in events where most players do not have handicaps. In 2005, Golf Digest consulted him on the odds of making a hole-in-one, which he estimated to be 12,000 to 1 for an average player.

He wrote four popular books on the mathematics of golf, including "Golfers Come in Many Shapes and Sizes," an account of the theory and history of golf handicapping, and also "You Can't Get Lost on a Golf Course," "Student of the Game," and "Tiger-Numbers and Annika-Numbers."

"Dr. Scheid was [...] a golf innovator and likely one you’ve never heard of. But if you’re a high-handicapper, you owe him a debt of gratitude, because his research helped boost your handicap strokes to the level that gives you a fighting chance against the big boys," wrote Cliff Schrock of Golf Digest’s Resource Center.

== Academic career ==
Scheid was a professor of mathematics at Boston University from 1951 to 1985, including 12 years as department chairman. He received his B.A. from Boston University in 1942, and his doctorate in mathematics from MIT in 1948. In the 1960s and 70s, he created more than one-hundred televised mathematics lectures for the Harvard Commission on Extension Courses, which were used by the U.S. Navy and shown on WGBH-TV. He traveled widely teaching mathematics for the Navy, including two trips to McMurdo Station in Antarctica. He served as a Fulbright professor for a year in Rangoon, Burma, and a year in Lausanne, Switzerland.

== Personal life ==
Scheid married Barbara Paty in 1944 and had three daughters and five grandchildren. He was an avid sailor and spent many summers with his family and friends on the coast of Maine in his wooden schooner, Great Circle. His own golf handicap was 6.
