= License =

Legal concept

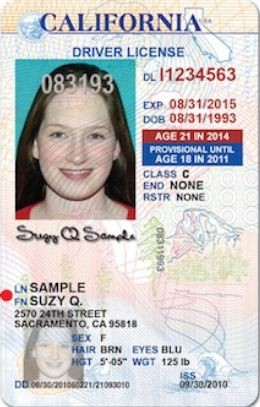
Governments issue driver's licenses to people who are allowed to drive motor vehicles on public roads.

A license (American English) or licence (Commonwealth English) is an official permission or permit to do, use, or own something (as well as the document of that permission or permit).

A license is granted by a party (licensor) to another party (licensee) as an element of an agreement between those parties. In the case of a license issued by a government, the license is obtained by applying for it. In the case of a private party, it is by a specific agreement, usually in writing (such as a lease or other contract). The simplest definition is "A license is a promise not to sue", because a license usually either permits the licensed party to engage in an illegal activity, and subject to prosecution, without the license (e.g. fishing, driving an automobile, or operating a broadcast radio or television station), or it permits the licensed party to do something that would violate the rights of the licensing party (e.g. make copies of a copyrighted work), which, without the license, the licensed party could be sued, civilly, criminally, or both.

In particular, a license may be issued by authorities, to allow an activity that would otherwise be forbidden. It may require paying a fee or proving a capability (or both). The requirement may also serve to keep the authorities informed on a type of activity, and to allow them to set conditions and limitations.

A licensor may grant a license under intellectual property laws to authorize a use (such as copying software or using a patented invention) to a licensee, sparing the licensee from a claim of infringement brought by the licensor. A license under intellectual property commonly has several components beyond the grant itself, including a term, territory, renewal provisions, and other limitations deemed vital to the licensor.

Term: many licenses are valid for a particular length of time. This protects the licensor should the value of the license increase, or market conditions change. It also preserves enforceability by ensuring that no license extends beyond the term of the agreement.

Territory: a license may stipulate what territory the rights pertain to. For example, a license with a territory limited to "North America" (Mexico/United States/Canada) would not permit a licensee any protection from actions for use in Kyrgyzstan.

Again, a shorthand definition of a license is "a promise by the licensor not to sue the licensee". That means without a license any use or exploitation of intellectual property by a third party would amount to copying or infringement. Such copying would be improper and could, by using the legal system, be stopped if the intellectual property owner wanted to do so.

Intellectual property licensing plays a major role in business, academia and broadcasting. Business practices such as franchising, technology transfer, publication and character merchandising entirely depend on the licensing of intellectual property. Land licensing (proprietary licensing) and IP licensing.

== Real property licenses ==
A license provides one party with the authority to act on another's land, when such action would typically amount to trespass absent that license. A key distinction between licenses and leases is that a license grants the licensee a revocable non-assignable privilege to act upon the land of the licensor, without granting any possessory interest in the land. Once a license is agreed upon, the licensee may occupy the land only so far as is necessary to complete the act. Another key distinction between a license and a lease is that leases are generally required to be in writing, where the statute of frauds requires it, while licenses can be made orally.

=== Creation ===
A license is generally created by an express or implied agreement. The licensor must agree to the license which can be shown in writing or the licensors acquiescence in its exercise. Furthermore, unlike many other contractual agreements, a license does not require consideration, a license can be created with or without it. Moreover, whether an agreement is held to be a "license" and not a lease will depend on three essential characteristics of a license: (1) a clause allowing the licensor to revoke "at will"; (2) the retention by the licensor of absolute control over the premises; and (3) the licensor's supplying to the licensee all of the essential services required for the licensee's permitted use of the premises.

=== Termination ===
Under a pure licensing agreement, the licensor, under its terms and by common-law, can cancel the agreement at will and without cause, unless it is coupled with an interest or made irrevocable by contract. A license that has been coupled with an interest is not revocable by the licensor without exposure to liability and potential damages. In the event a license is coupled with an interest, the licensor must provide reasonable time for the licensee to remove that interest from the property before termination. Additionally, because a license does not confer any possessory interest in the licensee, in the event of a sale of the property, the license is terminated and cannot be enforced against the new owners of that property. Moreover, the death of either the licensee or licensor will terminate the agreement.

=== Remedies ===
If a license is revocable at will by the licensor, courts will be unable to grant specific performance in favor of the licensee. A licensee would be unsuccessful in bringing forcible entry claims or a detainer proceeding because the licensee was never granted any possessory interest. The Licensee would also not be able to recover damages for money spent unless they are able to show detrimental reliance on the license. In certain cases, however, licenses can be made irrevocable, and specific performance may be granted. Where a license is made with a set term period and valid consideration is transferred, revocation of the license before the terms expiration may raise breach of contract claims that could provide damages against the licensor. Furthermore, once the licensor terminates or revokes the license, notice is statutorily required before the commencement of any special proceeding to recover possession of the property (e.g., in NY that requirement is 10 days).

== Mass licensing of software ==
Mass distributed software is used by individuals on personal computers under license from the developer of that software. Such license is typically included in a more extensive end-user license agreement (EULA) entered into upon the installation of that software on a computer. Typically, a license is associated with a unique code, that when approved grants the end user access to the software in question.

Under a typical end-user license agreement, the user may install the software on a limited number of computers.

The enforceability of end-user license agreements is sometimes questioned.

As of 2020, there are various ways to license software with different kinds of licensing models, which allow software vendors to profit from their product offerings in flexible ways.

== Patent licensing ==
Like other intellectual property, patent owners may grant permission to others to engage in conduct that would otherwise be within the scope of a patent. For example, a patent owner may authorize a licensee to make, use, sell, offer for sale, or import a patented product. Such agreements are typically referred to as a patent license agreement or a covenant not to sue. These agreements can last for a specific period of time (such as five years) or for the entire life of the patent (i.e., until the patent expires). Patent license agreements may also be exclusive (i.e., the licensee is the only person or entity that is allowed to sell, make, use, offer to sell, or import the patented invention) or non-exclusive (i.e., the licensee is simply one of several entities who has rights under the patent). Finally, any rights given under the agreement may be limited to a particular "field of use" (e.g., a licensee may be able to practice an invention in the field of consumer electronics, but not in the field of industrial electronics).

Often, patent owners will require a licensee to pay money in exchange for granting a patent license. Such payments are referred to as royalty payments and come primarily in two forms: lump sum or running royalty. A lump sum royalty involves an upfront, one-time payment, while a running royalty typically involves periodic payments (e.g., quarterly or annual) based on the number of patented products sold or imported.

Examples of patent fees include:

- Mobile phone OEMs (including Samsung) should pay FAT32, VFAT and other patent fees to Microsoft (usually with cross licensing).
- Desktop and mobile OEMs should pay H.264 and HEVC patent fees to MPEG-LA.

== Trademark and brand licensing ==
A licensor may grant permission to a licensee to distribute products under a trademark. With such a license, the licensee may use the trademark without fear of a claim of trademark infringement by the licensor. The assignment of a license often depends on specific contractual terms. The most common terms are, that a license is only applicable for a particular geographic region, just for a certain period of time or merely for a stage in the value chain. Moreover, there are different types of fees within the trademark and brand licensing. The first form demands a fee independent of sales and profits, the second type of license fee is dependent on the productivity of the licensee.

For example, McDonald's licenses their trademark such as the "Golden Arches" or the "Big Mac", but the licenses gives McDonald's a right to impose strict quality standards to their franchisees as they can take back the right to the trademark if they do not meet McDonald's standards.

When a licensor grants permission to a licensee to not only distribute, but manufacture a patented product, it is known as licensed production.

== Artwork and character licensing ==
A licensor may grant a permission to a licensee to copy and distribute copyrighted works such as "art" (e.g., Thomas Kinkade's painting Dawn in Los Gato) and characters (e.g., Mickey Mouse). With such license, a licensee need not fear a claim of copyright infringement brought by the copyright owner.

Artistic license is, however, not related to the aforementioned license. It is a euphemism that denotes freedom of expression, the ability to make the subject appear more engaging or attractive, by fictionalizing part of the subject.

== Academia ==
National examples of the licentiate are listed at licentiate (degree)

A licentiate is an academic degree that traditionally conferred the license to teach at a university or to practice a particular profession. The term survived despite the fact that nowadays a doctorate is typically needed in order to teach at a university. The term is also used for a person who holds a licentiate. In English, the degree has never been called a license. In France, the licence is the first degree awarded in Universities.

In Sweden, Finland, and in some other European university systems, a 'licentiate' is a postgraduate degree between the master's degree and the doctorate. The licentiate is a popular choice in those countries where a full doctoral degree would take five or more years to achieve.

== Vehicle licensing ==
A vehicle license is required in most countries to legally drive a vehicle on public roads. This typically involves obtaining a driver's license, which is granted based on an individual's ability to operate specific types of vehicles. The requirements and processes for obtaining a driver's license vary from country to country and may depend on the type of vehicle one intends to drive.

=== How it works in various countries ===
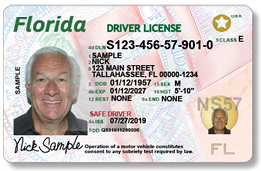
Driver's License in Florida, United States

- In the United States, each state has its own system for issuing driver's licenses, which usually involves passing both a written test and a road test. The classes of licenses differ by the type of vehicle, such as standard passenger vehicles, motorcycles, commercial trucks, and buses. A commercial driver's license (CDL) is required for large vehicles like trucks and buses, while a motorcycle endorsement is required to ride a motorcycle.
- In the United Kingdom, the system is centralized and managed by the Driver and Vehicle Licensing Agency (DVLA). A person must first obtain a provisional license and then take a driving theory test followed by a practical driving test. There are different categories of licenses depending on the type of vehicle, including a Category B for cars, Category A for motorcycles, and Category C for larger vehicles such as trucks.
- In Germany, the process for obtaining a driver's license is handled through a series of steps that include enrolling in driving school, passing both a theoretical test and a practical driving test, and meeting a minimum age requirement. Germany has a highly structured system for vehicle licenses, with licenses divided into categories such as Class B for cars, Class A for motorcycles, and Class C for trucks. The process is often more stringent, requiring thorough training and examinations.
- In India, the licensing system is governed by the Ministry of Road Transport and Highways (MoRTH). An individual must first obtain a learner's license before taking the driving test for a permanent driver's license. There are separate licenses for motorcycles, cars, and heavy vehicles. Road safety and traffic regulations are major components of the testing process.

=== License classes ===
Licensing classifications differ by country but typically include categories for:

- Private vehicles – Standard cars and motorcycles.
- Commercial vehicles – Buses, trucks, and vehicles used for freight transport.
- Specialized vehicles – Taxis, ambulances, and other vehicles requiring additional qualifications.
- Endorsements – In many countries, additional endorsements are needed to operate specialized vehicles, such as vehicles with trailers or public transportation vehicles.

=== International driving permits ===
For individuals traveling abroad, an International Driving Permit (IDP) can be obtained. This is a translation of the individual's domestic driver's license and is required by some countries for foreigners to drive within their borders.

== Criminal law ==
In the United Kingdom prisoners serving a determinate sentence (a fixed time in prison) will be released prior to the completion of their full sentence "on licence". The licence is the prisoner's agreement to maintain certain conditions, such as periodic reporting in to a probation officer and only living at an approved address, in exchange for their early release. If they break the conditions of the licence, they can be "recalled" (returned to prison).

Offenders serving determinate sentences are released automatically at a set point in their sentence, whereas prisoners serving indeterminate sentences (e.g. life imprisonment) can only be released by the parole board.

== Economic theory ==
Patent licensing has been studied in formal economic models in the field of industrial organization. In particular, Katz and Shapiro (1986) have explored the optimal licensing strategy of a research lab selling to firms who are competitors on the product market. It turns out that (compared to the welfare-maximizing solution) the licensor's incentives to develop innovations may be excessive, while the licensor's incentives to disseminate the innovation are typically too low. Subsequently, the seminal work of Katz and Shapiro (1986) has been extended in several directions. For example, Bhattacharya, Glazer, and Sappington (1992) have taken into account that the firms acquiring licenses must make further investments in order to develop marketable products. Schmitz (2002, 2007) has shown that asymmetric information due to adverse selection or moral hazard may lead the research lab to sell more licenses than it would do under complete information. Antelo and Sampayo (2017) have studied the optimal number of licenses in a signalling model.

== Criticism ==
The provision of licenses and the agencies that mandate them are often criticised by American libertarians like Milton Friedman for creating an anticompetitive environment for occupations, which creates a barrier to entry for more qualified and skilled individuals who may not have the resources to obtain the necessary licences. According to Friedman, licenses and permits have become so burdensome due to legislation that favors the current establishment of wealthy occupants that they decrease the supply of such occupations, which raises prices for the average consumer. Libertarians and the anti-authoritarian left (anarcho-communists) view competing guilds and other voluntary communes as being more beneficial for disseminating the skills and education required to perform a specified career.

== See also ==
Intellectual property-related:
- Brand licensing
- Compulsory license
- Cross-licensing
- Free license
- Licensed production
- Music licensing
- Non-assertion covenant
- Smartphone patent wars
- Software license
- Statutory license
Other:
- Amateur radio license
- Banking license
- Broadcast license
- Dog licence
- Driver's license
- Firearms license
- Golf license
- Hunting license
- Law license
- License to kill
- Licensee
- Licensing context (linguistics)
- Liquor license
- Marriage license
- Medical license
- Occupational licensing
- Pilot license
- Television licence
- Vehicle license
- Driver's license
- International Driving Permit
- Vehicle registration
