= GVB =

GVB may refer to:

== Companies and organizations ==
- Gaither Vocal Band, an American gospel group
- GVB (Amsterdam), a municipal transport company in Amsterdam, the Netherlands

== Places ==
- Garibaldi Volcanic Belt, in British Columbia, Canada
- Grover Beach (Amtrak station), in Grover Beach, California, United States

== Science ==
- Generalized valence bond, in chemistry
- Grapevine virus B, a plant virus

== Other uses ==
- Giovanni van Bronckhorst, a Dutch football player
- Girls v. Boys, an American reality television series
- Godzilla vs. Biollante, a 1989 film
- Golf license (Dutch: Golfvaardigheidsbewijs), a certification for European golfers
