= Hole in one =

In golf, the occasion when a ball hit from a tee finishes in the cup

In golf, a hole in one or hole-in-one (pl.: holes-in-one/holes in one) (also known as an ace, mostly in American English) occurs when a ball hit from the tee on the first stroke of a hole finishes in the cup. Holes-in-one most commonly occur on par 3 holes, the shortest holes on a standard size golf course. Longer hitters have also recorded holes-in-one on longer holes, though nearly all par-4 and par-5 holes are too long for golfers to reach in a single shot. Although holes-in one generally require an accurate, well-hit shot, they also involve a significant amount of luck. As of January 2021, a condor (four under par) hole-in-one on a par-5 hole had been recorded on five occasions.

== Description ==
In golf, a hole in one or hole-in-one occurs when a ball hit from a tee to start a hole finishes in the cup. The feat is also known as an ace, mostly in American English. As the feat needs to occur on the stroke that starts a hole, a ball hit from a tee following a lost ball, out-of-bounds, or water hazard is not a hole-in-one, due to the application of a stroke penalty.

== Rarity ==
While well known outside golf and often requiring a well hit shot and significant power, holes-in-one need also a significant element of luck. Time magazine reported 1,200 holes in one were made by American golfers in 1922.

Holes-in-one most commonly occur on par 3 holes, the shortest distance holes on a standard size golf course. Longer hitters have also accomplished this feat on longer holes, though nearly all par 4 and par 5 holes are too long for golfers to reach in a single shot. As such, they are more common and considered less impressive than other hole accomplishments such as completing a par 5 in two shots (an albatross).

=== Miniature golf ===
The world record on one round of minigolf is 18 strokes on 18 holes, a score relatively common for courses constructed of eternit. On other playing systems, a perfect round of 18 holes-in-one is extremely rare, although such rounds have been reported in Sweden on both felt and concrete courses.

== Holes-in-one on par 5 (or higher) holes ==
As of January 2021, a condor (four under par) hole-in-one on a par 5 hole had been recorded on five occasions, aided by thin air at high altitude, or by cutting the corner on a doglegged or horseshoe-shaped hole.

- A horseshoe-shaped par-5 hole once enabled a condor hole-in-one to be achieved with a 3-iron club.
- Another may have been achieved at the former Piedmont Crescent Golf Course in 1973 after bouncing multiple times on a very firm fairway due to unseasonably dry weather.
- The longest recorded straight drive hole-in-one is believed to be 517 yards or 473 metres, on the par-5 No. 9 hole at Green Valley Ranch Golf Club in Denver in 2002, aided by the thin air due to the high altitude.

None of the five par-5 holes-in-one were achieved during a professional tournament.

== Notable holes-in-one ==
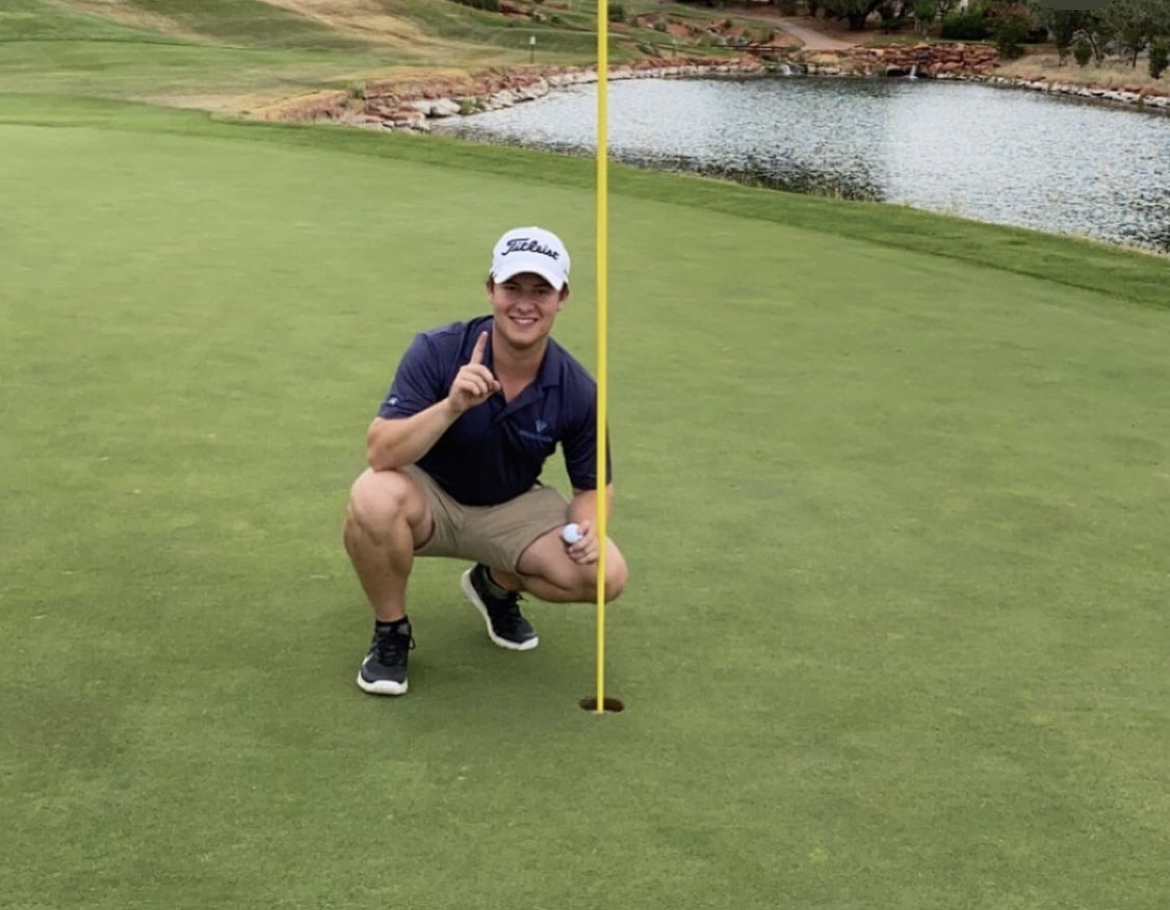
An amateur golfer celebrates a hole in one.

A memorable hole-in-one was made in the 1973 Open Championship by Gene Sarazen at age 71. Earl Dietering of Memphis, Tennessee, 78 years old at the time, is believed to hold the record for the oldest person to make a hole-in-one twice during one round.

During the second round of the 1971 Martini International tournament, held at the Royal Norwich Golf Club in England, John Hudson had two consecutive holes-in-one. Teeing off, using a 4-iron, at the par-three, 195-yard 11th hole, Hudson holed his tee shot for a hole-in-one. At the next hole, the downhill 311-yard, par-four 12th, and this time using a driver, he once again holed his tee shot, for another ace. This is believed to be the only time a player has scored holes-in-one at consecutive holes in a major professional tournament.

Despite the relative rarity of holes-in-one, there have been a total of six in Ryder Cup matches. Peter Butler scored the first in 1973 at Muirfield followed by a 20-year gap before Nick Faldo scored a hole-in-one in 1993. Two years later, Costantino Rocca and Howard Clark both scored holes-in-one before an 11-year gap to 2006 saw Paul Casey and Scott Verplank both hole out in one on the 14th hole.

On August 11, 2016, Justin Rose shot a hole-in-one during the first round of the golf tournament of the 2016 Summer Olympics in Rio de Janeiro, which is considered to be the first in Olympic history. For the 189 yards par-3 hole, he used a 7-iron.

== Traditions ==
It is traditional for a player who has scored a hole-in-one to buy a round of drinks for everyone at the clubhouse bar.

=== Competitions ===
Occasionally special events host a hole in one contest, where prizes as expensive as a new car, or cash awards sometimes reaching $4 million are offered if a contestant records a hole in one. Usually such expensive prizes are backed by an insurance company who offers prize indemnification services. Actuaries at such companies have calculated the chance of an average golfer making a hole in one at approximately 12,500 to 1, and the odds of a tour professional at 2,500 to 1.

== See also ==
- Golf glossary
- Miniature golf
- Hail Mary pass, similar feat in American football
- List of longest NBA field goals (all of which are buzzer beaters) for context on the similar feat in basketball
