= Non-assertion covenant =

A non-assertion covenant (nonassert for short) is an agreement by a party not to seek to enforce patent or other intellectual property rights it may have against another party or parties. Nonasserts are often used as patent-infringement settlement agreements that are designed and drafted with the purpose of preemptively resolving future infringement disputes.

Nonasserts can take three forms:

1. an agreement between two parties
2. an agreement among several parties
3. a public statement

A non-assert can specify the release of only certain patent rights or fields of use, or it can be broad and specify release for entire patent families, including future inventions in a certain area. Public statements effectively place rights to patents, or elements thereof, into the public domain.

Nonasserts can have wide-ranging implications in terms of enhancing public sector R&D. One application could be with patent rights covering research tools that are critical for accelerating the development of essential biotechnological applications. Specifically targeted non-asserts can also be effective instruments for industry to permit the use of patented inventions anywhere in the world, provided such use is for the express purposes of addressing specific humanitarian needs in developing countries. This could have broad-ranging and significant positive impact, as this approach reduces transaction costs, encourages innovation to help the poor, and accomplishes this without any loss of commercial opportunities."

== See also ==
- License § Patent licensing
