= Rules of golf =

The rules of golf consist of a standard set of regulations and procedures by which the sport of golf should be played. They are jointly written and administered by The R&A (spun off from The Royal and Ancient Golf Club of St Andrews in 2004) and the United States Golf Association (USGA). The R&A is the governing body of golf worldwide except in the United States and Mexico, which are the responsibility of the USGA. The rule book, entitled Rules of Golf, is updated and published on a regular basis and also includes rules governing amateur status.

The rules of golf cover all aspects of play, including definitions of terminology, procedures and equipment parameters. It also prescribes specific penalties that may be enacted in certain situations and for rule infractions. A central principle, although not one of the numbered rules, is found in the R&A rule book's inside front cover: "Play the ball as it lies, play the course as you find it, and if you cannot do either, do what is fair. But to do what is fair, you need to know the Rules of Golf."

In addition to the rules, golf adheres to a code of conduct known as etiquette, which generally means playing the game with due respect for the golf course and other players. Etiquette is often seen as being as important to the sport as the rules themselves.

== History ==
Before the rules of golf were standardised golf clubs commonly had their own set of rules, which while broadly the same had subtle differences, such as allowing for the removal of loose impediments, e.g. leaves and small stones. In the late 19th century, most clubs began to align themselves with either the Society of St. Andrews Golfers, later the R&A, or the Gentlemen Golfers of Leith, later the Honourable Company of Edinburgh Golfers.

The earliest surviving written rules of golf were produced by the Gentlemen Golfers of Leith on March 7, 1744, for a tournament played on April 2. They were entitled "Articles and Laws in Playing at Golf" and consisted of 13 rules. The original manuscript of the rules is in the collection of the National Library of Scotland:

1. You must Tee your Ball, within a Club's length of the Hole.
2. Your Tee must be upon the Ground.
3. You are not to change the Ball which you Strike off the Tee.
4. You are not to remove Stones, Bones or any Break Club, for the sake of playing your Ball, Except upon the fair Green, & that only within a Club's length of your Ball.
5. If your Ball come among Water, or any wattery filth, you are at liberty to take out your Ball & bringing it behind the hazard and Teeing it, you may play it with any Club and allow your Adversary a Stroke for so getting out your Ball.
6. If your Balls be found anywhere touching one another, You are to lift the first Ball, till you play the last.
7. At Holling, you are to play your Ball honestly for the Hole, and, not to play upon your Adversary's Ball, not lying in your way to the Hole.
8. If you should lose your Ball, by its being taken up, or any other way, you are to go back to the Spot, where you struck last, & drop another Ball, And allow your adversary a Stroke for the misfortune.
9. No man at Holling his Ball, is to be allowed, to mark his way to the Hole with his Club or any thing else.
10. If a Ball be stopp'd by any person, Horse, Dog, or any thing else, The Ball so stop'd must be play'd where it lyes.
11. If you draw your Club in order to Strike & proceed so far in the Stroke, as to be bringing down your Club; If then, your Club shall break, in any way, it is to be Accounted a Stroke.
12. He whose Ball lyes farthest from the Hole is obliged to play first.
13. Neither Trench, Ditch or Dyke, made for the preservation of the Links, nor the Scholar's Holes or the Soldier's Lines, shall be accounted a Hazard; But the Ball is to be taken out Teed and playd with any Iron Club.

Debate surrounds the authorship of these regulations, which were signed by John Rattray and which—on matters of order of play, outside interference, water hazards, holing out, making a stroke, and the stroke and distance penalty for the loss of a ball—remain an integral part of the modern game. Rattray's sole signature does not guarantee that he was wholly responsible for them, though his prominence within the company and Edinburgh society at large makes him the most likely candidate. Under these rules he went on to win the silver club for a second time in April 1745.

== Rules of Golf (book) ==
The Rules of Golf and the Rules of Amateur Status are published every four years by the governing bodies of golf (R&A/USGA) to define how the game is to be played. The Rules have been published jointly in this manner since 1952, although the code was not completely uniform until 2000 (with mostly minor revisions to Appendix I). Before 2012 the USGA and R&A presented the same content differently in separate editions. The same content is now published in a uniform fashion with similar formatting and covers — the only differences are now some spelling and their logos. The Rules Committee of The R&A, which was spun off from The Royal and Ancient Golf Club of St Andrews in 2004, has responsibility for upkeep and application of the rules worldwide except in the United States and Mexico, which are the responsibility of the United States Golf Association (USGA).

The term "Rules" can be said to include the following:

- Decisions on the Rules of Golf, a book published every two years by the USGA and R&A to clarify questions raised by the Rules.
- Local rules set by the Committee of a golf club, for example to denote the method used to define the boundaries of the course, ball drops, environmentally sensitive areas (ESAs), etc.
- Rules of golf etiquette, covered by the main book, define the proper behaviour of those playing the game.
- Rules often adopted in competitions, for example the prohibition on using automotive transportation during a round and Rules related to Temporary Immovable Obstructions (TIOs).
- Rules governing the size, shape and performance of golf equipment (clubs and balls) as defined by the R&A/USGA (Appendices I and II).
- Rules governing golfers with disabilities who play in accordance with A Modification of the Rules of Golf for Golfers with Disabilities as published by the R&A and USGA.

Through the course of 2020, the USGA and R&A devised World Handicap System came into effect, replacing the many different handicapping systems in use around the world. While the USGA directly administers the course rating system in its territories, the R&A defers this responsibility to the various national governing bodies.

== Etiquette ==
The Rules of Golf book includes a section on proper etiquette, defining recommendations that make the game safe, enjoyable and fair for all players. While none of these guidelines are enforced by penalty in and of themselves, the course authorities or other local "committee" may, under Rule 33-7, disqualify any player who acts in serious breach of etiquette, thereby violating the "spirit of the game". Such serious breaches include actions made with intent to damage the course, facilities or other players' equipment, to injure other players or disturb/distract them while making their play, to unreasonably hold up or delay other players from continuing their game, or to use any of the Rules or Decisions for the purpose of gaining an unfair advantage over any other player.

== Definitions ==
The rulebook also include definitions of terms used throughout the rule-book (sometimes including examples of what does or does not meet a definition), and defines the use of particular words in context to clarify what is meant by the use of a word. The rules, for instance, differentiate between use of "a" and "the" referring to objects involved in play ("a ball" refers to any ball that can be used in a situation; "the ball" specifically refers to the ball previously mentioned in the Rule), or between "may" (discretionary), "should" (non-binding recommendation) and "must" (binding requirement). Where used in the Rules, the definitions of the terms are binding and must be strictly observed; players must not use a differing definition in order to include or exclude an object involved in play from a particular Rule governing the object.

== Decisions ==
In addition to the Rules and Etiquette, a number of interpretations of the Rules have been published by the USGA/R&A that prescribe the proper procedure in certain situations where the Rules themselves may not be clear. The Decisions are numbered based on the Rule or sub-rule being interpreted and the order in which Decisions were published. When a player has a question, they may ask a rules official who has an actual "Decisions Book".

Decisions may be simple clarifications, define the proper procedure in exceptional or unforeseen cases, or rule that specific actions, equipment or fixtures used by a player or implemented by the committee are legal or illegal. These decisions are binding in situations where they apply, as they define the proper implementation of the Rules themselves. They are not included in most rulebooks, but like the Rules they are available for reference on the USGA website.

== Notable rule changes ==
The biggest change that came with the 2008–2011 edition was a new rule about clubheads not having too much 'spring' effect. This has led to the publishing of lists of conforming and non-conforming drivers.

In 2010 a new rule governing grooves came into force for professional and high-level amateur competition. The change was made in order to decrease the amount of back spin that players were able to produce, particularly from the rough. However, due to a previous legal settlement with Ping following an earlier rule change in the early 1990s, their Eye 2 irons, which were otherwise non-conforming, were deemed legal. This led to a controversy in the early stages of the 2010 PGA Tour season when Phil Mickelson used these irons. While Mickelson's use of the irons was ruled legal, Ping decided to surrender its remaining rights under the now-20-year-old legal settlement, and the original Ping Eye 2 sets are now officially non-conforming. Ping continues to produce a set of wedges with this name and general shape, but these new Ping Eye 2 wedges have conforming face and groove designs.

The 2012–2015 edition was published October 24, 2011. Nine rules were changed, the most significant being Ball Moving After Address (Rule 18-2b). Rory McIlroy was penalized by this Rule in the final round of the 2011 Open Championship.

The 2016 edition added Rule 14-1b, which forbids players from anchoring a club against their body in any way (such as directly against the body or by using their forearm to create an anchor point back to their body). While the rule change is expected to prominently affect the users of long putters, the two governing bodies stated that "the proposed rule narrowly targets only a few types of strokes, while preserving a golfer's ability to play a wide variety of strokes in his or her individual style."

On April 25, 2017, Decision 34-3/10 was issued, which limits the usage of video footage as evidence of certain infractions if the infraction "can't be seen with the naked eye", or the player had done "all that can be reasonably expected to make an accurate estimation or measurement" in order to correctly play or spot their ball, even if video evidence suggests otherwise. Although the sanctioning bodies stated that this was part of an effort to update and modernize the Rules, media outlets considered the ruling to be a response to an incident from the 2017 ANA Inspiration tournament, where Lexi Thompson was retroactively penalized four strokes from her third round score for mis-placing a ball, as reported by a television viewer, going as far as nicknaming it the "Lexi Thompson rule".

Following a lengthy consultation process, the Rules of Golf were completely rewritten and updated with many significant changes, including to some basic terminology. Notable changes included dropping from knee height (previously shoulder), putting out on the green with the flagstick left in (previously incurred a penalty), a defined relief area, reduced search time (3 minutes instead of the previous 5) and ability to repair spike/shoe damage on the green. The new rules came into effect on January 1, 2019.
