= Golf course =

Series of holes designed for the game of golf

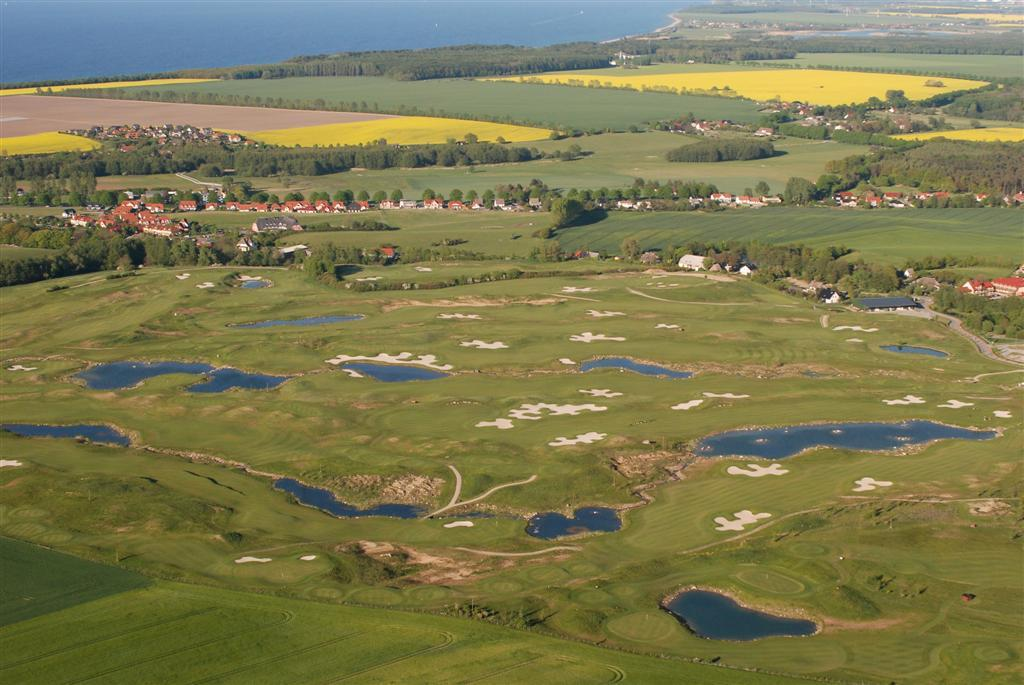
Aerial view of a golf course (Golfplatz Wittenbeck at the Baltic Sea, Germany)

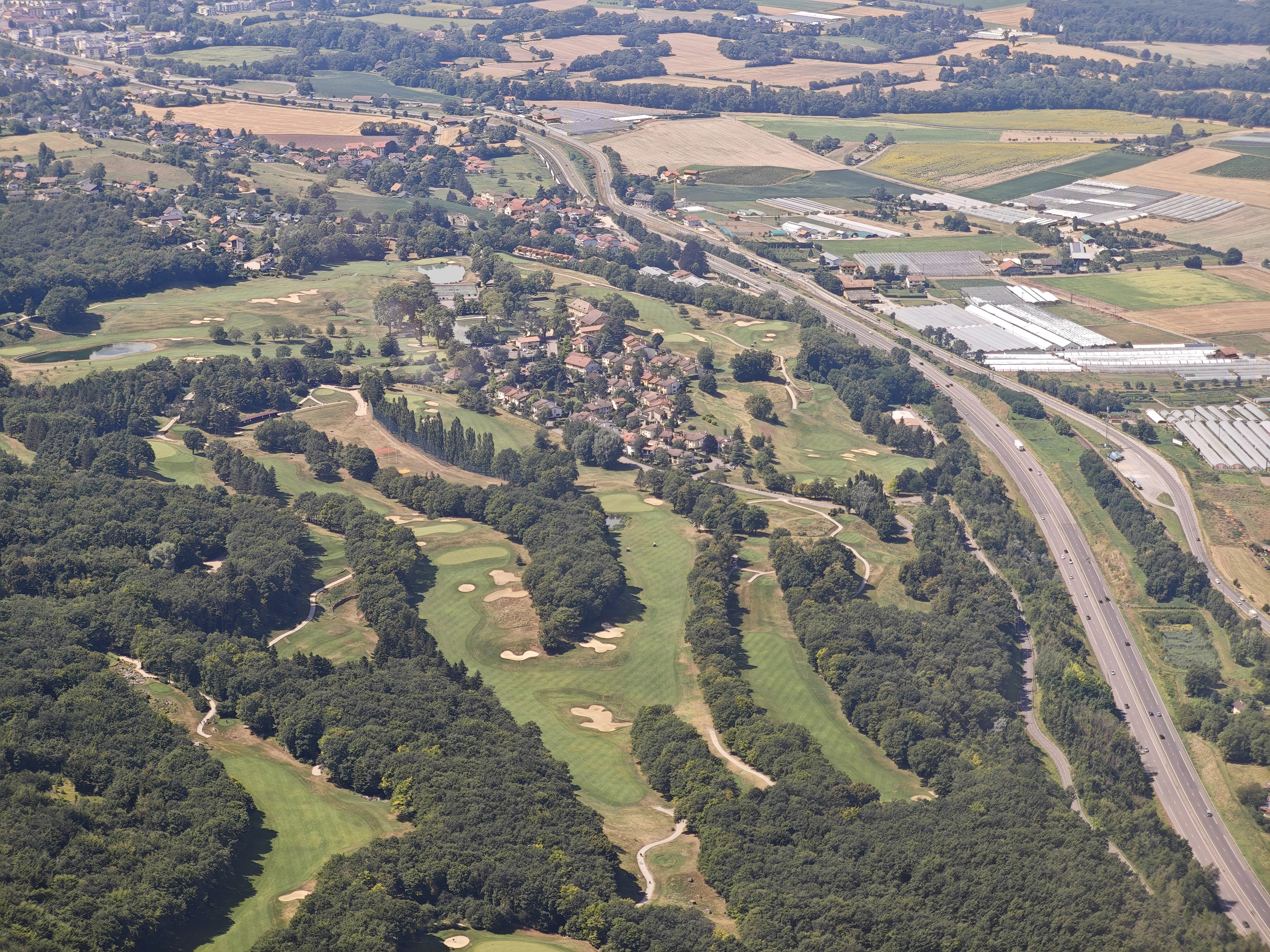
Aerial view of a golf course in France

A golf course is the grounds on which the sport of golf is played. It consists of a series of holes, each consisting of a tee box, a fairway, the rough and other hazards, and a green with a cylindrical hole in the ground, known as a "cup". The cup holds a flagstick, known as a "pin". A standard round of golf consists of 18 holes, and as such most courses contain 18 distinct holes; however, there are many 9-hole courses and some that have holes with shared fairways or greens. There are also courses with a non-standard number of holes, such as 12 or 14.

The vast majority of golf courses have holes of varying length and difficulty that are assigned a standard score, known as par, that a proficient player should be able to achieve; this is usually three, four or five strokes. Par-3 courses consist of holes all of which have a par of three. Short courses have gained in popularity; these consist of mostly par 3 holes, but often have some short par 4 holes.

Many older courses are links, often coastal. The first golf courses were based on the topography of sand dunes and dune slacks with a ground cover of grasses, exposed to the wind and sea. Courses are private, public, or municipally owned, and typically feature a pro shop. Many private courses are found at country clubs.

== History ==
Today, there are approximately 38,000-40,000 golf courses in the world, spanning 200+ countries. The United States has over 40% of all golf courses in the world.

== Design ==
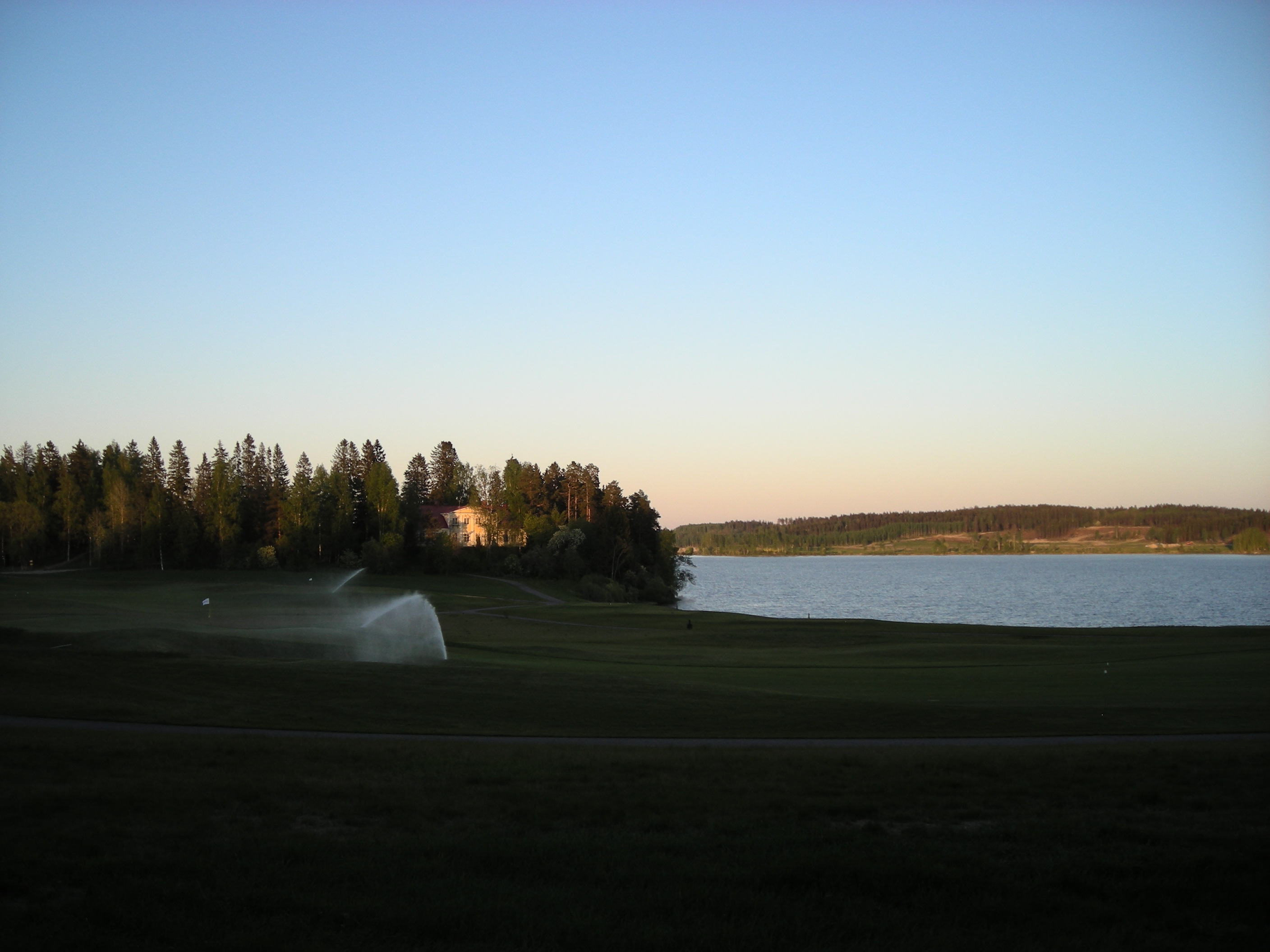
Kytäjä Golf in Kytäjä, Hyvinkää, Finland

Although a specialty within landscape design or landscape architecture, golf course architecture is considered a separate field of study. Some golf course designers become celebrities in their own right, such as Alister MacKenzie; others are professional golfers of high standing and demonstrated appreciation for golf course composition, such as Jack Nicklaus. The field is partially represented by the American Society of Golf Course Architects, the European Institute of Golf Course Architects, and the Society of Australian Golf Course Architects, although many of the finest golf course architects in the world choose not to become members of any such group, as associations of architects are not government-sanctioned licensing bodies, but private groups. While golf courses often follow the original landscape, some modification is unavoidable. This is increasingly the case as new courses are more likely to be sited on less optimal land. Bunkers and sand traps are always built in by architects unless the formation of such items is already in the course's natural terrain.

The layout of a course follows certain traditional principles, such as the number of holes (nine and 18 being most common), their par values, and the number of holes of each par value per course. It is also preferable to arrange greens to be close to the tee box of the next playable hole, to minimize travel distance while playing a round, and to vary the mix of shorter and longer holes. Combined with the need to package all the fairways within what is frequently a compact square or rectangular plot of land, the fairways of a course tend to form an oppositional tiling pattern. In complex areas, two holes may share the same tee box, fairway, or even green. It is also common for separate tee-off points to be positioned for men, women, and amateurs, each one respectively lying closer to the green. Eighteen-hole courses are traditionally broken down into a "front 9" (holes 1–9) and a "back 9" (holes 10–18). On older courses (especially links courses, like the Old Course at St. Andrews), the holes may be laid out in one long loop, beginning and ending at the clubhouse, and thus the front 9 is referred to on the scorecard as "out" (heading out away from clubhouse) and the back 9 as "in" (heading back in toward the clubhouse). More recent courses (and especially inland courses) tend to be routed with the front 9 and the back 9 each constituting a separate loop beginning and ending at the clubhouse. This is partly for the convenience of the players and the club, as then it is easier to play just a 9-hole round, if preferred, or stop at the clubhouse for a snack between the front 9 and the back 9.

Landscape design involves the integration of aesthetic and functional elements. The process includes the arrangement of vegetation, water features, pathways, and structural materials such as stone and wood.

New environmentally responsible design practices mean that a successful design more than harmonizes with the landscaping; it benefits the environment. A successful design also not just pleasing and playable, but is environmentally responsible.

=== Par ===
Most golf courses have only par-3, −4, and −5 holes, although some courses include par-6 holes. The Ananti CC and the Satsuki golf course in Sano, Japan, are the only courses with par-7 holes.

Par is primarily determined by the playing length of each hole from the teeing ground to the putting green. Holes are generally assigned par values between three and five, which includes a regulation number of strokes to reach the green based on the average distance a proficient golfer hits the ball, and two putts. On occasion, factors other than distance are taken into account when setting the par for a hole; these include altitude, terrain and obstacles that result in a hole playing longer or shorter than its measured distance, e.g. route is significantly uphill or downhill, or requiring play of a stroke to finish short of a body of water before hitting over it.

Under the United States Golf Association, the typical distances for the various holes from standard tees are as follows:

Men

- Par 3 – Under 260 yards (240 m)
- Par 4 – 240–490 yards (220–450 m)
- Par 5 – 450–710 yards (410–650 m)
- Par 6 – 670 yards (610 m) or longer

Women

- Par 3 – Under 220 yards (200 m)
- Par 4 – 200–420 yards (180–380 m)
- Par 5 – 370–600 yards (340–550 m)
- Par 6 – 570 yards (520 m) or longer

== Features ==
Golf course features: 1 = teeing area 2 = penalty area 3 = rough 4 = out of bounds 5 = fairway bunker 6 = penalty area 7 = fairway 8 = putting green 9 = flagstick 10 = hole

=== Teeing area ===
The first section of every hole consists of the teeing ground, or tee-box. There is typically more than one available box where a player places his ball, each one a different distance from the hole (and possibly with a different angle of approach to the green or fairway) to provide differing difficulty. The teeing ground is generally as level as feasible, with closely mown grass very similar to that of a putting green, and most are slightly raised from the surrounding fairway.

Each tee box has two markers showing the bounds of the legal tee area. The teeing area spans the distance between the markers, and extends two-club lengths behind the markers. A golfer may stand outside the teeing area, but the ball must be placed and hit from inside it. A golfer may place his ball directly on the surface of the teeing ground (called hitting it "off the deck"), or the ball may be supported by a manufactured tee (limited to a height of four inches), or by any natural substance, such as a mound of sand placed on the teeing surface.

=== Fairway and rough ===
Typical doglegs. Left: "dogleg left". Right: "double dogleg"

After the first shot from the tee ("teeing off"), the player whose ball is farthest from the green hits the ball from where it came to rest; this spot is known as its "lie". When the ball is in play and not out of bounds or in a hazard the player must play the ball as it lies. The area between the tee box and the putting green where the grass is cut even and short is called the fairway. The area between the fairway and the out-of-bounds markers, and also between a mowed apron surrounding the green and out of bounds, is the rough; the grass there is cut higher and is often of a coarser strain than on the fairways, making roughs disadvantageous areas from which to hit. On par-3 holes, the player is expected to be able to drive the ball to the green on the first shot from the tee box. On holes longer than par 3, players are expected to require at least one additional shot to reach their greens.

While many holes are designed with a direct line-of-sight from the teeing ground to the green, a hole may bend either to the left or to the right. This is called a "dogleg", in reference to the similarity to a dog's ankle. The hole is called a "dogleg left" if the hole angles leftwards, and a "dogleg right" if the hole angles rightwards. A hole's direction may bend twice, which is called a "double dogleg".

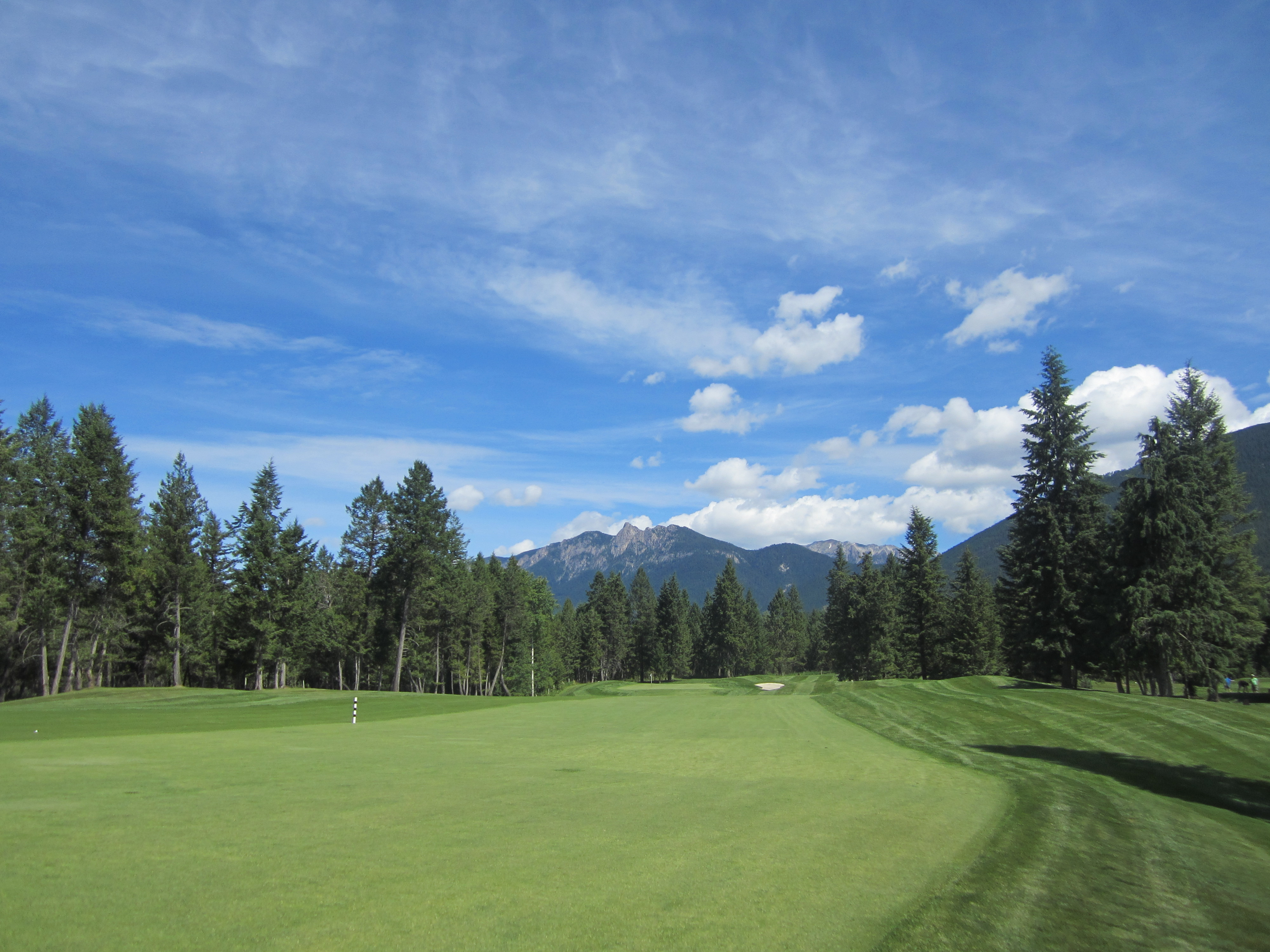
Fairway and rough, Spur Valley Golf Course, Radium Hot Springs, Canada

Just as there are good-quality grasses for putting greens, there are good-quality grasses for the fairway and rough. The quality of grass influences the roll of the ball as well as the ability of the player to "take a divot" (effectively, the ability to hit down into the ball, hitting the ball first, then hitting the turf and removing a portion of it as the club continues its arc). Fairways on prestigious tours, like the PGA Tour, are cut low. Mowing heights influence the play of the course. For example, the grass heights at U.S. Open events are alternated from one hole to the next in order to make the course more difficult. One example of this is the infamous roughs at U.S. Opens, which are often 3 to 5 inches high, depending on how close to the fairway or green the section of grass will be. This makes it difficult for a player to recover after a bad shot.

Variants of grass used for fairways and roughs include bent grass, Tifway 419 Bermuda grass, rye grass, Kentucky bluegrass, and Zoysiagrass. As in putting-green grass types, not every grass type works equally well in all climate types.

=== Greens ===
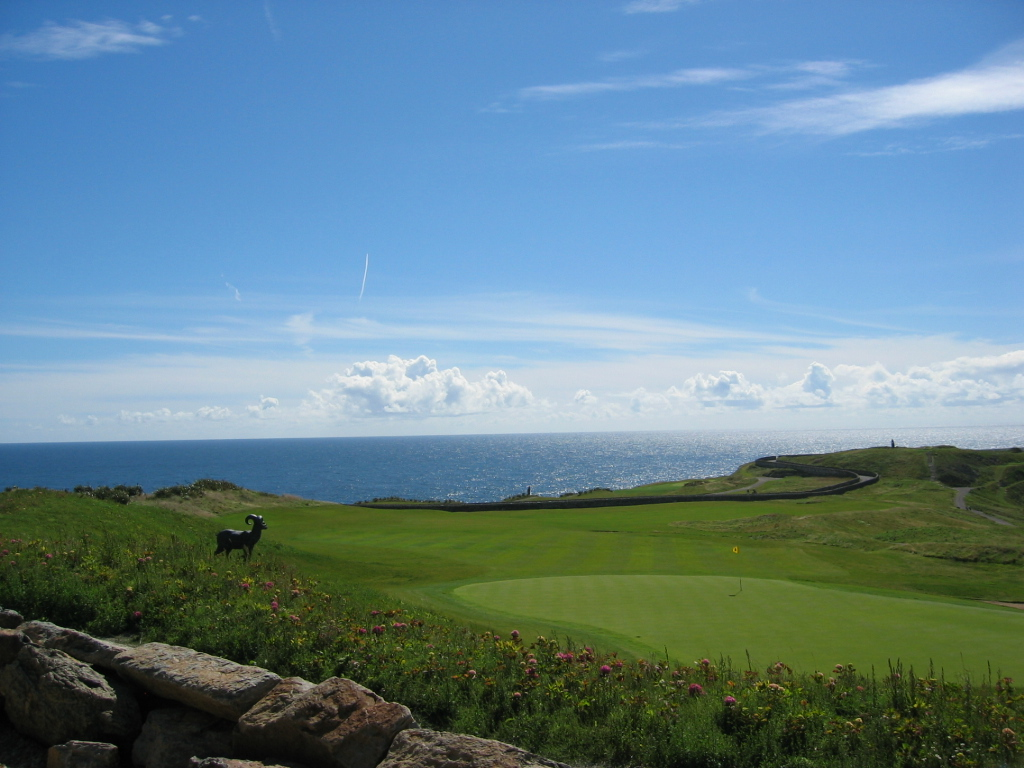
The 18th hole at the Old Head Golf Links on the Old Head of Kinsale

The putting green, or simply the green, is an area of very closely trimmed grass on relatively even, smooth ground surrounding the hole, allowing players to make precision strokes on it. To "putt" is to play a stroke on this surface, usually with the eponymous "putter" club, which has very low loft so that the ball rolls smoothly along the ground, and hopefully into the cup. The shape and topology of the green can vary almost without limit, but for practical purposes the green is usually flatter than other areas of the course, though gentle slopes and undulations can add extra challenge to players who must account for these variations in their putting line. The green typically does not include any fully enclosed hazards such as sand or water; however, these hazards can be — and often are — placed adjacent to the green, and depending on the shape of the green and surrounding hazards, and the location of the hole (which often changes from day to day to promote even wear of the turf of the green), there may not be a direct putting line from a point on the green to the cup.

Golfers use a method known as "reading" the green to enhance their chances of making a putt. Reading a green involves determining the speed, grain, incline, decline and tilt of the green on the line of the putt. Most putts are not struck directly at the hole, instead they must be struck to take into account the characteristics of the green to arrive at the hole at the proper angle and speed. The best players will read the green by walking around the green and studying the characteristics of the green before addressing the ball. Many golfers consider reading the green and putting to be the most difficult part of the game.

The green is typically surrounded by slightly higher grass, cut at a height between that of the green and fairway, and then by the fairway and/or rough. This longer grass surrounding the green is known as the fringe and is designed to slow and stop balls rolling along the green from an approach shot or errant putt, preventing them from exiting the green. Though putting strokes can be made on it, the higher grass can interfere with the path of the ball, so players often choose to use a lofted club such as an iron to make a "chip shot" or a "bump and run", where the ball carries in the air for a few yards and then rolls along the green like a normal putt.

The grass of the putting green (more commonly just "green") is cut very short so that a ball can roll for a long distance. The most common types of greens are for cold winter, but warmer summer regions (i.e., not extremely warm, as in the Southern and Southwestern United States) are bent grass greens. A green may consist of a thin carpet so that bad weather is not allowed to become a serious factor in maintaining the course. These are considered the best greens because they may be cut to an extremely low height, and because they may be grown from seed. Bent grass does not have grain, which makes it superior as a putting surface. However, bent grass may become infested with Poa annua, a costly and time-consuming weed. Augusta National is one of many golf courses to use this type of green. The original design of Augusta National did not include bent grass greens, but in the early 1980s the greens were converted from Bermuda to bent grass. This affected the speed of the greens, making them too quick, and several areas were subsequently remodelled to reduce the slopes and make them more playable. Many other golf courses subsequently made the decision to change from Bermuda to bent grass when they observed increased business at courses that had already changed over.

Another type of grass common for greens is TifDwarf Hybrid Bermuda (other variants exist, but TifDwarf is one of the most common), or simply Bermuda grass. Bermuda is more common in regions that have very warm summers and mild winters, such as the Southern and Southwestern United States. Red Bridge Golf Course was the first course in North Carolina to utilize a special Bermuda called Mini Verde. A green is generally established from sod which has had the soil washed off of it (to avoid soil compatibility problems) and which is then laid tightly over the green, then rolled and topdressed with fine sand. Another common and more economical approach for establishing a putting green is to introduce hybrid Bermuda sprigs (the stolon of the grass which are raked out at the sod farm), which are laid out on the green.

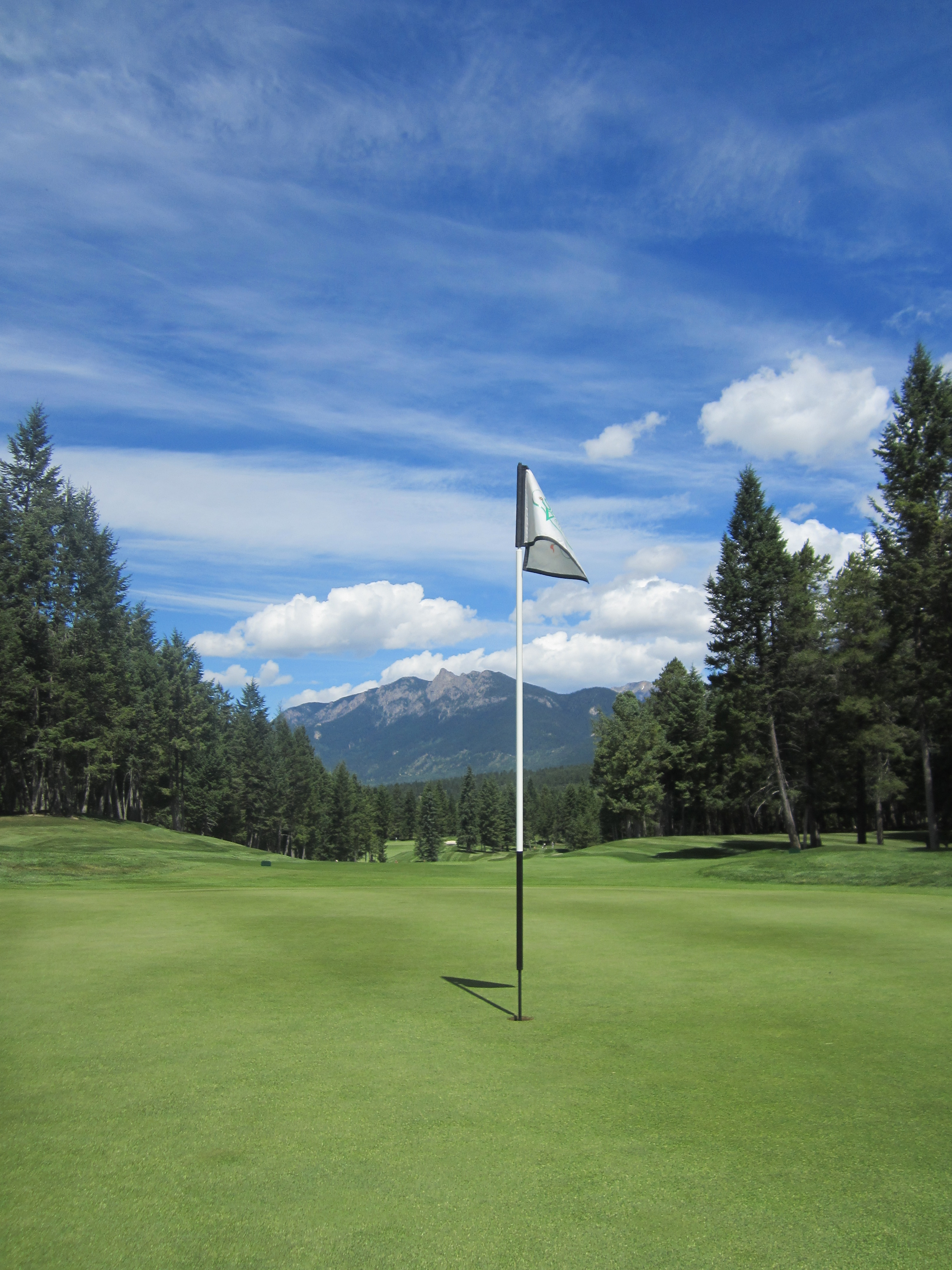
Flagstick at Spur Valley Golf Course

Two downside factors of Bermuda greens are cost of maintenance, and also the existence of grain (the growth direction of the blades of grass), which affects the ball's roll and which is called "the grain of the green" and not to be confused with "the rub of the green" which are idiosyncrasies encountered getting through the hole. The slope or break of the green also affects the roll of the ball. The hole, or cup, is always found within the green and must have a diameter of 108 millimeters (4.25 in) and a depth of at least 10 centimeters (3.94 in). Its position on the green is not fixed and typically is changed daily by a greenskeeper in order to prevent excessive localized wear and damage to the turf. A new hole will be cut by a device that removes a plug of the turf from the ground, and the reinforced cup is then moved, before the old hole is filled in with the plug cut from the new hole and levelled. The hole has a flag on a pole positioned in it so that it may be seen from a distance, but not necessarily from the tee. This location marker is officially called the "flagstick" but is also commonly referred to as the "pin". Flagsticks are made of either coated fiberglass, metal, or wood and have a metal or synthetic bottom (called a ferrule) that is designed to fit in the hole cup.

Putting greens are not all of the same quality. The finest-quality greens are well-kept so that a ball will roll smoothly over the closely mowed grass. Excess water can be removed from a putting green using a machine called a water hog. Golfers describe a green as fast if a light stroke on the ball makes it roll a long distance; conversely, on a slow green a stronger stroke is necessary to roll the ball the same distance. The exact speed of a green can be determined with a stimp meter. By collecting sample measurements, golf courses can be compared in terms of average green speed. It is, however, illegal by the rules of golf to test the speed of a green while playing by rolling a ball on it, or by feeling or rubbing the green.

The cost of installing and maintaining grass greens constitutes a considerable proportion of the expense of installing and maintaining a golf course. To save money, many low budget courses catering to casual players have sand greens instead of real grass. In recent years, artificial turf has also become an increasingly popular surface as a less costly alternative to grass which more closely resembles the appearance and feel of real grass compared to a sand surface.

Design of a green with an elevated front is called a false front, as it deceptively causes the balls hitting this part of the green to roll off back.

=== Hazards ===
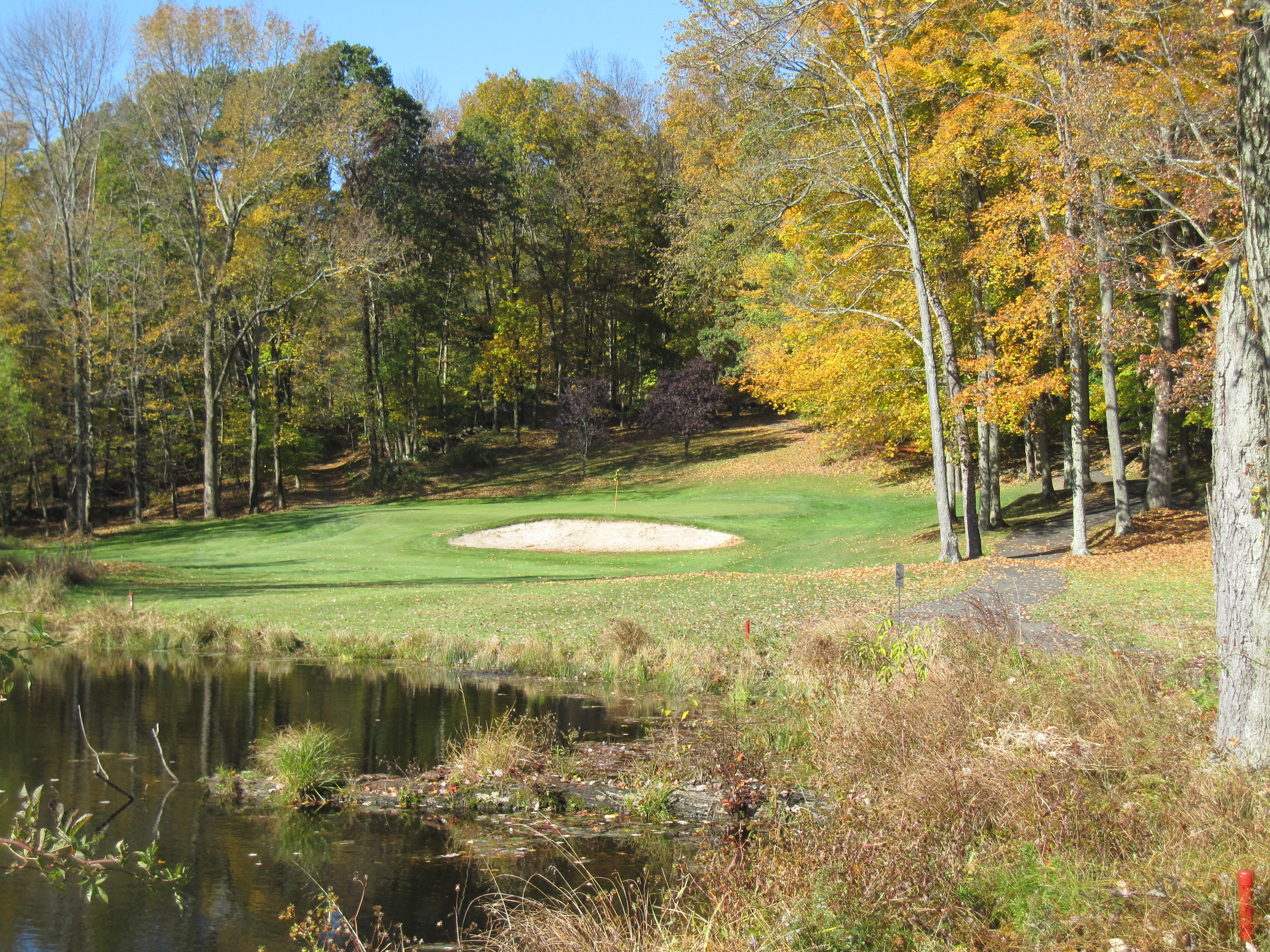
Water hazard, sand trap, and dense vegetation on the 13th hole at Ridgefield Golf Course, Connecticut

Holes often include hazards, which are special areas that have additional rules for play, and are generally of two types: (1) water hazards, such as ponds, lakes, and rivers; and (2) bunkers, or sand traps.

Special rules apply to playing a ball that falls in a hazard. For example, a player may not touch the ground or water with their club before playing the ball, not even for a practice swing. A ball in any hazard may be played as it lies without penalty. If it cannot be played from the hazard, the ball may be hit from another location, generally with a penalty of one stroke. The Rules of Golf specify exactly the point from which the ball may be played outside a hazard. Bunkers are small to medium areas, usually lower than the fairway but of varying topography, that are filled with sand and generally incorporate a raised lip or barrier. It is more difficult to play the ball from sand than from grass, as the ball may embed itself into the sand, and the loose nature of the sand and more severe sloping of many bunkers make taking one's stance more difficult. As in any hazard, a ball in a bunker must be played without touching the sand with the club except during the stroke, and loose impediments (leaves, stones, twigs) must not be moved before making the stroke.

Courses may also have other design features which the skilled player will avoid; there are earth bunkers (pits or depressions in the ground that are not filled with sand but require a lofted shot to escape), high grass and other dense vegetation, trees or shrubs, ravines and other rocky areas, steep inclines, etc.; while disadvantageous to play from, these are typically not considered "hazards" unless specifically designated so by the course (a ravine or creek bed may be termed a "water hazard" even if completely dry)

=== Driving range ===
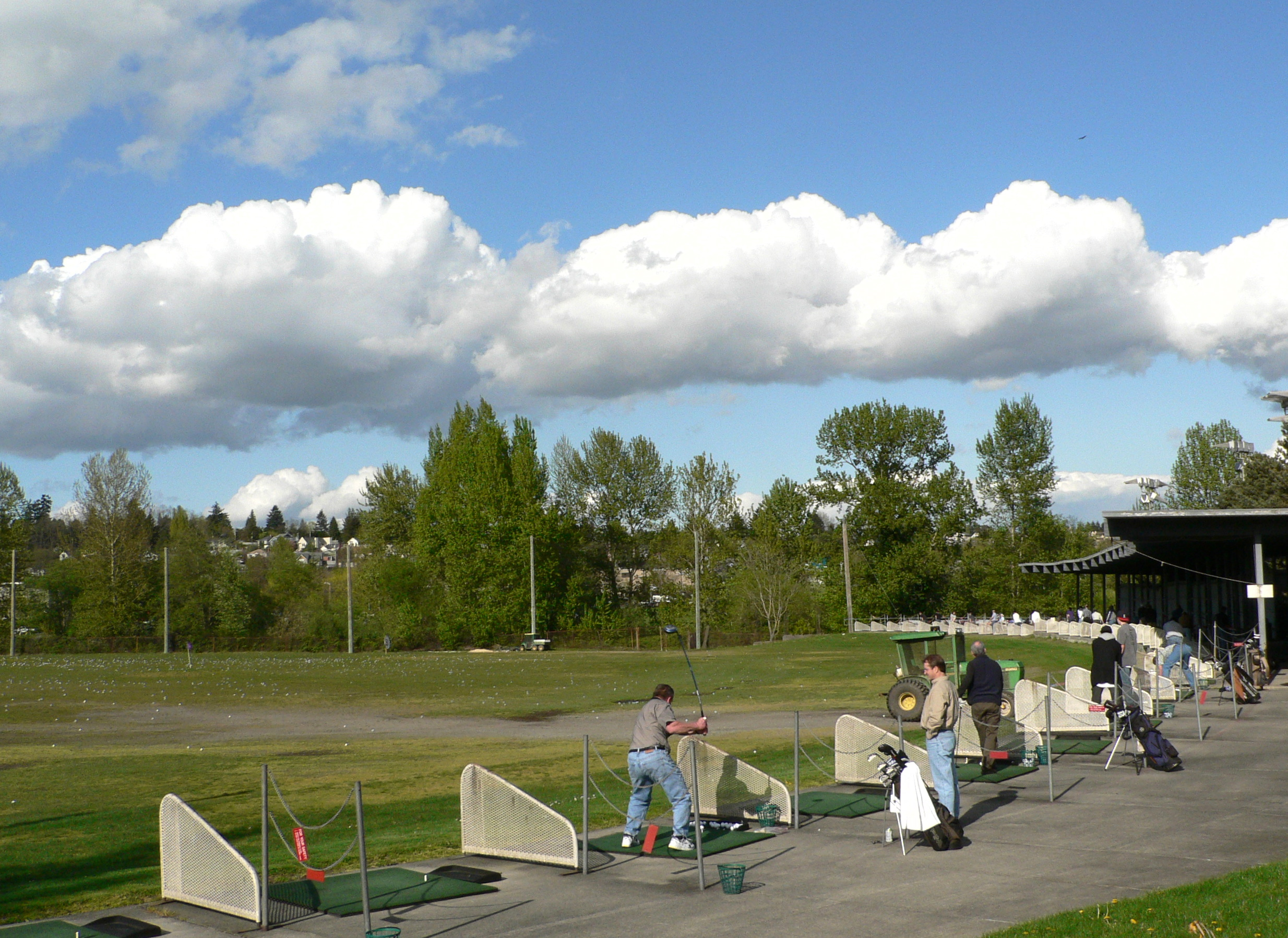
Practice range with 43 tees (20 covered)

Often, a golf course will include among its facilities a practice range or driving range, usually with practice greens, bunkers, and driving areas. Markers showing distances are usually included on a practice range for the golfer's information. Driving ranges are also commonly found as separate facilities, unattached to a golf course, where players may simply hit balls into the range for practice or enjoyment.

There may even be a practice course (often shorter and easier to play than a full-scale course), where players may measure the distance they can obtain with a specific club, or in order to improve their swing technique. Practice courses often consist of old holes of a previous design that are kept and maintained for practice purposes or as substitute holes if one or more holes become unplayable; a 21-hole golf course, for instance, will have three additional holes that can be used for practice or as substitutes for a flooded or otherwise damaged hole.

Many courses also have a practice green with multiple holes on them to practice putting and chip shots.

=== Signature hole ===
Many golf courses have what may be referred to as a "signature hole". This will commonly be the most memorable, aesthetically pleasing or photogenic hole.

== Types ==
=== Links ===
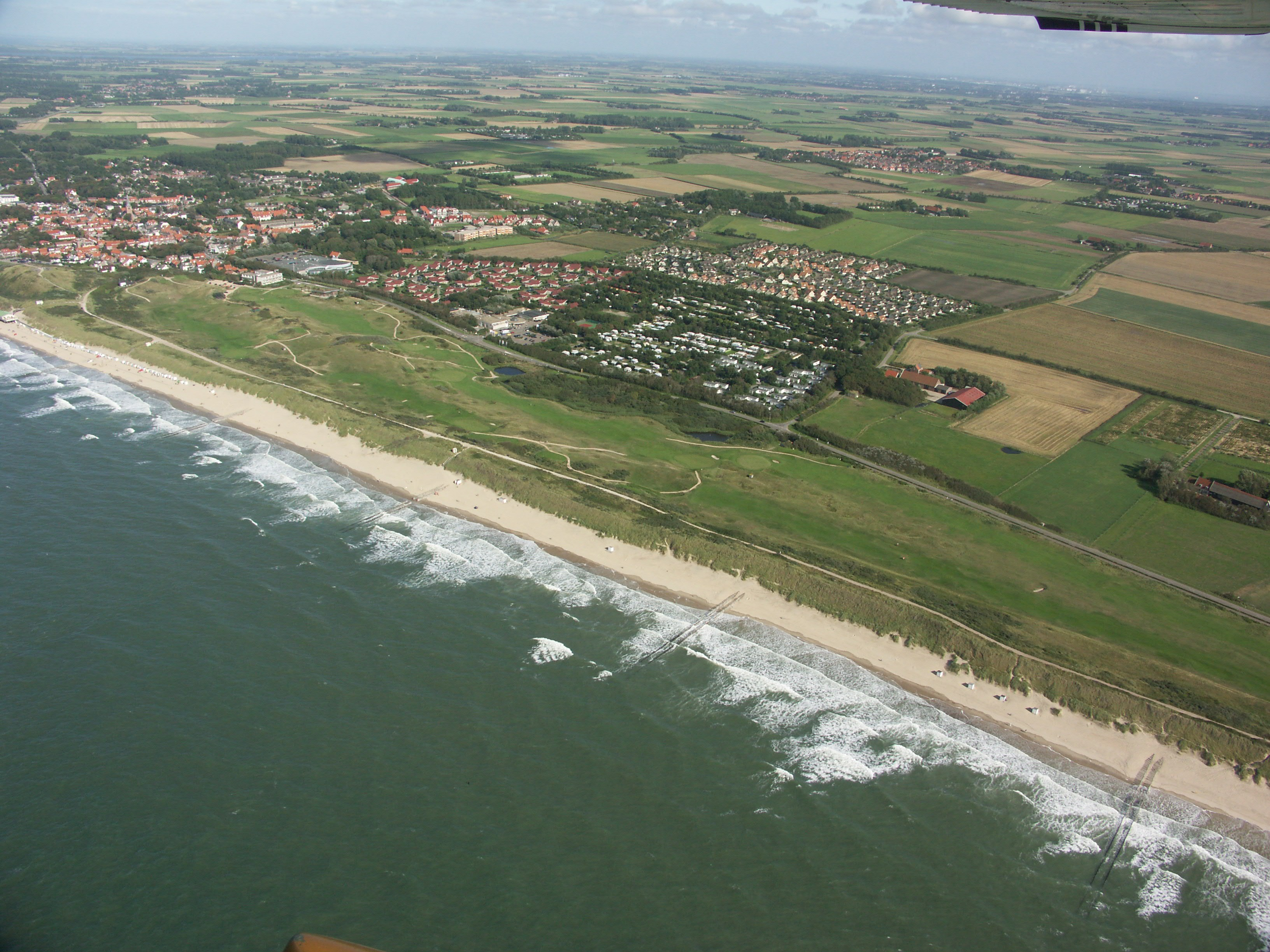
Domburgsche, a links course in the Netherlands

Links is a Scottish term, from the Old English word hlinc : "rising ground, ridge", describing coastal sand dunes and sometimes similar areas inland. It is on links land near the towns of central eastern Scotland that golf has been played since the 15th century.

The shallow topsoil and sandy subsoil made links land unsuitable for the cultivation of crops or for urban development and was of low economic value. The links were often treated as common land by the residents of the nearby towns and were used by them for recreation, animal grazing and other activities such as laundering clothes.

The closely grazed turf and naturally good drainage of the links was ideal for golf, and areas of longer grass, heather, low growing bushes and exposed sand provided the hazards that are familiar on modern courses. Although early links courses were often close to the sea it was rarely used as a hazard, perhaps due to the instability of the dunes closest to the water and the high cost of hand-made golf balls precluding anything that could result in their irrecoverable loss. The land is naturally treeless and this combined with their coastal location makes wind and weather an important factor in links golf.

Traditional links courses are often arranged with holes in pairs along the coastline; players would play "out" from the town through a series of holes to the furthest point of the course, and then would return "in" along the second set of holes. The holes may share fairways and sometimes greens (such as at St Andrews to economize on land use, but in modern times this is rare due to the potential for injury from balls coming the other way.

Famous links courses include the Old Course at St. Andrews, often described as the "Home of Golf", and Musselburgh Links, which is generally regarded as the first recorded golf course. The Open Championship, the oldest of golf's major championships, is always played on a links course. Links and links-style golf courses have been developed throughout the world, reproducing the broken, treeless terrain with deep bunkers of their Scottish prototypes.

=== Executive ===
An executive course or short course is a course with a total par significantly less than that of a typical 18-hole course. Two main types exist:

- A "9-hole course", typically the type referred to as an "executive course", has only 9 holes instead of 18, but with the otherwise normal mix of par-3, par-4 and par-5 holes (typically producing a par score of between 34 and 36), and the course can be played through once for a short game, or twice for a full round.
- A "par-3" course has either 9 or 18 holes, and the distance of each hole is a par 3 rating (typically 240 yards or less from the "men's" tee), with no par-4 or par-5 holes mandating shots through the green (though, occasionally, a "par-3" course may feature a par-4 or even a par-5 hole). As a result, the total par for 18 holes of a par-3 course would be 54 instead of a typical 68–72. Some par-3 courses still require the use of a wood on some tee shots, and thus a "complete" set of clubs is used.
  - A common standardized type of par-3 course is the "Pitch and Putt" course, where each of the 9 or 18 holes has a distance from tee to cup of less than 100 yards, with an overall 18-hole course distance no more than 1,200 yards (so each hole averages 67 yards). This allows the course to be played without a full set of clubs; typically only wedges are needed, possibly a 9-iron for the longest holes, along with a putter, to play the course. The rules for formal Pitch and Putt competitions mandate a three-club limit, consisting of two irons and one putter.

These types of courses provide a faster pace of play than a standard course, and get their name from their target patronage of business executives who would play the course on a long lunch or as part of a meeting. They are also popular with young professionals, because during the normal golf season, the course can usually be played in the time between the end of the work day and sundown.

The popularity of the 9-hole course has waned in recent decades; a full 18-hole course still allows for the player to play only the "front nine" or "back nine" as a shorter game, while attracting more golfers seeking to play a traditional full round of 18 distinct holes. Many older executive courses have been upgraded "in-place" to 18 holes and a traditional par score, or the original course was sold for other development, and new land was acquired and built into an 18-hole course. By contrast, par-3 courses, especially Pitch and Putt, are rising in popularity as a compromise between the long play time and high skill levels required of a traditional 18-hole course, and the artificial nature and single-minded putting focus of miniature golf. Pitch and Putt, specifically its governing association the IPPA, has received financial support and logo rights from the R&A.

In 2014, the PGA Tour held a Champions Tour event on a nine-hole par-3 course, the Big Cedar Lodge Legends of Golf in Ridgedale, Missouri, with four (regular division) or three (over-65 division) rounds played over the par-3 course, and one round played on a nearby regulation 18-hole course with par of 71.

=== Pitch and putt ===
The "par 3" or pitch and putt course in Shibden Hall, England

Pitch and putt is an amateur sport, similar to golf and is also known as chip and putt. The maximum hole length for international competitions is 90 metres (100 yd) with a maximum total course length of 1,200 metres (1,310 yd). Players may only use three clubs; one of which must be a putter. The game is played from raised artificial teeing surfaces using a tee and it has its own handicap system.

== Ownership and management ==
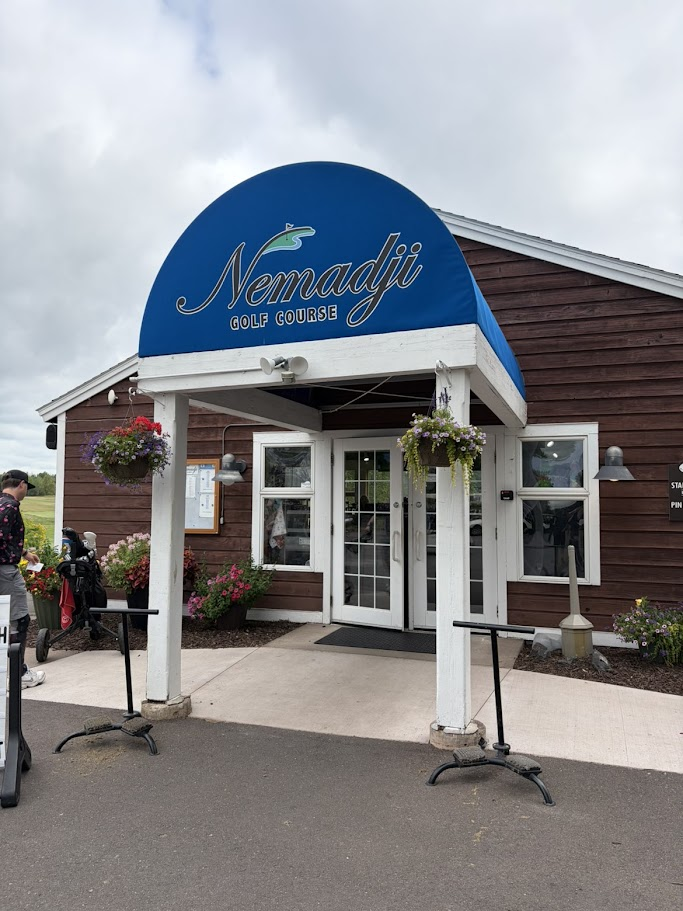
Entrance to the Pro Shop at Nemadji Golf Course a municipally owned course in Superior, Wisconsin

There are three main categories of ownership and management of a golf course: private, commercial, and municipal.

=== Private ===
A private course is owned and managed by a golf club on behalf of its members, on a non-profit basis. Many of the courses opened during the golf booms in the late 19th and early 20th centuries are of this type. Some courses, such as Augusta National, are highly exclusive and will only allow visitors to play at the invitation of and alongside a member of the club. Others allow visitors at certain times but may insist on advance booking and proof of golfing competency.

=== Commercial ===
A commercial course is owned and managed by a private organization and is operated for profit. They may be constructed to provide a core or supplementary attraction for visitors to a hotel or commercial resort, as the centrepiece to a real estate development, as an exclusive Country Club, or as a "Pay and Play" course open to the general public. Notable examples include Pinehurst in the US and Gleneagles in Scotland.

=== Municipal ===
A municipal course is owned and managed by a local government body for the benefit of residents and visitors. Some of the historic Scottish golf courses, including St Andrews and Carnoustie fall into this category along with Bethpage and Pebble Beach in the US and many others of less renown. It is increasingly common for the management of municipal courses to be contracted out to commercial or other organisations or the course to be sold or shut down completely.

=== Associated clubs ===
Sign at Tanners Brook Golf Club in Forest Lake, Minnesota

Many commercial and municipal establishments have associated golf clubs, who arrange competitions for their members on the courses and may provide clubhouse facilities. In the UK particularly, some older private members clubs have an associated "Artisan" club, originally established to provide low-cost golf with limited playing rights in exchange for unpaid work on the course. These associated clubs may be totally independent organizations from the course management, or may have various degrees of formal or informal links.

== Golf courses around the world ==
As per 2019 there were 38,864 golf courses around the world. A 2019 study revealed that 78% of the world's supply of golf courses are located in 10 countries: the United States, Japan, Canada, England, Australia, Germany, France, South Korea, Sweden and Scotland.

Country	Golf courses	Percentage of total world golf courses
USA	16,752	43.10%
Japan	3,169	8.15%
Canada	2,633	6.77%
England	2,270	5.84%
Australia	1,616	4.16%
Germany	1,050	2.70%
France	804	2.07%
South Korea	798	2.05%
Sweden	662	1.70%
Scotland	614	1.58%
China	599	1.54%
Spain	497	1.28%
Ireland	494	1.27%
South Africa	489	1.26%
New Zealand	418	1.08%
Argentina	349	0.90%
Denmark	346	0.89%
Netherlands	330	0.85%
Italy	321	0.83%
Thailand	315	0.81%

== Environmental impact ==
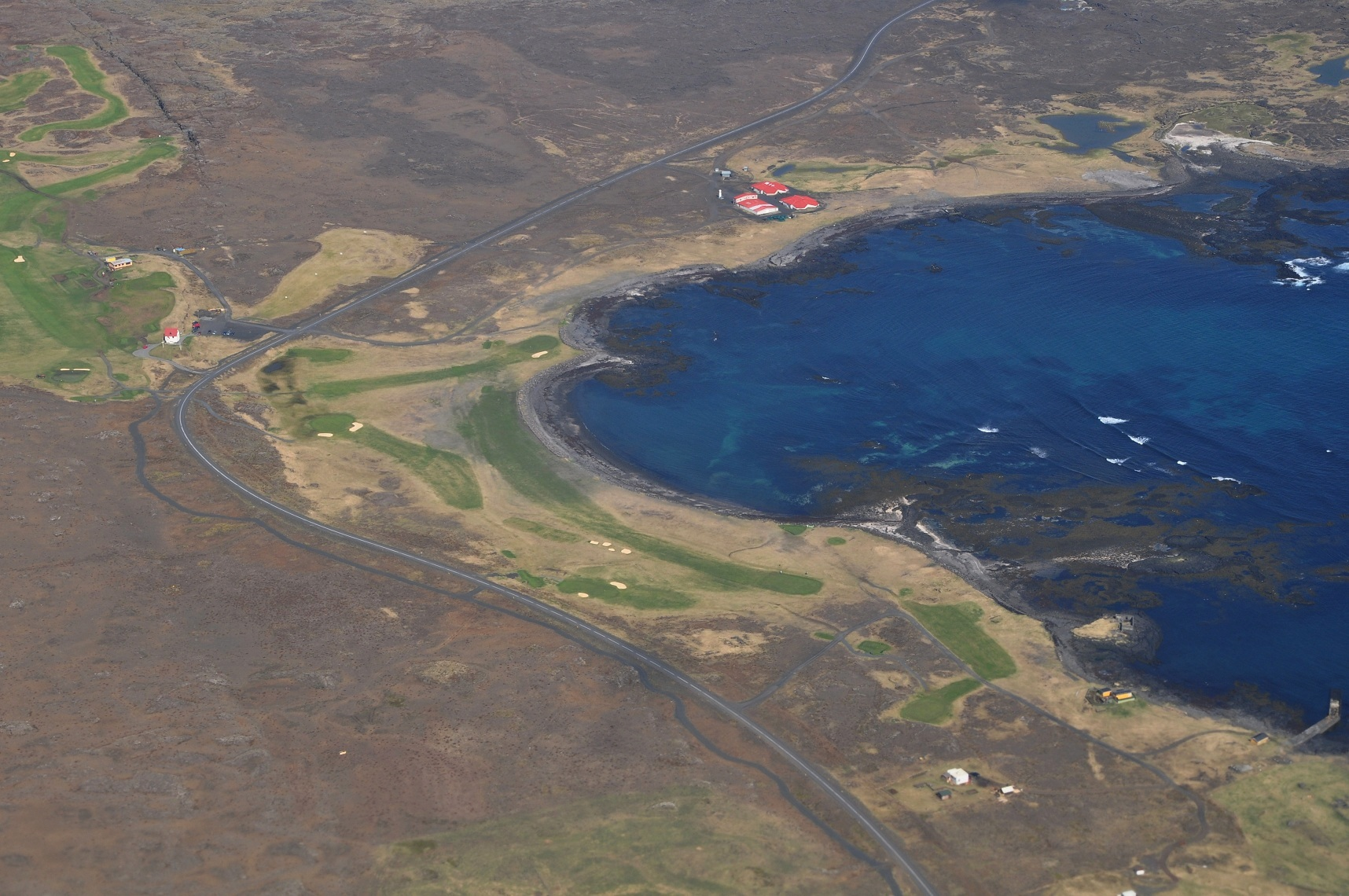
Golf course in Grindavík, Iceland in May 2011, amid the barren lava fields

Environmental concerns over the use of land for golf courses have grown since the 1960s. Specific issues include the amount of water required for irrigation and the use of chemical pesticides and fertilizers in maintenance, as well as the destruction of wetlands and other environmentally important areas during construction.

=== Pesticides and fertilizers ===
These pesticides run off into bodies of water and cause overflowing of pesticides into water which causes algae blooms that disrupt local ecosystems. Some pesticides can also leach through soil and reach groundwater. The extent of leaching depends on factors such as the chemical properties of the pesticides and the conditions of the soil including the movement of the water in the soil. The environmental effects of pesticide runoff vary among chemicals. A study of pesticide runoff from found that concentrations of chlorothalonil, iprodione, and pentachloronitrobenzene in fairway runoff often exceed concentrations that are safe for aquatic organisms. While this is true, there are some pesticides that are safe. Propiconazole, and thiophanate-methyl were detected at concentrations well below levels that are considered dangerous.

The U.S. Environmental Protection Agency prohibited the use of Diazinon on golf courses and sod farms because of its negative impact on bird species in 1988.

A 2023 study of 68 golf courses in the United States and Europe found that pesticide risk was lower in the United Kingdom, Norway, and Denmark, where course managers had access to 20 or fewer pesticide ingredients. In comparison, course managers in the United States have access to between 200 to 250 active ingredients depending on the state. Some courses have made an effort to decrease their use of fertilizers. In a study conducted On US golf courses between 2007 and 2014, it was found that courses decreased their annual nutrient use by 34% for nitrogen, 52% for phosphorus pentoxide, and 42% for potassium oxide. The lowest rates of annual reduction in nutrients were found in cool climates and the highest reduction rates were found in warmer climates.

=== Irrigation ===
The United States Golf Association (USGA) reported in 2012 that in the U.S. golf course irrigation used approximately 2.08 billion gallons of water per day to irrigate its golf courses. The United Nations estimates that, worldwide, golf courses consume about 2.5 billion gallons/9.5 billion liters of water per day.

In 2022 the U.S. Geological Survey reported that the state of Utah uses about 38 million gallons of water on its golf courses per day - enough water to fill almost 58 Olympic-sized swimming pools.

In 2025 a survey data by the Golf Course Superintendents Association of America that was funded in part by the United States Golf Association Golf courses used 31% less water compared to 2005, with two-thirds of the reported decline likely being caused by operational golf facilities applying water more efficiently, through the use of new watering technology as well as through increased use of best management practices to water courses.

=== Carbon footprint ===
Studies have also found that golf courses take up 2,244,415 acres of land nationwide. A golf course's carbon footprint is ten times greater than an average person's everyday life.

A result of modern equipment is that today's players can hit the ball much farther than previously. As a result, because of demand from course customers who possess this enhanced equipment, and also out of an expressed concern for safety, golf course architects have had to lengthen and widen golf courses. Where a 7,000-yard course used to be a great rarity, courses measuring 7,500-yards are now common, and courses of 8,000-yards are being contemplated. All this has led to a ten-percent increase in the acreage required to build a typical course.

Environmental concerns, along with concerns about cost and human health, have led to research into more environmentally sound practices and turf grasses. The USGA shares best management practices and case studies of U.S. golf courses, on topics such as irrigation efficiency, use of recycled water, storm water infrastructure, native grasses, and increasing pollinator habitat. Golf course superintendents are often trained in the uses of these practices and grasses. This has led to significant reduction in the amount of water and chemicals on courses. Golf course turf is an excellent filter for water and has been used in communities to cleanse grey water, such as incorporating them into bioswales.

The use of natural creeks and ponds is generally desirable when designing a golf course for their aesthetics and the increase in playing difficulty. However, such areas also typically include wetlands within the flood plain that are unsuitable for golfing and are often filled in and raised to remain dry. In arid areas, dry creek beds can be marked as "water hazards", but the importation of non-native grasses and other plant life can have a detrimental effect on native landscapes, often requiring non-native soil and large quantities of water and fertilizer to maintain the course. In these areas, course builders are often prohibited from growing and maintaining non-native grass on areas of the course other than the fairway, or even on the fairway itself, in which case only greens are allowed to have grass.

Water restrictions established by communities have forced courses to limit the amount of maintained turf grass. While most modern 18-hole golf courses occupy as much as 60 hectares (150 acres) of land, the average course has 30 hectares (74 acres) of maintained turf.

Golf courses can be built on sandy areas along coasts, on abandoned farms, among strip mines, and quarries, and in deserts and forests. Many Western countries have instituted environmental restrictions on where and how courses are allowed to be built. The problem in today's society with building multibillion-dollar courses is that it takes the place for much better use of land. Those methods of use include building communities for the homeless and under privileged, national parks and forests for tourism, growth of wildlife, and animals to roam free. There is also a problem with giving up farm land which is a top necessity in the US economy which causes problems in the supply chain.

In some parts of the world, attempts to build courses and resorts have led to protests, vandalism, and violence. Populists perceive golf as an elitist activity, and thus golf courses become a target for popular opposition. Resisting golf tourism and golf's expansion has become an objective of some land-reform movements, especially in the Philippines.

In The Bahamas, opposition to golf developments has become a national issue. Residents of Great Guana Cay and Bimini, for example, are engaged in legal and political opposition to golf developments on their islands, for fear the golf courses will destroy the nutrient-poor balance on which their coral reef and mangrove systems depend.

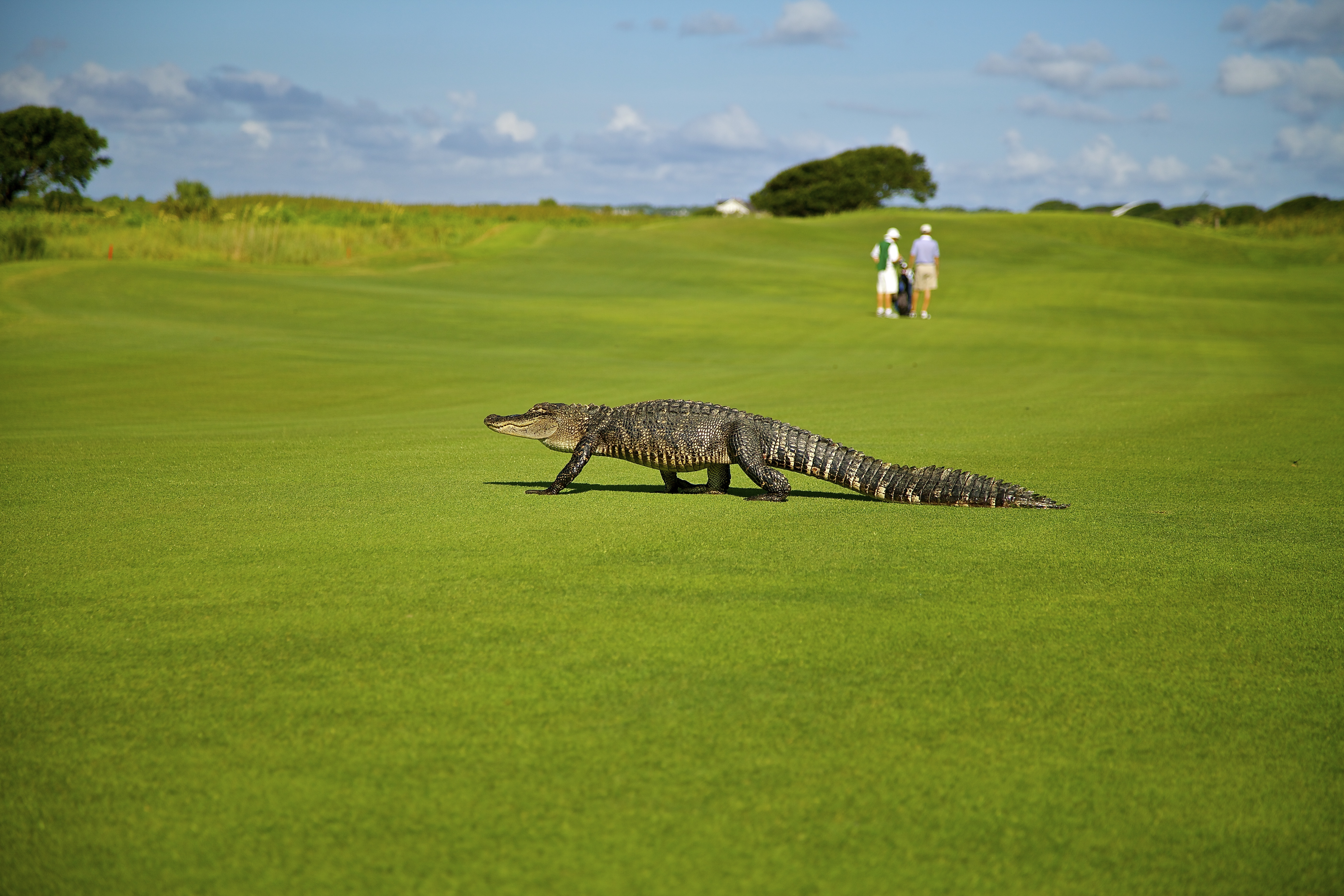
Golf courses can provide habitats for large animals, such as this American alligator. This particular species often inhabits golf courses within its native range due to the courses providing ample amounts of water and food.

In Saudi Arabia and elsewhere in arid regions, golf courses have been constructed on nothing more than oil-covered sand. Players may use a roller on the "greens" to smooth the intended path before putting. In November 2022, four Saudi Arabian golf courses were certified by the GEO foundation that solidifies those courses pledge and to higher the sustainability in the courses in the area and to improve economic output. This act was supported by very strict laws in Saudi Arabia including stewardship, carbon and climate footprint reduction, and restoration of the economy as well.

A course in Coober Pedy, Australia, consists of nine holes dug into mounds of sand, diesel fuel, and oil, with no grass appearing anywhere on the course. Players carry a small piece of astroturf from which they tee the ball. Other Australian golf courses in locations where water is scarce or water conservation is a priority sometimes feature "scrapes" in place of greens. These are made of fine dirt which requires raking between uses but does not require watering.

=== Impact on biodiversity and wildlife ===
Despite oftentimes being perceived as having a negative impact on wildlife, golf courses can be a "safe haven" for many different species. For example, the longer grass, referred to as the rough, are home to different plant species which provide nutrients and shelter for many animals native to the golf course. Golf courses also have many creeks, streams and ponds, which are the home for many different species, like fish, frogs and even alligators in some courses in the Southeast United States. In many places, like Melbourne, Australia, golf courses have proven to be a great quality habitat for local wildlife, when compared to alternative uses of land, like suburban streets. Also, outside of golfers playing golf on the course, they are relatively shielded from harmful human activities, like driving cars, noise pollution and light pollution.

However, negative impacts do exist, as the use of pesticides and fertilizers can harm soil and water on or around the golf course. Mowing of grass on golf courses can also harm diversity of certain insect species native to that land. Since golf courses are an example of chemical-intensive land, native species, like certain amphibians. Golf courses also tend to be the home of many pests, like rats and toads, which can severely harm species native to the land.

=== Programs to address environmental issues ===
Audubon International has an educational and certification program for golf courses to achieve higher environmental standards and become a Certified Audubon Cooperative Sanctuary. The Golf Course Superintendents Association of America (GCSAA) has developed a program to provide best environmentally sustainable management practices for each state in the U.S.

While golf courses are a big contributor to pollution and global warming, there have been good efforts to evolve golf into a game which helps the environment and not the opposite, of destroying it. Golf courses often create large green spaces that serve as habitats for various plants and animals. Some courses incorporate natural features and wildlife corridors, contributing to biodiversity. This is a big step forward in the movement towards a greener environment. Golf courses as a whole also typically require substantial water for irrigation. Properly managed courses can showcase efficient water management practices, such as the use of reclaimed water or sustainable irrigation systems. These are the first crucial stages to conquer environmental issues and the problems within the golf industry. The sustainability issue hits when animals and non-invasive plant life are displaced and there are alteration and distortion to many prominent swamps, wetlands, and other prominent wildlife fixtures.

=== Land use and taxation ===
Various people have proposed taking the extensive land used for golf courses and converting that land to affordable housing.

In many states, the method of taxation of the land used for the golf course is controversial. Real and personal property is, in most states, assessed based on fair market value, the value of its "highest and best use." However, in some states golf courses are taxed by current use assessment.

=== Abandoned golf courses ===
The closure of golf courses has increased in recent decades, particularly in the United States, where more than 1,500 facilities shut down during the early 21st century. Similar patterns have been reported in parts of Asia and Australia, where participation rates have declined and the rising cost of land has made golf less financially viable. The closure of these facilities creates a set of ecological and social considerations that vary by region and land management practices.

One environmental consequence of abandonment is the spread of invasive species. Without mowing, irrigation, and turf maintenance, fast-growing plants can dominate former fairways and greens, often replacing native vegetation and altering habitat structure. In tropical regions, plant succession can occur rapidly; for example, Chromolaena odorata has been observed to expand across unmanaged land. The discontinuation of pesticide and fertilizer applications may also allow soils and nearby waterways to recover from previous chemical use, although outcomes depend on site conditions and management after closure.

Built infrastructure can also deteriorate once maintenance stops. Many golf courses include artificial ponds, canals, and drainage systems designed for irrigation. If left unmanaged, these systems can stagnate, affecting water quality and potentially creating habitats for mosquitoes or other pests. In coastal areas, erosion may increase when turf and stabilizing vegetation die back due to the loss of irrigation.

Abandoned courses can influence surrounding communities as well. In residential areas, closed courses are sometimes described as visual blight, and nearby property values may decline following closure. In areas that depend on tourism, abandoned facilities can affect local economies and the image of resort developments. Local governments and homeowners’ associations often face decisions regarding whether to redevelop, conserve, or sell these sites.

Some former golf courses have been converted for alternative uses. Documented examples include conversion into public parks, restored wetlands, or community greenways that provide ecological and recreational functions. In the United States, the American Society of Landscape Architects reported that since 2010 at least 20 defunct courses have been turned into public parks and natural areas. One example is the Rancho Vistoso Golf Club in Oro Valley, Arizona, which closed in 2018 and was converted into a 202-acre nature preserve with hiking trails and native vegetation. Other projects in Florida, Texas, and California have focused on wetland restoration, stormwater management, and the creation of community open space.

Research has identified potential environmental benefits from such reuse, including improved stormwater absorption, reduced runoff, and habitat connectivity. The extent of these benefits depends on local ecological conditions and management objectives. Because many golf courses are located in densely developed or flood-prone areas, their reuse has been examined within broader discussions of urban planning and green infrastructure.

In some countries, redevelopment takes different forms. In Japan and South Korea, where golf expanded during the late 20th century but later declined, closed courses have been repurposed for solar power installations or agricultural production. These projects illustrate how the outcomes of course closures vary with local policy, economic incentives, and environmental priorities.

Although golf facilities have been criticized for high water use, chemical inputs, and land conversion, abandonment and reuse can offer opportunities to mitigate some of these effects. Managing closed courses is part of ongoing discussions on sustainable land use and community planning.

== Gallery ==
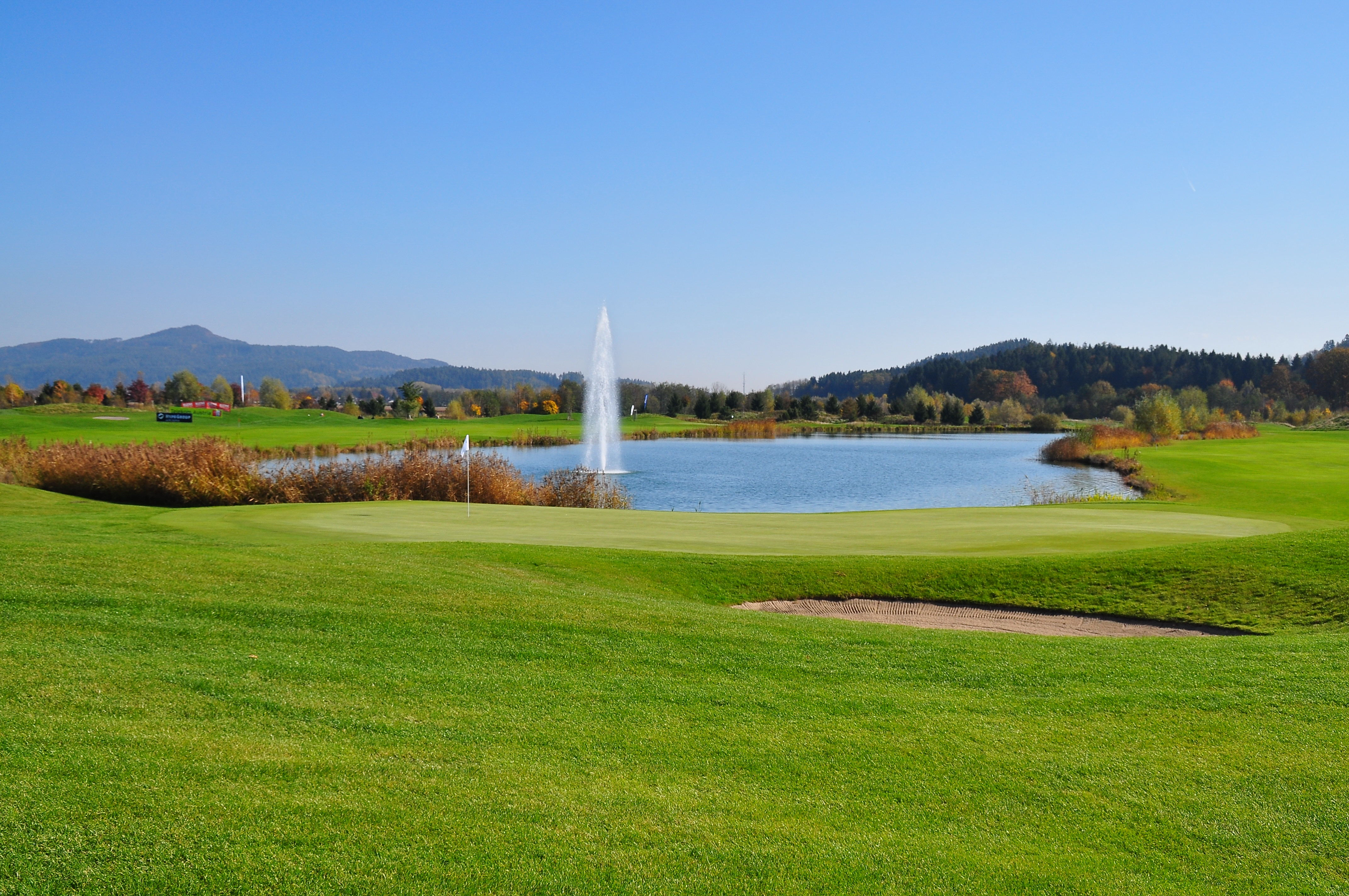
Fountain pond at Seltenheim Golf Course Klagenfurt-Seltenheim, Austria

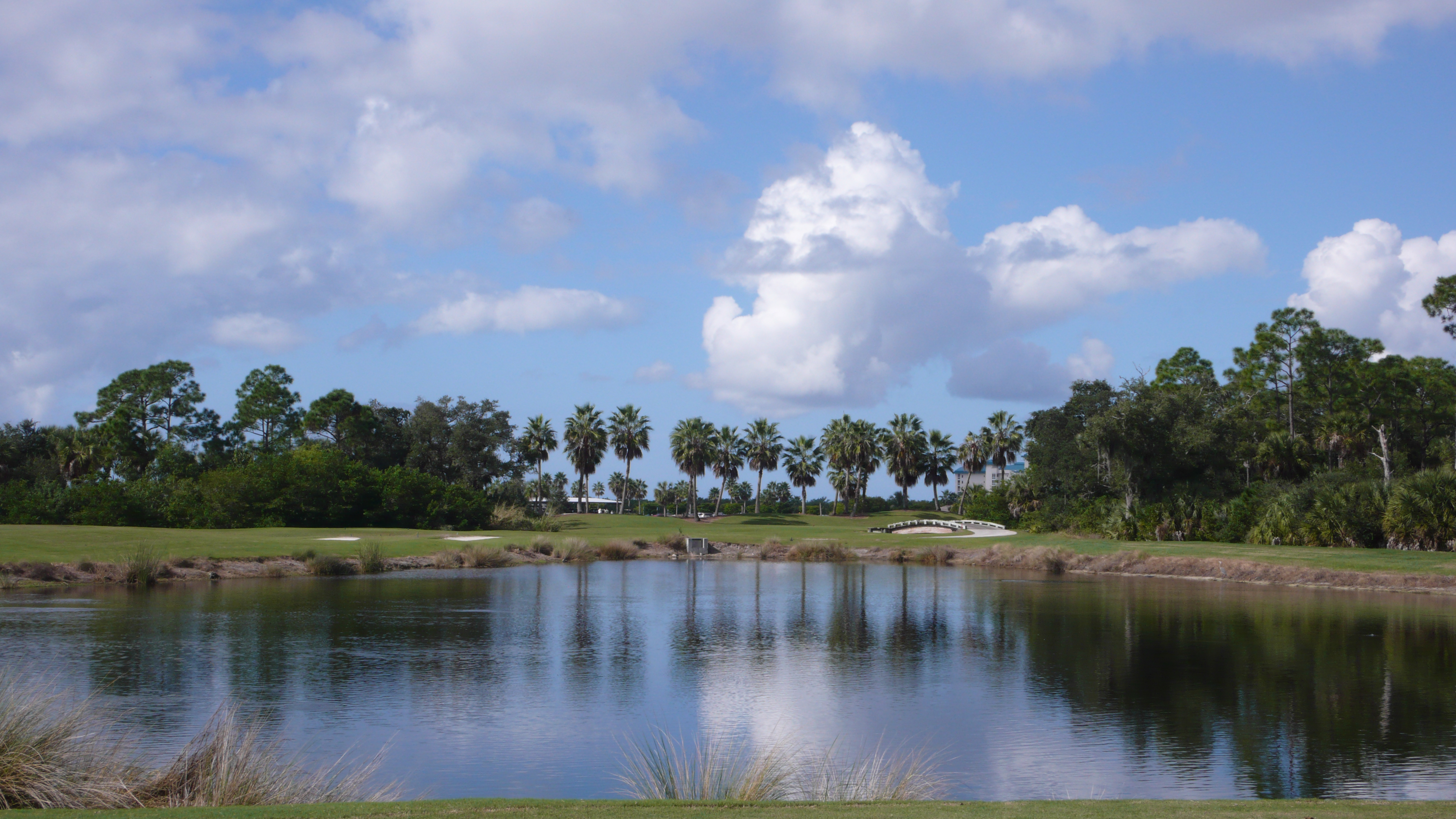
Water feature at the Shell Point Golf Course, Iona, Florida

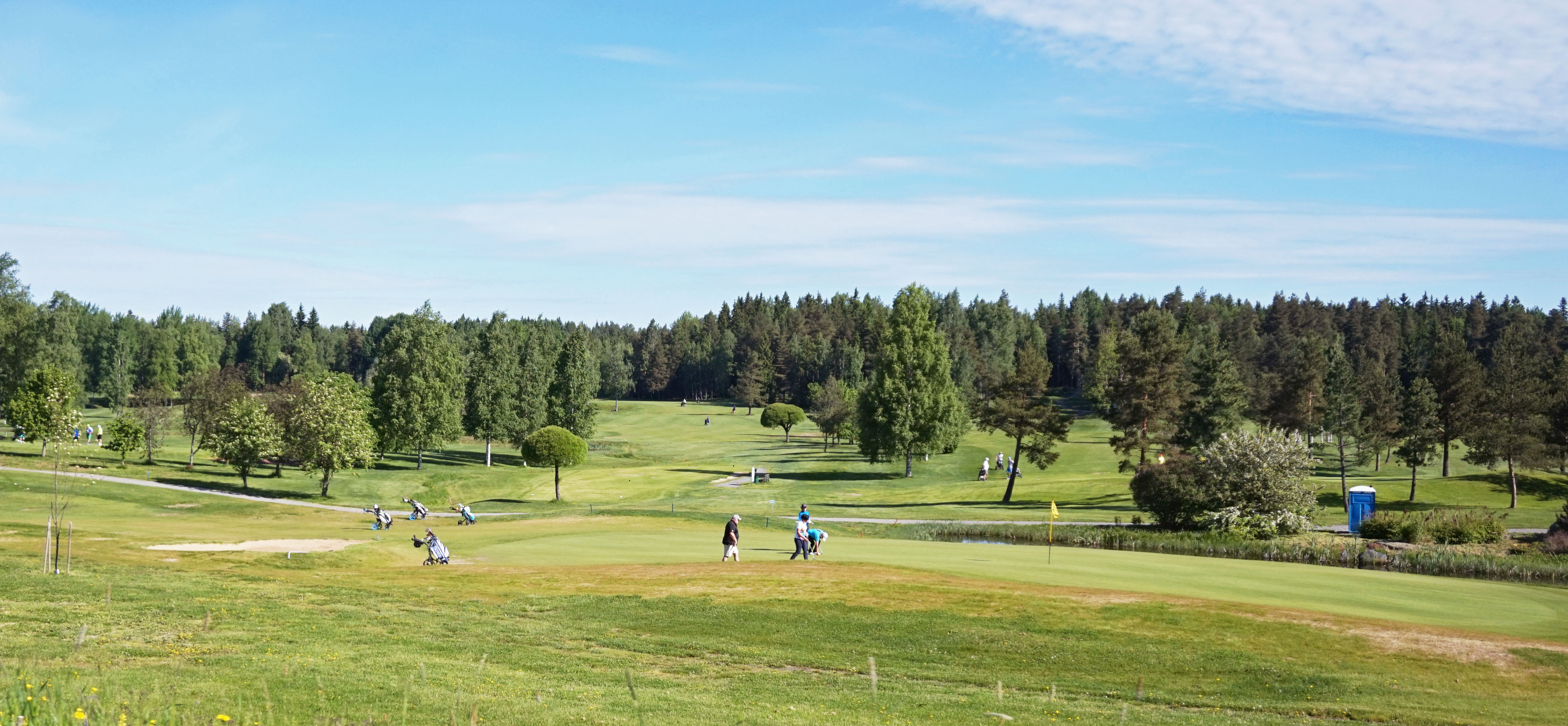
The Tammer Golf Course in the Ruotula district of Tampere, Finland

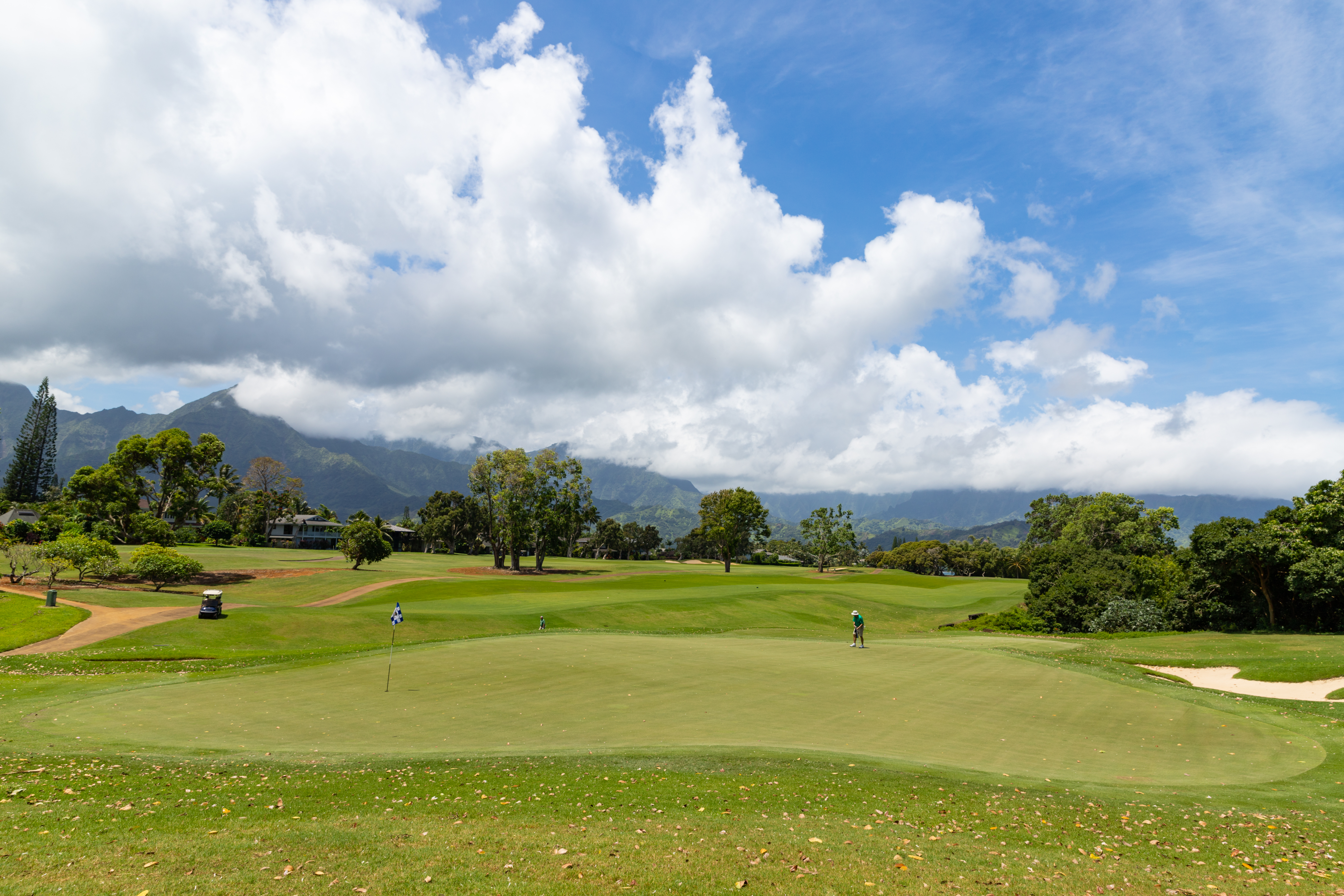
Golf course in Princeville, Kauai, Hawaii

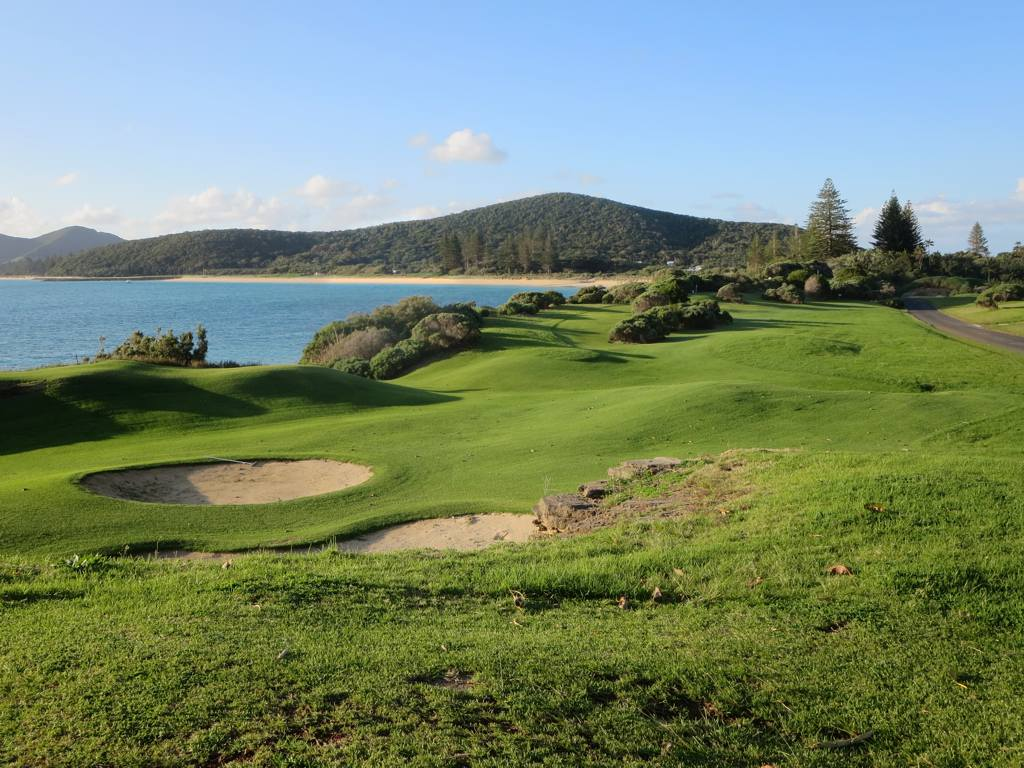
Fairway at Lord Howe Golf Course, Lord Howe Island, NSW, Australia

== See also ==
- List of golf course architects
