= Golf etiquette =

Set of rules and practices in golf

Golf etiquette refers to a set of rules and practices designed to make the game of golf safer and more enjoyable for golfers and to minimize possible damage to golf equipment and courses. Although many of these practices are not part of the formal rules of golf, golfers are customarily expected to observe them. The R&A rule book states that "[t]he overriding principle is that consideration should be shown to others on the course at all times."

== Care of the course ==
=== Divots ===
Divots should always be repaired, either by placing sand in the divot or replacing the grass. Some courses also place containers of divot repair mix on carts and at tees, which can be poured into the divot.

=== Pitch marks ===
A ball hitting the green often leaves an indentation, a pitch mark, where it strikes the ground. These need to be repaired to keep the green in good condition. After golfers have arrived at the green, they should make it a point to find their pitch marks and repair them to aid recovery of the turf.

=== Bunkers ===
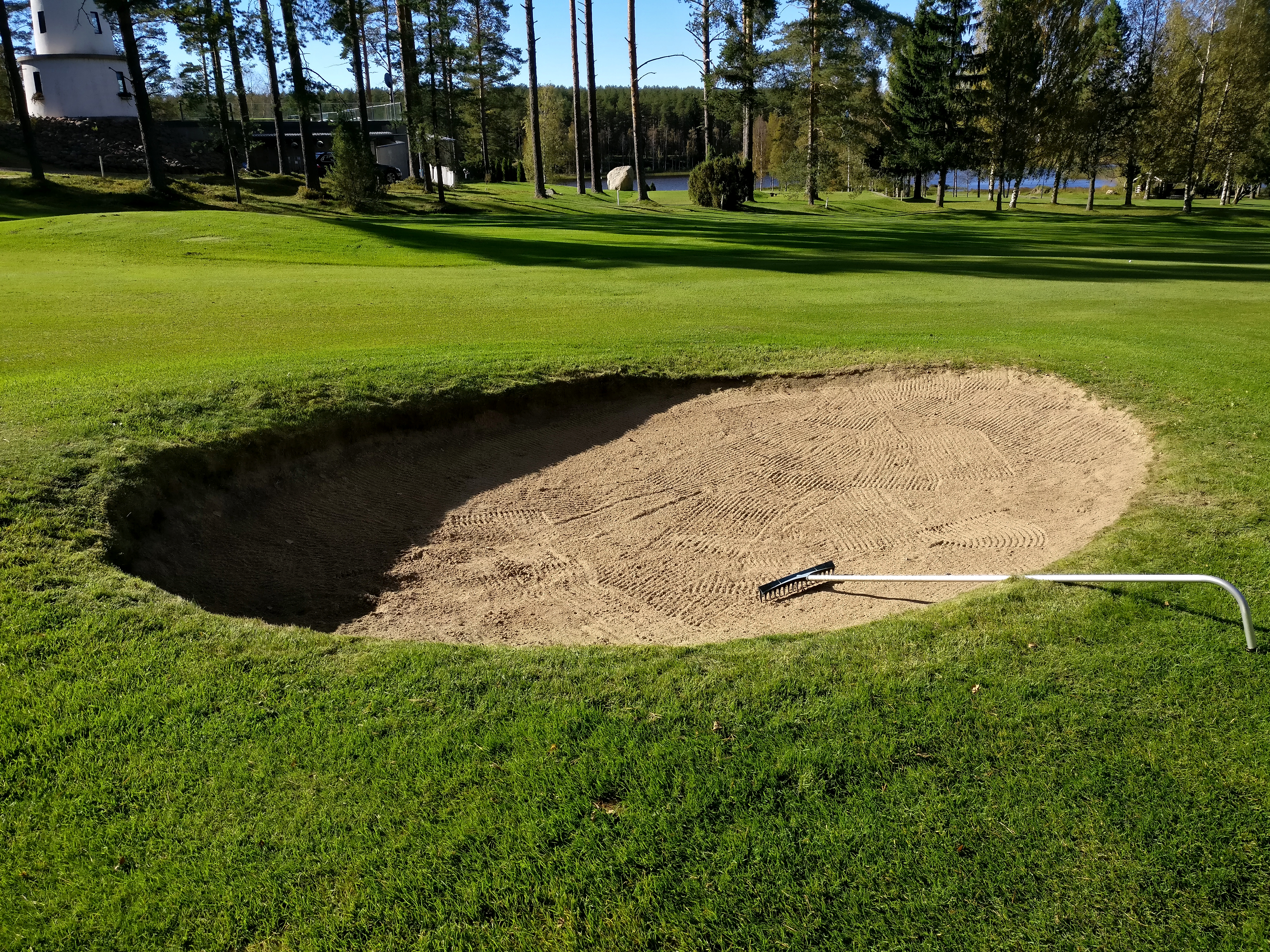
After a bunker shot a player should rake the sand smooth again

After playing from a bunker, a player should smooth the sand to even out any footprints and divots, usually by means of a rake. Not all sand-filled areas are classified as bunkers, e.g. coastal courses (e.g. Myrtle Beach) frequently feature designated waste areas; these areas need not be smoothed following play.

== Walking ==
Golfers should avoid distracting fellow golfers. Golfers should not run during play, but instead walk quickly but lightly during play and remain stationary while others play their shots. Players should be still and remain silent during a fellow player's pre-shot routine and subsequent shot.

== Golf carts and equipment ==
Golf carts should not be used to annoy or distract other players. The cart should be parked on the cart path when at the tee box or putting green. Carts should normally stay only on the paths, and are required to do so on many courses. Golfing equipment (bags, clubs and carts) should never be placed in front of the green as annoyance to the approaching players.

Should carts be permitted off the paths, golfers should observe the "90 degree rule": make a 90 degree turn off the path toward the fairway to a given ball, and return straight back to the path, not along the path of greatest convenience. Carts inflict wear and tear on the course, and can be accidentally driven over another player's ball. Golfers should keep the noise of backing up to a minimum and must always set the park brake before disembarking.

== Honour ==
Traditionally, the player with the best gross score on the previous hole, or the winner of the hole in match play, has the honour of teeing off first; if there is no outright winner of a hole, then the order of play does not change from the previous tee. In informal games one can play "ready golf" and not wait for the best score on the hole to tee up first. With the update to the rules in 2019, ready golf is now encouraged in all stroke play formats.

== Putting lines ==
Golfers should note each player's putting line, and avoid stepping on it as they play on the green or stand on a line of sight, that is, in the line of sight either ahead or behind a player who is attempting to putt. Players should not stand close to or directly behind the ball, or directly behind the hole, when a player is about to play. In the event that your ball is in another player's line, it is important to mark your ball's position, and only then remove it (pick it up) from the green. A golfer should also avoid stepping close to the hole.

== Slower players ==
Slower players should allow following faster players to play through if there is substantial room in front of them. Golfers should try to follow closely the group ahead of them, and not to be "pushed" by the group behind them.

== Tee boxes ==
A golfer should choose the correct tee box for their skill level, regardless of where the other members of the group are playing. Varying course lengths from different tees are one way to help even the playing field.

== Dress ==
Many golf clubs have dress rules, commonly requiring men to wear collared shirts and belts and explicitly banning jeans or denim.
