= Parsons Xtreme Golf =

Sports equipment company

- Type: Private
- Industry: Sports equipment
- Founded: 2014; 12 years ago
- Founder: Bob Parsons
- Headquarters: Scottsdale, Arizona, USA
- Area served: Worldwide
- Products: Golf clubs
- Website: pxg.com

Parsons Xtreme Golf (abbreviated PXG) is an American sports equipment manufacturing company that designs, markets, and sells a line of custom fitted golf equipment products and accessories, mainly clubs. The company is based in Scottsdale, Arizona and was established in 2014 by Bob Parsons, founder of web hosting service GoDaddy.

== History ==
Parsons Xtreme Golf was founded in 2014 by Bob Parsons, an American entrepreneur, billionaire, and philanthropist. He is an avid golfer who made his money in the technology industry and now invests in ventures that support his passions. Unsatisfied with many golf clubs on the market, he decided to launch his own golf equipment company. Parsons claims to have spent $350,000 annually searching for the right equipment. He stated that he decided to enter the golf club manufacturing business in an attempt to build a better golf club.

The company hired Mike Nicolette, a PGA Tour professional in the 1970s and '80s, who served as senior product designer for PING prior to joining PXG. PXG also hired Brad Schweigert, formerly PING's director of engineering, to assume the role of Chief Product Officer. Given no time or budget constraints, Schweigert and Nicolette worked on designing the first iteration of what would become the PXG 0311 forged iron.

According to Parsons, PXG's breakthrough came when its engineers identified the material to fill the hollow-bodied club head. A thermoplastic elastomer was injection molded into the club's hidden cavity adding cushioning to the club's thin face, improving performance and feel.

In January 2015, Ryan Moore announced that he would be using a set of PXG prototype irons and wedges in the PGA Tour that year.

Currently, the company offers a full line of equipment including drivers, woods, hybrids, wedges, irons, and putters. As of December 2016, the company had grown to seventy employees.

== Products ==
Parsons is a former United States Marine who served in Vietnam War. PXG's club numbering convention (0211, 0311, 0317, 0341, and 0811) is inspired by the United States military occupational code, as a tribute to the Marine Corps. PXG sells its products through its Scottsdale headquarters, club-fitters, golf and country clubs, and other international distributors.

== Sponsorships ==
PXG has maintained sponsorship deals with professional golfers who play on the PGA and LPGA tours. PXG's professional staff includes Jake Knapp, Christiaan Bezuidenhout, Zach Johnson, Eric Cole, Luke List, David Lipsky, Joel Dahmen and LPGA players Christina Kim, Lydia Ko and Céline Boutier.
