= John L. Saksun =

Canadian businessman (1922–2016)

John L. Saksun (May 3, 1922 – November 1, 2016) was a Canadian-Slovak tool and die maker and precision machinist. He was born in Žalobín, Czechoslovakia (now Slovakia). At age 16, shortly after the wartime occupation of Czechoslovakia in March 1938, Saksun left the country for Canada. He founded military and commercial aircraft manufacturer, The Queensway Machine Products Ltd, in 1952. He later founded golf club manufacturer, Accuform Golf in 1975.

== The Queensway Machine Products Ltd ==
Saksun incorporated The Queensway Machine Products Ltd in 1952 after gaining standing delivering on tank radar and de Havilland Mosquito bomber manufacturing contracts in World War II. The company has since played a central role in Canadian history through its manufacturing of the 1976 Montreal Olympic Torch, involvement with the Alouette 1, involvement with the Avro Arrow, and provisions made for the Canadian Armed Forces during wartime. Queensway Machine has primarily acted as a subcontractor for Boeing, Bell Helicopter, Fleet Canada, de Havilland and McDonnell Douglas over its 70-year operating history.

== Golf Industry ==
Saksun applied his manufacturing expertise to the golf world in the mid-1970s. He founded Accuform Golf in 1975, which designed and manufactured golf club heads. Saksun also invented the cylindrical-shaped bunker rakes found at most PGA Tour courses and around the world. At the company's peak, Davis Love III, Joey Sindelar, Gary Koch, Mike Donald, Dan Halldorson, Jerry Anderson, Jim Rutledge and Dick Zokol played Accuform clubs. The company was sold to former Labatt president Don MacDougall in the early 1990s. In 1990, Saksun was utilized by the United States Golf Association (USGA) to help solve a controversy regarding the use of square, or U-grooves, in PING's immensely popular PING Eye2 irons. The United States Golf Association argued that players who used the Eye2 had an unfair advantage in imparting spin on the ball, which helps to stop the ball on putting greens. Saksun set up methods of measuring the unique grooves and determined that PING was in compliance with the rulings. However, after proposing a cost-effective solution to help PING change the design of subsequent Eye2s, PING subsequently withdrew its US$100 million lawsuit against the United States Golf Association.

== Awards ==
- Saksun won the Canadian Professional Golf Association (CPGA) Pro-Am Championship in 1979.
- Saksun was one of one thousand nine hundred eighty-four Ontario residents who received the Ontario Bicentennial Medal in 1984.
- Saksun was granted Honorary Membership to the Canadian Golf Tour in 2006.
