= Karsten Golf Course =

Golf course in Tempe, Arizona

ASU Karsten Golf Course
- Location within Arizona
- 33.428°N 111.922°W

Club information
- Location: 1125 E. Rio Salado Parkway; Tempe, Arizona
- Established: 1989; 37 years ago
- Type: Public
- Owner: Arizona State University
- Tota holes: 18
- Website: asukarsten.com
- Designed by: Pete Dye
- Par: 70
- Length: 7,057 yards (6,453 m)
- Course rating: 73.8
- Slope rating: 131

ASU Karsten Golf Course was a classic designed links-style golf course in Tempe, Arizona, located on the campus of Arizona State University. Designed by noted course architect Pete Dye, it opened for play in September 1989 and was the home venue of the Sun Devils golf teams.

Karsten Golf Course closed on May 5, 2019, in order to be developed into sports fields. ASU moved their golf course to the nearby Papago Golf Course after striking a 30-year management agreement with the City of Phoenix, Papago's owner.

== Creation ==
Privately funded, the largest single contributor was Karsten Solheim (1911–2000), the founder of Phoenix-based PING golf clubs. The clubhouse and ASU players' facility were completed in November 1994. It was located at the northeast edge of campus, east of Sun Devil Stadium. The elevation of the course is approximately 1,150 feet (350 m) above sea level.

== History ==
The course was considered to many as the Home of Champions, referring to ASU's strong collegiate golf program's national titles; twice in men's (1990 and 1996) and seven times in women's (1990, 1993, 1994, 1995, 1997, 1998, 2009). Alumni among PGA and LPGA Tour professionals include Phil Mickelson, Jon Rahm, Billy Mayfair, Paul Casey, Howard Twitty, Tom Purtzer, Pat Perez, Matt Jones, Chez Reavie, JoAnne Carner, Heather Farr, Grace Park, Azahara Muñoz, Anna Nordqvist, and Carlota Ciganda.

Awarded a high 4½ rating by Golf Digest Rating Panel, a number of holes were considered the course’s signature hole. The short par-four 4th hole, the tough par-four 9th, the dauntingly long par-three 16th (248 yards (227 m) from the tips) or the ill humor par-four 18th, guarded by water down the left side, was considered one of the toughest finishing holes in the state. The course hosted tournaments, including the collegiate Men’s and Women’s Pac-10 and NCAA Championships, Phoenix Thunderbirds Collegiate Invitational, PING Invitational, and U.S. Open Qualifying.
