= Scottsdale National Golf Club =

Golf club in Scottsdale, Arizona

Coordinates: 33.7487766°N 111.815016°W

- Interactive map of Scottsdale National Golf Club

Club information
- Location: Scottsdale, Arizona
- Established: 2003
- Type: Private
- Tota holes: 45
- Website: sngc.com

Mine Shaft
- Designed by: Dick Bailey/Jay Morrish (2003)
- Par: 72
- Length: 7,579 yards (6,930 m)
- Course rating: 75.1
- Slope rating: 148

The Other Course
- Designed by: Jackson Kahn Design
- Par: 72
- Length: 7,165 yards (6,552 m)

The Bad Little Nine
- Designed by: Jackson Kahn Design
- Par: 27
- Length: 972 yards (889 m)

Scottsdale National Golf Club (SNGC) is a private golf club located north of the McDowell Mountain Range, and just east of Pinnacle Peak in Scottsdale, Arizona. It is owned by Bob Parsons, an American entrepreneur, who is the founder of GoDaddy and Parsons Xtreme Golf, and his wife, Renee, president of PXG Apparel. The property provides an uncontested 360-degree views and is protected on three sides by preservation wilderness.

== History ==
Until 2013, the course was known as The Golf Club of Scottsdale. It was renamed by Parsons after he acquired the golf course for $600,000. In 2014, he unveiled a $35 million plan to redevelop some of the course's holes and build a new clubhouse. Since that time, a second clubhouse and member villas have been constructed, and Parsons has invested about $250 million in the property.

Scottsdale National Golf Club now consists of two 18-hole courses and a nine-hole course. The original course, called Mine Shaft, is a par 72 spread across 290 acres (1.2 km2) designed by Jay Morrish and Dick Bailey. The second course, called The Other Course is a par-72 links course designed by Jackson Kahn Design. The 9-hole par-3 course is called The Bad Little Nine, also designed by Jackson Kahn Design. According to Today's Golfer, the 9-hole course is considered as one of the “trickiest” courses in the world. Parsons has kept an offer on the table to give a golfer $1,000 if he or she finishes under par when the flags are in their trickiest locations.

The club also has an extensive practice facility, which includes a driving range more than 400 yards deep, a short game area, and five different bunker and green scenarios.

In 2017, construction was completed on new contemporary villas for members, which feature local artwork, as well as a second clubhouse. Members can bring guests and stay on property to golf, dine, access the spa facilities and other amenities.

== Scorecards ==
Mine Shaft Course
Tee	Rating/Slope	1	2	3	4	5	6	7	8	9	Out	10	11	12	13	14	15	16	17	18	In	Total
1/2 Combo		579	178	456	480	641	186	362	491	471	3844	571	347	240	450	474	548	200	405	500	3735	7579
2/3 Combo		568	171	443	452	610	157	337	477	434	3619	549	336	211	408	449	513	157	382	466	3471	7090
3/4 Combo		551	164	389	398	567	152	318	365	412	3316	517	310	190	380	419	484	149	336	386	3171	6487
4/5 Combo		510	145	369	342	515	136	281	350	380	3028	468	288	170	358	400	454	137	281	375	2931	5959
5		478	119	312	291	486	117	244	309	349	2705	434	245	131	306	357	411	92	257	331	2564	5269
6		428	119	312	291	486	117	244	240	349	2586	434	245	131	261	225	344	92	248	280	2260	4846
Par		5	3	4	4	5	3	4	4	4	36	5	4	3	4	4	5	3	4	4	36	72
SI		1	15	9	3	7	17	13	5	11		2	16	12	10	4	8	18	14	6

The Other Course
Tee	Rating/Slope	1	2	3	4	5	6	7	8	9	Out	10	11	12	13	14	15	16	17	18	In	Total
1/2 Combo		400	567	239	575	519	189	419	568	163	3639	545	140	423	227	492	617	167	326	589	3526	7165
2/3 Combo		384	543	200	553	476	171	387	538	145	3397	535	134	396	215	472	601	158	299	570	3380	6777
3/4 Combo		359	512	178	520	433	154	365	508	134	3163	498	125	357	169	439	548	129	283	535	3083	6246
4		336	429	146	481	403	143	365	464	115	2882	460	117	324	157	418	528	113	234	510	2861	5723
5		290	413	133	424	281	129	281	425	96	2472	410	84	278	129	370	469	98	217	469	2524	4996
6		290	378	133	424	281	129	281	374	96	2386	341	84	251	129	294	469	98	217	391	2274	4660
Par		4	5	3	5	4	3	4	5	3	36	5	3	4	3	4	5	3	4	5	36	72
SI		11	3	15	9	7	13	5	1	7		6	18	14	16	8	2	12	10	4

== Tournaments ==
SNGC hosts the annual Wild West Invitational tournament. It's a three-day event for women and a four-day event for men with luxury food and drinks, and gifts for all of the players. The player's objective is to win their flight and proceed to the final round, called The Stampede. In The Stampede, competitors must contend with a number of distractions that could include mobile deejays with music blaring over loudspeakers, sounds of jackhammers and helicopters, and even Bob Parsons heckling players with a bullhorn.

== Golf Immersion Program ==
The Xperience is a three-days golf immersion program at SNGC that includes PXG club fittings for two people by a PXG master fitter. The day after the clubs are fitted, they are delivered to the participants for their playing rounds on all three golf courses. The Xperience also includes a tour of the club, accommodations and dinners.
