= Karsten Solheim =

Golf club designer and businessman

- Born: September 15, 1911; Bergen, Norway
- Died: February 16, 2000 (aged 88); Phoenix, Arizona, U.S.
- Resting place: Hansens Desert Hills Memorial Park, Scottsdale, Arizona
- Monuments: ASU Karsten Golf Course; Tempe, Arizona (1989); Karsten Creek Golf Course; Stillwater, Oklahoma (1994)
- Occupations: Engineer, inventor, executive
- Known for: PING golf clubs Solheim Cup
- Spouse: Louise Crozier Solheim (m. 1936–2000, his death)
- Children: 4

Karsten Solheim (September 15, 1911 – February 16, 2000) was a golf club designer and businessman. He founded Karsten Manufacturing, a golf club maker better known by the name of PING, and the Solheim Cup, the premier international team competition in women's golf.

== Early life ==
Born in Bergen, Norway, to Herman A. and Ragna Koppen Solheim, the family emigrated to the United States in 1913, and settled in Seattle, Washington, in its Ballard neighborhood. Herman was a shoemaker, and Karsten graduated from Ballard High School in 1931 and enrolled two years later at the University of Washington, with aims at becoming a mechanical engineer. Due to family financial hardship during the Great Depression, he withdrew from UW after his freshman year and then worked in the family shoe shop.

Upon the outbreak of World War II, he resumed his engineering studies via University of California Extension courses and joined the defense industry, working at Ryan Aeronautical in San Diego. After the war he initially worked as a salesman, but then returned to engineering with positions at Convair and General Electric.

== Golf ==
While living in upstate New York in 1954, Solheim took up golf at the age of 42 when his colleagues at G.E. invited him to make up a foursome. He quickly took to the game and found that his main problem was putting, so he designed himself a revolutionary putter. Using sugar cubes and popsicle sticks he came up with a design he would innovate and test. Instead of attaching the shaft at the heel of the blade, he attached it in the center. He applied scientific principles to golf club design, which had previously been based largely on trial and error, transferring much of the weight of the club head to the perimeter.

Solheim took to manufacturing golf clubs in his garage and after a move to Phoenix he touted them to skeptical professionals at tournaments. Acceptance came when Julius Boros won the PGA Tour's Phoenix Open, using Solheim's "Anser" putter in early 1967. Later that year, Solheim resigned from G.E. to establish Karsten Manufacturing, makers of the PING brand of clubs. In 1969, he introduced irons based on the same principle of perimeter weighting, and these were quickly successful. The other golf equipment manufacturers soon followed his innovations, which became industry standards.

With the success of PING, Solheim became a benefactor of golf. He donated millions of dollars to the Karsten Golf Course at Arizona State University and Karsten Creek Golf Course at Oklahoma State University, and sponsored LPGA tournaments in Oregon, Arizona, and Massachusetts. He was the driving force behind the creation of the Solheim Cup, the biennial tournament between teams of women professionals from Europe and the United States, which was modeled on the men's Ryder Cup, and was first played in 1990.

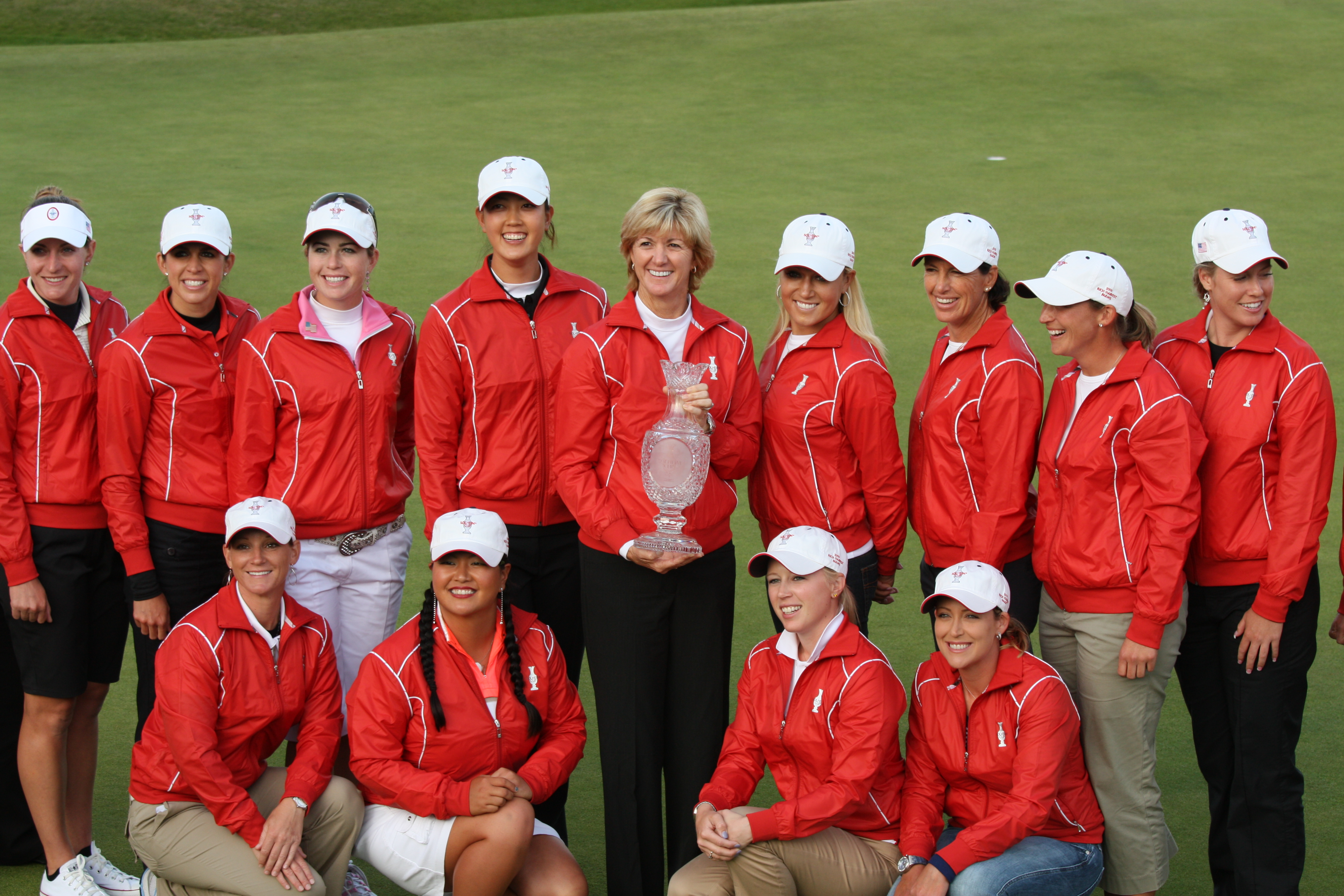
2009 Solheim Cup – Team of USA (2)

Solheim developed Parkinson's disease and in 1995 he handed over his company to his youngest son John. He died in Phoenix in February 2000 at the age of 88.

Solheim's contribution of perimeter weighting and usage of investment casting are recognized as two of the key innovations in the history of golf.

== Awards and honors ==
- For increasing trade with foreign companies through Ping, Solheim received an "E" award from President Reagan in 1988.
- Solheim was inducted in 1991 into the Scandinavian-American Hall of Fame.
- Two collegiate golf courses bear his name: ASU Karsten Golf Course in Tempe, Arizona, opened in 1989, and Karsten Creek Golf Course in Stillwater, Oklahoma, opened in 1994.
- Solheim was a ME Hall of Fame recipient from the University of Washington's mechanical engineering department. After his passing Solheim's wife Louise established an undergraduate scholarship fund and the Solheim Manufacturing Labs within the ME Department in memory of her late husband.
- Solheim was inducted into the World Golf Hall of Fame in 2001 in the category of Lifetime Achievement.
