= Mike Holder =

American college athletics administrator and golf coach

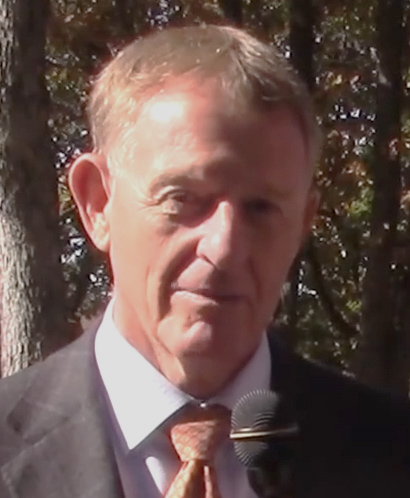
- Holder in 2015

Biographical details
- Born: August 17, 1948 (age 78); Odessa, Texas, U.S.

Playing career
- 1968–1971: Oklahoma State

Coaching career (HC unless noted)
- 1973–2005: Oklahoma State

Administrative career (AD unless noted)
- 2005–2021: Oklahoma State

Accomplishments and honors

Championships
- 8 NCAA Championships (1976, 1978, 1980, 1983, 1987, 1991, 1995, 2000)

James Michael Holder (born August 17, 1948) is an American former college athletics administrator and former golf coach. He retired as athletic director for Oklahoma State University on June 30, 2021 after having served in that position since succeeding Harry Birdwell on September 16, 2005. His previous position was head coach of the men's golf program, where he served for 32 years.

Holder was born in Odessa, Texas. He obtained a bachelor's degree in marketing from Oklahoma State while also playing under Labron Harris on the men's golf team. As a player, he won the individual Big Eight Conference championship in 1970 while leading his team to the team championship, and earned third-team All-American honors. After completing his MBA at OSU in 1973, he took over for his former coach. His teams won 25 conference championships and eight national championships.

Holder also was the main force behind the construction of the Karsten Creek Golf Course, designed by Tom Fazio, which was completed in 1994. It now serves as the home of the Oklahoma State men's and women's golf teams, and hosted the 2003 and 2018 NCAA championships. His main focus as athletic director after the completion of Karsten Creek was the construction of an "Athletic Village" that now houses most of the athletic facilities in one area of campus. Holder's tenure also saw the university open a new athletic training center, a new tennis complex, and most recently O'Brate Stadium, which opened in 2021 as the new home of Cowboys baseball.
