= Bob Parsons =

American Internet entrepreneur

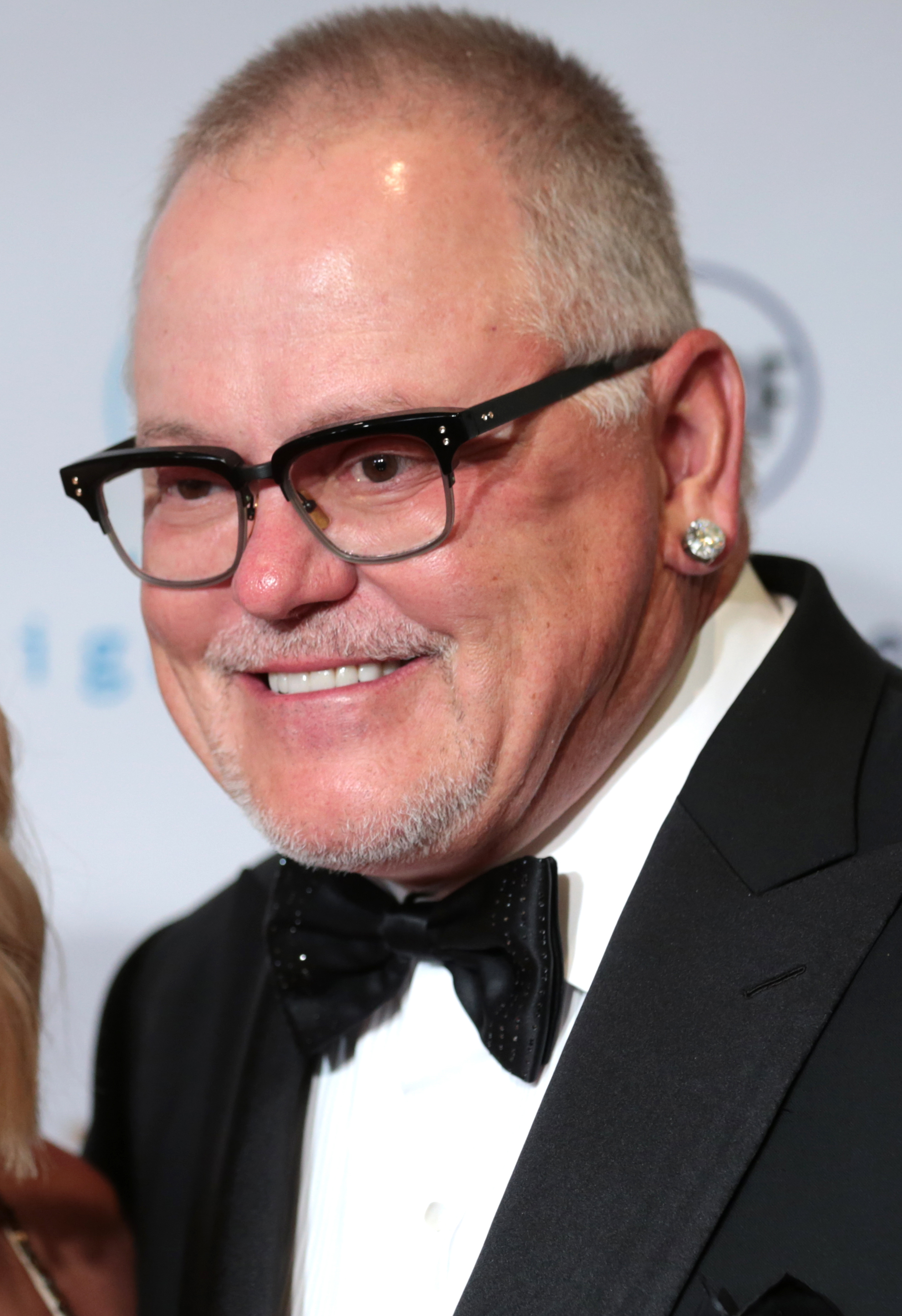
- Parsons in 2017
- Born: Robert Ralph Parsons; November 27, 1950 (age 75); Baltimore, Maryland, U.S.
- Education: University of Baltimore (BS)
- Occupation: Entrepreneur
- Title: Founder of GoDaddy.com; Founder of YAM Worldwide, Inc. Founder of The Bob & Renee Parsons Foundation; Founder of Parsons Xtreme Golf
- Spouse: Renee Parsons
- Military career
- Allegiance: United States
- Branch: United States Marine Corps
- Unit: 26th Marine Regiment
- Conflicts: Vietnam War
- Awards: Purple Heart, Combat Action Ribbon, Vietnam Gallantry Cross
- Website: www.bobparsons.com

Robert Ralph Parsons (born November 27, 1950) is an American entrepreneur and philanthropist. In 1997, he founded the GoDaddy group of companies, including Internet domain name registrar GoDaddy.com, reseller registrar Wild West Domains, and Blue Razor Domains. In July 2011, Parsons sold approximately 70 percent of GoDaddy to a private equity consortium and resigned his position as CEO. In June 2014, he stepped down from his position as Executive Chairman and served on the board until 2018.

Parsons is the founder and CEO of YAM Worldwide, Inc., which is home to his entrepreneurial ventures in the fields of power sports, golf, real estate, and marketing.

In 2012, Parsons and his wife Renee founded The Bob & Renee Parsons Foundation, which provides funding, primarily in the greater Phoenix area, to nonprofit organizations. In December 2013, they joined The Giving Pledge, an initiative started by Bill and Melinda Gates and Warren Buffett that requires signators to commit at least half of their fortunes to charity.

As of September 2023, Parsons is ranked No. 314 on the Forbes 400 list of The Richest People in America. His memoir Fire in the Hole was released May 7, 2024 by Simon & Schuster.

== Early life and education ==
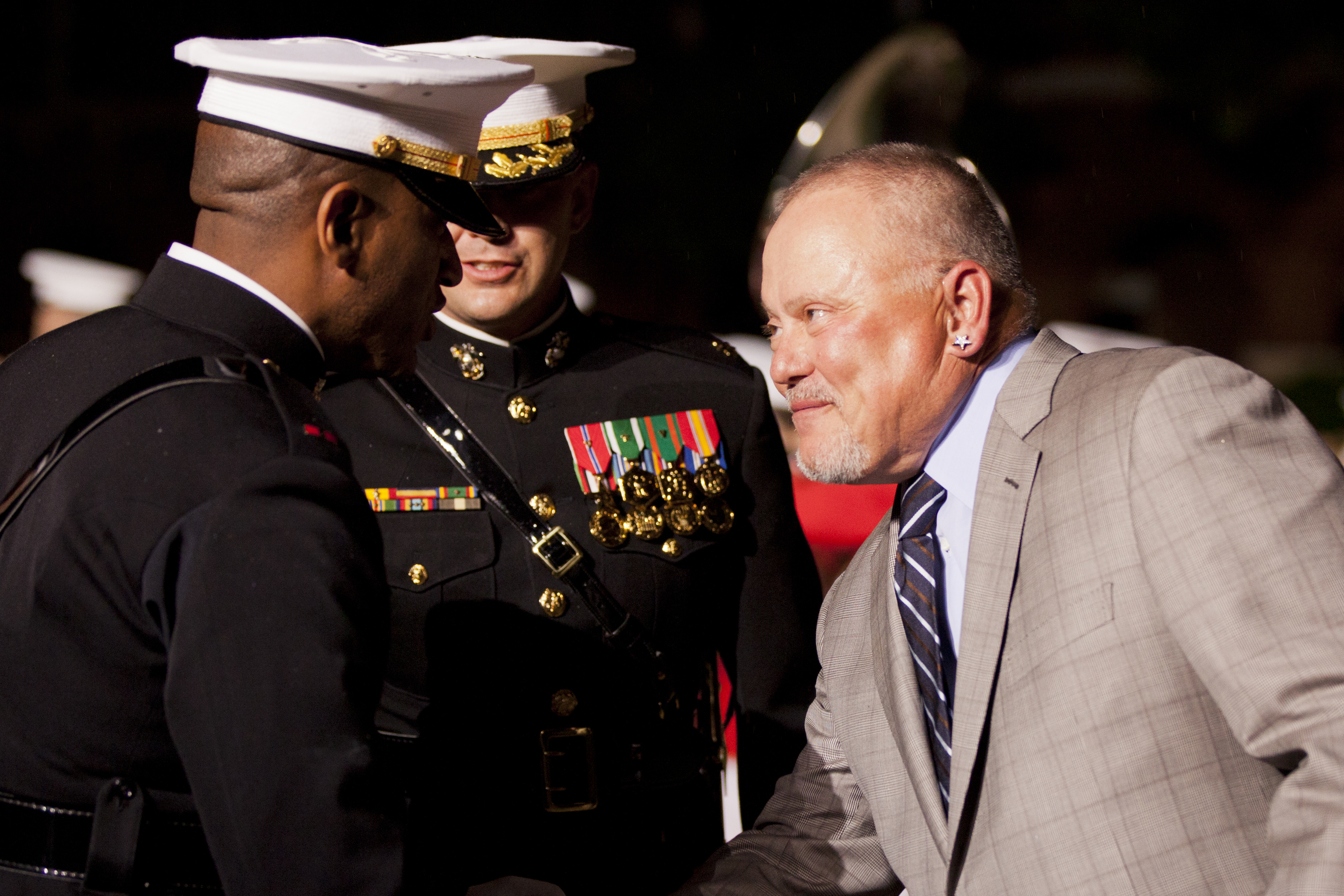
Evening Parade with Parsons as guest of honor in 2014

Parsons was born in Baltimore, Maryland. His mother was a homemaker, while his father worked as a furniture salesman for Montgomery Ward.

After nearly flunking out of high school, Parsons enlisted in the United States Marine Corps. He was assigned to the 26th Marine Regiment, which was attached to the 1st Marine Division. In 1969, he served as a rifleman in the Delta Company of the 1st Battalion, 26th Marines, during a tour of duty in Vietnam, in the Quảng Nam Province.

He was wounded in action and medically evacuated, then spent two months at a naval hospital recovering from his wounds. As a result of his service and injury, he earned the Combat Action Ribbon, the Vietnam Gallantry Cross, and the Purple Heart.

In 1975, Parsons earned an accounting degree from the University of Baltimore, graduating magna cum laude. He then began his career in the IT and software sales industry.

The University of Baltimore conferred an honorary Doctor of Humane Letters degree on May 21, 2008.

== Parsons Technology ==
In 1984, he founded Parsons Technology in Cedar Rapids, Iowa, and began selling MoneyCounts, a home accounting program. Eventually, Parsons Technology grew to be a 1,000-employee, privately held company. On September 27, 1994, Parsons completed the sale of Parsons Technology to Intuit, Inc. for $64 million.

== GoDaddy ==
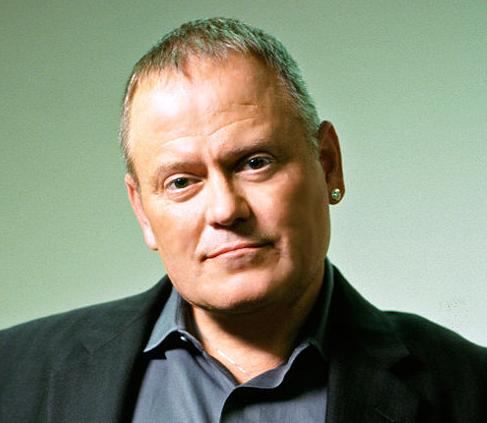
Parsons in 2008.

Parsons founded the Internet domain registrar and Web hosting company GoDaddy in 1997. In July 2011, Parsons sold approximately 70 percent of GoDaddy to a private equity consortium led by KKR & Co. L.P. and Silver Lake, and resigned his position as CEO. In June 2014, Parsons stepped down from his position as Executive Chairman. Parsons announced he would be fully stepping away from GoDaddy in October 2018, relinquishing his board seat.

== Property ==
He owns a property in the Kukio neighborhood on the Kona coast of Hawaii.

== YAM Worldwide, Inc. ==
In 2012, Parsons founded the Scottsdale, Arizona-based YAM Worldwide Inc.

YAM Capital is YAM Worldwide's private lending and investment arm, specializing in commercial real estate lending and acquisition of closely held middle-market companies.

In 2013, Parsons acquired Martz Agency, a 25-employee public relations firm in Scottsdale, Arizona. In 2015, Bob Parsons rebranded the firm to BIG YAM, The Parsons Agency, a full-service advertising agency in Scottsdale, Arizona.

In 2016, Parsons launched Sneaky Big Studios in Scottsdale at the YAM Worldwide Center where much of YAM Worldwide is based. Sneaky Big Studio provides production, post-production, and recording studio services including editorial, visual effects, color finishing, and audio.

In 2017, Parsons established The YAMWOOD Foundry, a business that creates custom, unique furniture, signs, and lighting fixtures for residential and commercial projects.

=== Motorcycle dealerships ===
YAM Worldwide subsidiaries LZ Delta, L.L.C. and MS LZ Delta, L.L.C. operate Harley-Davidson and multi-brand motorcycle dealerships in Arizona, Mississippi, and Tennessee. Parsons is also founder and CEO of Scottsdale-based Spooky Fast Customs, which creates customized motorcycle designs and fabrications.

In April 2014, Parsons announced plans to build the "world's largest Harley-Davidson dealership" in Scottsdale. Harley-Davidson of Scottsdale opened in 2015, the two-story, 150,000 square-foot dealership includes a lingerie boutique, tattoo and piercing parlor, arcade, movie theater, and wedding chapel.

=== Golf ===
In September 2013, Parsons purchased The Golf Club Scottsdale, a 292-acre members-only golf course, for $600,000 and undisclosed debt, and renamed it Scottsdale National Golf Club. In 2014, Parsons purchased undeveloped properties adjacent to his golf course including a 223-acre parcel for a reported $55 million, a 41-acre parcel for $5.4 million, and a smaller tract for $2.3 million. Also in 2014, Parsons announced plans to build a new clubhouse, nine-hole practice facility, and second 18-hole golf course on the property.

==== Parsons Xtreme Golf (PXG) ====
In January 2015, Parsons launched Parsons Xtreme Golf (PXG), a high-end golf club manufacturing company. The same month, professional golfer Ryan Moore used prototype PXG irons and wedges when he played in the Hyundai Tournament of Champions, a PGA Tour event.

=== Real estate holdings ===
Since 2012, YAM Properties has purchased more than 675,000 square feet of commercial real estate in Arizona's Valley of the Sun region. YAM properties include:

- Scottsdale Grayhawk Center, 147,084-square-foot retail plaza, acquired for $36.885 million
- Retail and office projects Citadelle Plaza and II Palazzo, acquired for $27.3 million
- Arrowhead Professional Center, a 71,066-square-foot office project, acquired for $13.25 million
- Retail space in two properties that total 66,983 square feet, acquired for $8.575 million
- McDowell Mountain Marketplace, an 84,087-square-foot retail center, acquired for $14.125 million
- Centerpoint on Mill, a 127,027-square-foot mixed-use development, acquired for $38.35 million
- Hayden Station, a 107,508-square-foot mixed-used development, acquired for $26.5 million
- The Cornerstone shopping center, acquired for $29 million
- Westgate Entertainment District, 533,000 square feet of retail, office and residential space; Located adjacent to Desert Diamond Arena, in Glendale, Arizona. It was acquired in June 2018 for $133 million
- Shops at Norterra, paid $108 million in cash for the open-air shopping and restaurant development at Interstate 17 and Happy Valley Road
- Pima Crossing - located on the northwest corner of Shea Boulevard and Pima Road.

== The Bob & Renee Parsons Foundation ==
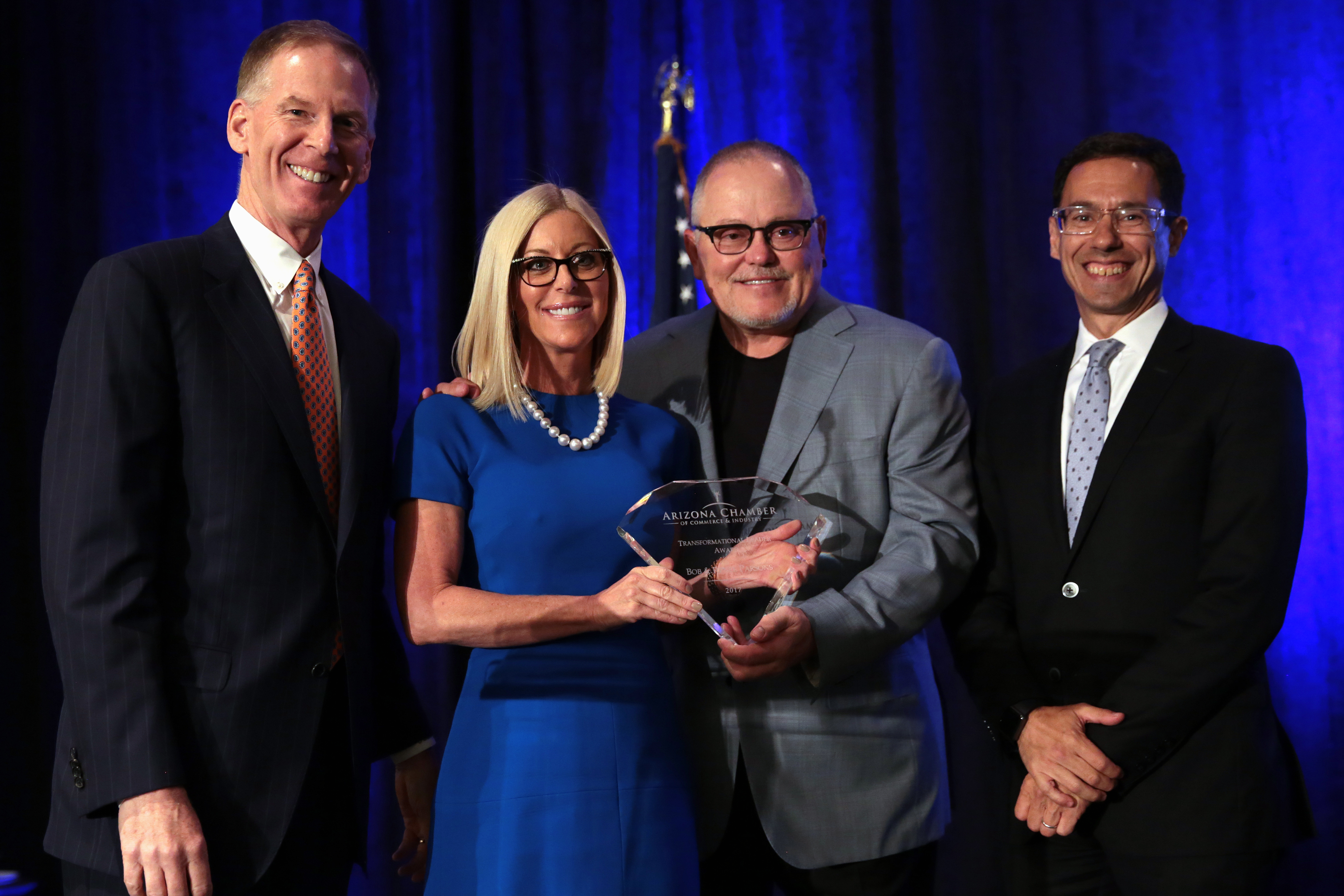
Bob and Renee Parsons receiving an award for their work with The Bob & Renee Parsons Foundation

In 2012, Bob and Renee Parsons established the Bob and Renee Parsons Foundation. Since then, the Foundation has awarded to more than 96 charities and organizations worldwide. A third of the total money awarded has been spent in local Arizona charities.

They joined Bill and Melinda Gates and Warren Buffett's The Giving Pledge in 2010 and agreed to donate half their wealth to charity. Since its inception, the foundation has donated over $10 million on a yearly basis, placing it among the state's 10 biggest givers.

The foundations main focus areas can be categorized in disaster relief, veterans, and the Phoenix community. After the 2010 Haiti earthquake, The foundation pledged $500 thousand for Hope for Haiti and a further $4 million towards relief efforts. The Bob and Renee Parsons Foundation has supported several veterans' organizations, mainly the Semper Fi Fund, with donations exceeding $8.5 million, mostly in the form of matching donations. In or around Phoenix, Arizona, it has donated more than $8 million to United Methodist Outreach Centers (UMOM) and its New Day Centers, which the organization spent in part to pay off the mortgage for one of its biggest facilities. It has also donated at least $10 million to the Southwest Center for HIV/AIDS, helping it open its new center. It is also donor to the Obama Foundation, having given more than $1 million to the foundation.

Other projects the foundation was involved with include the W. M. Keck Observatory in Hawaii, which amounted to three grants totaling $3.7 million to upgrade its laser system; the Girl Scouts through the Girl Scouts Beyond Bars program; $4 million in scholarship funds for theDream.us; a $1.5 million grant to the Phoenix Children's Hospital in support of one of its community outreach programs; $1 million towards the Barrow Neurological Institute at St. Joseph's Hospital and Medical Center; $1.4 million for the Murphy Kids Dental Clinic; and $2 million to Circle the City, in order for the organization to launch a new primary healthcare center.

== Political activities ==
Parsons is a registered Independent.

In 2012, Parsons donated $1 million to Restore Our Future, Mitt Romney's Super PAC.

On December 8, 2016, Parsons donated $1 million to the 58th Presidential Inaugural Committee.

== Controversies ==
In 2011, Parsons was criticized by animal rights and other groups for tweeting a video in which he shoots and kills an elephant on a safari in Zimbabwe. According to Convention on International Trade in Endangered Species of Wild Fauna and Flora elephants are listed as Schedule II. Parsons was unapologetic and believed the controversy would not harm his company.

GoDaddy was criticized as sexist for advertising practices between its first Super Bowl ad in 2005 through the company's IPO in 2014. He used his blog to draw attention to ads that were rejected from television as too racy.
