= Wood (golf) =

Type of golf club

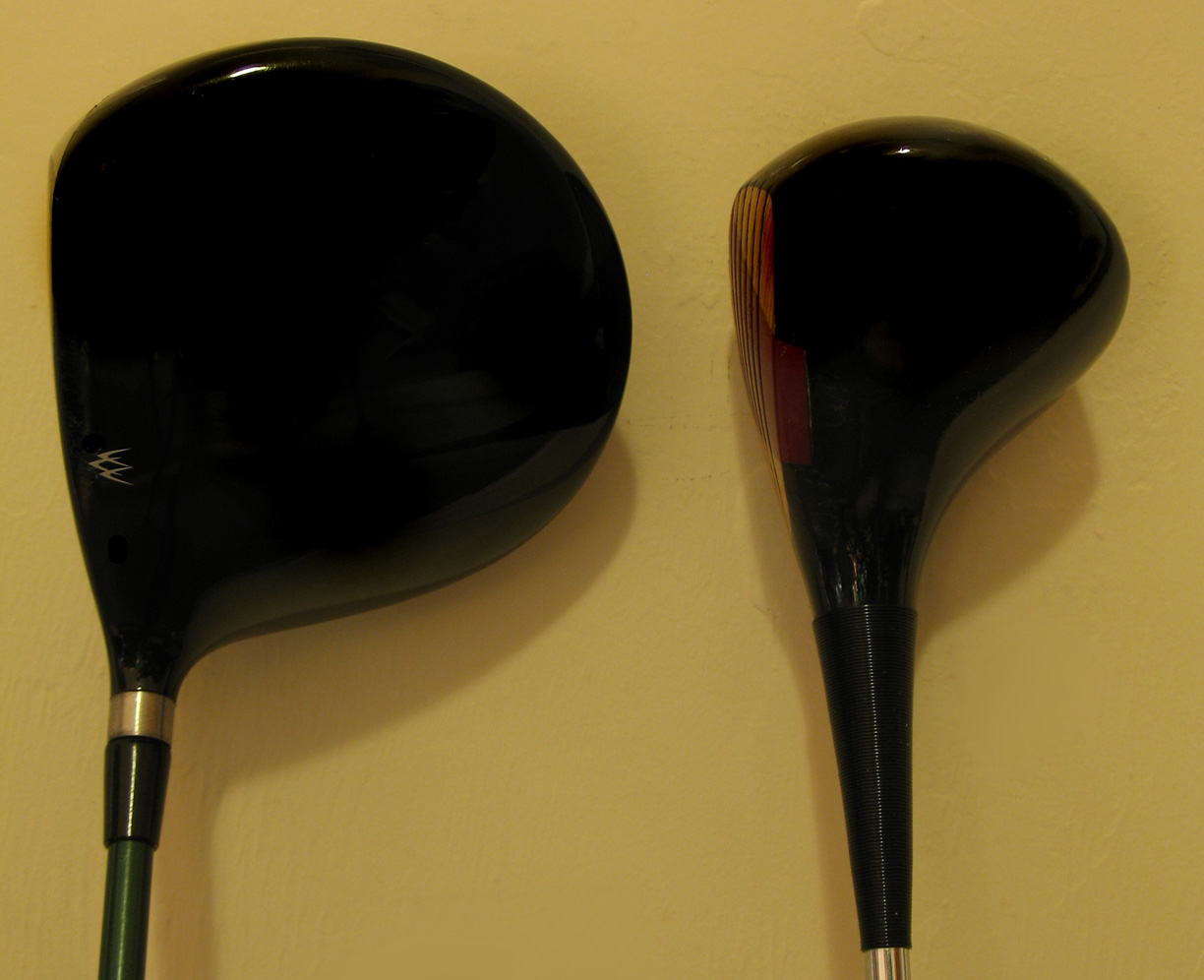
An Adams Golf Insight BUL 5000 460 cm^{3} 9.5° (left), an early 1980s Pinnacle Persimmon driver (right).

A wood is a type of club used in the sport of golf. Woods have longer shafts and larger, rounder heads than other club types, and are used to hit the ball longer distances than other types.

Woods are so called because, traditionally, they had a club head that was made from hardwood, generally persimmon, but modern clubs have heads made from metal, for example titanium, or composite materials, such as carbon fiber. Some golf enthusiasts refer to these as "metals" or "metal woods" but this change in terminology is not strictly necessary, because while the material has changed, the style and intended use has not. The change to stronger materials has allowed the design of the modern woods to incorporate significantly larger heads than in the past. Because of the increase in club head size, in 2004, the USGA created a new stipulation for the size of the club head. The legal maximum volume displacement of any clubhead (by the rules of golf) is 460 cm^{3} (28.1 cu in)

Woods are numbered in ascending order starting with the driver, or 1-wood, which has the lowest loft (usually between 9 and 13 degrees), and continuing with progressively higher lofts and numbers. Most modern woods are sold as individual clubs allowing the player to customize their club set, but matched sets of woods, especially as part of a complete club set, are readily available. Odd-numbered lofts are most common in players' bags, though 2- and 4-woods are available in many model lines. The number of the club is mainly a reference for the player to easily identify the clubs; the actual loft angle of a particular number varies between manufacturers, and there is often some overlap of lofts (one 3-wood might be higher-lofted than a 4-wood of a different brand or model). Other identifiers have been utilized such as "strong" and "plus" to differentiate various lofts within a line of clubs.

Woods generally fall into two classes, drivers and fairway woods, with a traditional set of clubs including a driver and one or two fairway woods (usually numbered 3 and 5). Many modern sets tend to include hybrid clubs, which combine some of the characteristics of a wood and an iron, to replace the 5-wood and low-lofted irons.

During the 2010s, golf club producers popularized the idea of woods and hybrids that can be adjusted by the player to provide different settings, such as loft and lie angle. This is done by unscrewing the club head from the shaft, adjusting the adapter located on the hosel to the desired configuration, and screwing the club head back on using a torque wrench.

== Drivers ==
The 1-wood, or driver, is the lowest-lofted, longest, and often lightest club in a player's bag, and is meant to launch the ball the longest distance of any club. Originally, the driver was only slightly larger than any other wood and was designed to be used from the tee or the fairway, but with the advent of hollow metal clubhead construction, the driver has become highly specialized for use off the tee by incorporating an oversized head and a deep striking face to maximize the "sweet spot" that gives the best results. It is possible to hit a modern driver off the fairway turf, but it requires a high degree of skill and a certain amount of luck regarding the lie of the ball. Certain 2-woods are available with a similar deep-faced design but a higher loft, which can be used in situations when a player needs slightly less distance than their average drive, or must make a driver-distance shot from the fairway or rough. However, 2-woods of any kind are uncommon, as a player in these situations will more often opt for the 3-wood, and save the space in the bag for a less specialised club like a wedge or hybrid.

The driver has become the most expensive single club of the modern clubset, largely due to the high emphasis placed on a player's drive distance; a longer drive gets the ball closer to the green in fewer strokes allowing for better chances of a birdie or eagle. While drivers are available cheaply, these are mainly marketed at junior players; drivers marketed to adult amateur players are an order of magnitude more expensive, with custom-made clubs for high-end players and touring professionals costing one or two additional orders of magnitude (in the case of prototype or preproduction clubs supplied by a sponsor club-maker). As a comparison, the upper end of the retail drivers is comparable to the price of an entire matched set of irons, and the next most expensive single clubs, the putter and the fairway woods.

=== Driver customization ===
With such high emphasis on drive distance and accuracy by players wanting to "play like the pros", a large amount of customization is available in drivers in order to provide the club configuration that best matches the player's specific swing mechanics. Club-makers generally provide for selection and/or customization of five things: the shaft flex, which determines how energy is stored and released during the player's swing; the loft angle, which is a determinant of launch angle and backspin; the offset, which determines the angle the clubface will have to the ball at impact; the clubhead mass, which can "fine-tune" the clubhead behaviour for a player's swing tempo; and the centre of mass, which is also a factor in launch angle and backspin.

These customizations are typically grouped in certain common configurations. A player with a correct swing of average strength (clubhead speeds about 85–100 mph at impact) will generally want a driver with a regular-flex shaft, 10.5° loft, a low offset (0–2°) towards a closed face (angled toward the player), and a low centre of gravity. This has generally been shown to provide the best overall distance and flight behaviour from an average swing, and drivers with this configuration are widely available. Drivers with a low closed offset or no offset are often called "game improvement" drivers or simply "regular" drivers. Ladies and seniors typically have slower swing speeds (60–85 mph), and so to maximise distance, it is important to increase "hang time" so that the lower horizontal velocity at launch can carry the ball farther. These players generally benefit from a more flexible shaft and a higher loft angle; this combination "times" the release of stored energy in the shaft to the slower swing, and the increased loft will launch the ball higher and increase backspin to improve flight time. The standard women's driver has a 13° loft and "Lady"-flex shaft, while senior men's drivers average 11° and have an "intermediate"- or "senior"-flex shaft.

Players with problems slicing their drive shots (for a right-hander, a slice starts straight and curves to the right) may benefit from an additional closed offset of 3–4°, which will help square the clubface to the ball during the swing. This is typically referred to as a "max game improvement" driver, sometimes as a "draw driver" because a player with a correct swing using such a driver will draw their shots (for a right-hander, a "draw" starts straight but curves left).

A player with a stronger-than-average swing (>100 mph at impact) will typically want a stiff-flex shaft and a lower loft, around 9.5°, which will respond better to the faster swing tempo and will launch the ball lower so the energy is spent sending the ball outward instead of keeping it in the air. The same player might also benefit from a "Tour driver", which has a 1–2° offset to "open" the clubface (angle it away from the player), and a higher, further-rearward centre of mass. These changes can correct certain problems with a strong swing, such as torquing in the clubhead "closing" it at impact causing draws, and the normally low and forward centre of gravity causing excessive backspin which can make drives "balloon"; the shot will start low but curve upwards in flight, then "stall" and drop onto the turf, reducing total distance. Most stiff driver shafts are marked usually X-Stiff or even more. These are commonly professional-level stiffnesses due to the rarity of amateur players capable of hitting swing speeds over 110 mph, although these also occur sometimes.

The furthest shooting drivers of all are long-drive-clubs, which may have a 48-inch shaft. This is the maximum legal shaft length in golf. Maximum length shafts are unpopular even in professional golf, due to the shot inconsistency and smaller error margin they provide.

== Fairway woods ==
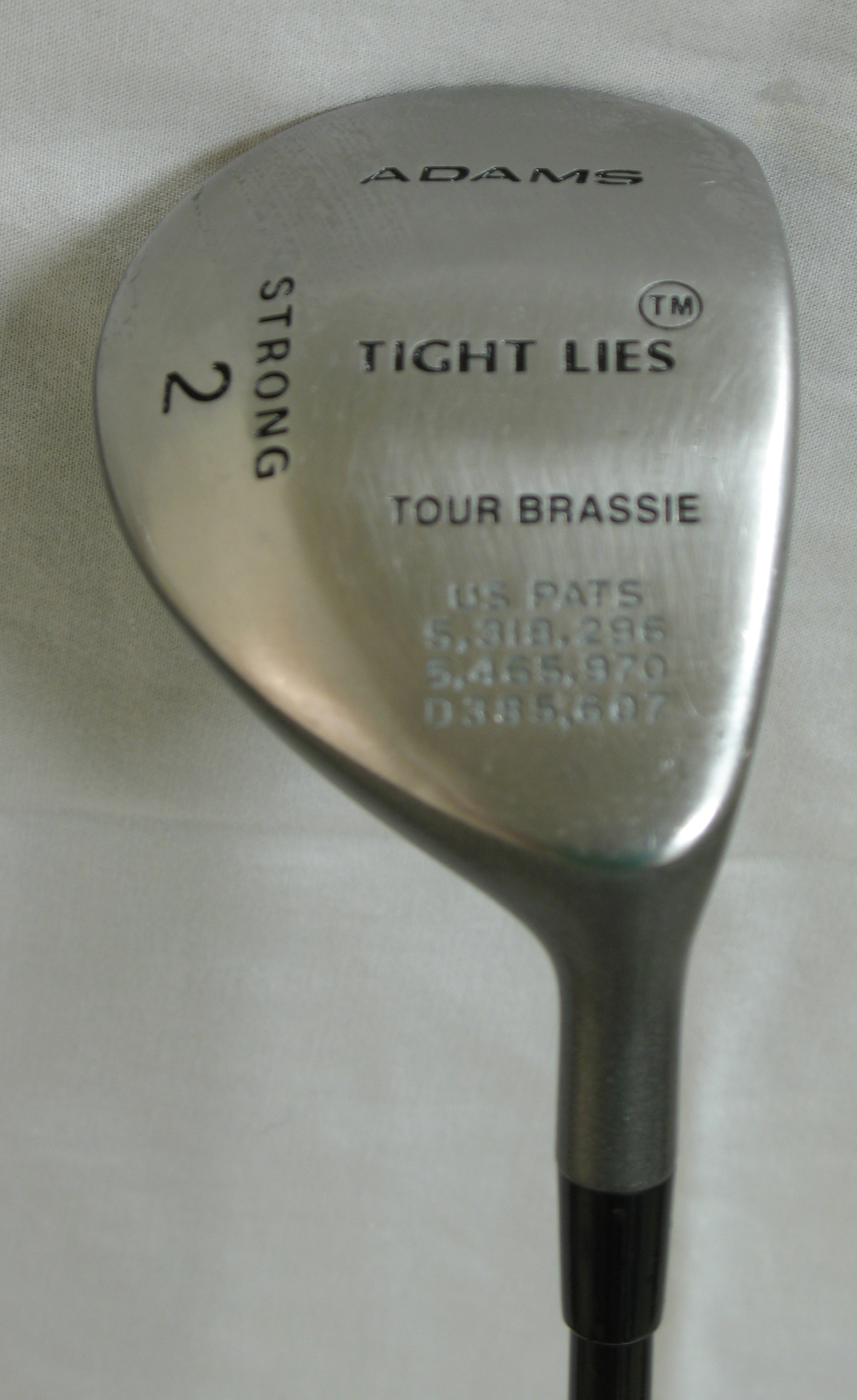
A Strong 2 Wood

Higher-number woods are generally known as fairway woods and, as their name suggests, are designed for shots from off the turf of the fairway that still require long distance, such as the second shot of a par-5 or a long par-4 hole. They have two important features: a higher loft to lift the ball out of the turf and over low obstacles like hills, and a shallower face height which allows a player to hit a ball from the ground using the exact center of the club, providing greater distance for such shots. These two design features enable players to hit fairway woods off the ground with greater ease than modern deep-faced drivers. Fairway woods are also useful off the tee depending on the hole; players may for instance wish to play their tee shot short (known as "laying up") due to a dogleg or a hazard in range of their driver, and will opt instead for their 3-wood. Fairway woods are typically made with a slightly shorter and stiffer shaft, a smaller clubhead and more loft than a driver or 2-wood.

While the most common modern clubset includes only one fairway wood, the 3-wood, woods are typically available from major brands in lofts up to a 9-wood. A 4-wood is sometimes seen instead of a 3-wood (to fine-tune range differences between a player's driver and fairway wood), while a 5-wood is a common addition to the 3-wood for players who prefer fairway woods to long irons for play through the green. 7-woods are rarer in men's clubs but more common in ladies' and seniors' sets, again as a substitute for lower-lofted irons which are difficult to hit well and whose low launch angle can be risky on a hilly or undulating fairway. Some custom clubmakers offer woods in lofts up to 55° (a "25-wood" equivalent to a sand wedge); these can be used to replace the entire standard set of irons with woods, for players who prefer the swing mechanics and behavior of woods to that of irons and wedges.

== Design ==
The head of a wood is roughly spherical in shape with a slightly bulging clubface and a generally flattened sole that slides over the ground without digging in during the swing. Traditional "wood" clubheads were made of wood, hence the name; beech wood or ash were common prior to the twentieth century, and later persimmon or maple became preferable. Modern club heads are usually hollow steel, titanium or composite materials, and are sometimes called "metalwoods" or more recently "fairway metals". Pinseeker Golf Corp. innovated the first stainless steel metalwood called the Bombshell in 1976. The design was somewhat untraditional and did not have the promotional success needed for profitable long term marketing - it was discontinued 3 years later. In 1979 Taylor Made produced a traditionally shaped stainless steel wood head called "Pittsburgh Persimmon" which achieved market acceptance by the mid-1980s. Oversized heads made from aluminum appeared in the mid-1980s but were slow to catch on since their introduction was via independent component manufacturers and not the larger endorsement based club manufacturers. Very large size drivers (300-500cc) arrived with titanium metallurgy which meant reasonable 'headweights' could be achieved with very large thin shelled but strong structures. By the mid-2000s, titanium heads could be made to 1000 cc (Golfsmith Inc made 1,000 cc (61.0 cu in) in the mid-2000s). Around this time the USGA decided to limit the size of driver heads to 460 cc (28.1 cu in) since the rule requiring heads to be of a traditional shape was being unduly stretched. However, during this period the club-making business needed some financial help, so the USGA relaxed the "traditional shape" rule while enforcing the new 460cc limit, and new head shapes appeared, such as "torpedo" and square/rectangular shapes, to attract the buying public to potentially game improving designs particularly regarding better mishit outcomes.

The typical loft for woods ranges from 7.5 to 31 degrees. Driver lofts generally center around 10.5° but the desired loft is very dependent upon the player's swing speed (low swing speeds need higher lofts); men's lofts vary between 8 and 11 degrees while women's drivers are between 10 and 13 degrees, and seniors' lofts trend toward the upper range by gender. The average 3-wood has a 13-16 degree loft (typically 15°) and the average 5-wood has an 18-21 degree loft. Higher lofts than that overlap with irons in distance, but many players prefer high-number woods to low-number irons wherever they can be used as the wood is easier to hit than a "long iron". The loft of any given club number varies between manufacturers, model lines, and the target player.

The shaft length in woods varies from about 40–48 inches (101.6–121.9 cm), with the current standard length for the driver being 45 in (114.3 cm), formerly 43.5 in (110.5 cm). Graphite shafts are usually preferred for woods due to their light weight, which enables users to generate higher clubhead speeds and thus greater distance. The maximum legal length of a shaft by USGA and R&A rules is 48 in (121.9 cm), though some woods used in long drive contests have been made with shaft lengths up to 50 in (127.0 cm) long.

The face of woods is slightly bulged to counteract the gear effect when the ball hits the face off center. The gear effect causes the ball to spin from hits that are away from the center of the face. The spin contributes a tendency for the ball to have a curved flight path away from the target. The slight bulge of the wood club face tends to counteract the gear effect by slightly changing the direction of the ball to make the flight path of the ball end up closer to the target.

== Construction ==
=== Shaft ===
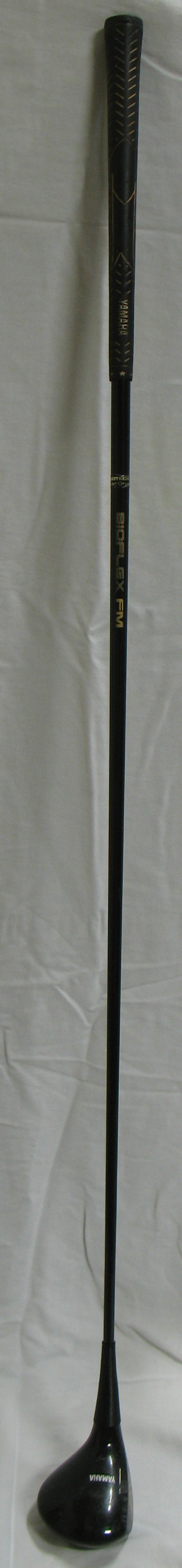
A rare solid carbon fibre driver, circa early 1990s

The shaft is the true engine of the wood. Widely overlooked, the proper shaft increases distance and accuracy, while a poor shaft can lead to inconsistent shots, slices, and reduced distance.

The oldest shafts for all golf clubs were made of Hickory wood. The shaft was whippy and light, but inconsistent in flex from club to club and quite fragile. Beginning in the 1920s, steel shafts started making an appearance, though the USGA and R&A did not allow their use in sanctioned tournaments until 1929. These shafts traded the lightness and flex of the wood shaft for vastly increased durability and consistency, and were the only type of shaft in general use on any club until the early 1990s. The modern "graphite" shaft (technically a carbon-fiber composite material) currently in use today combines advantages of the two older types of shafts; it is lighter and more flexible than either steel or Hickory, while having similar durability as steel, at the cost of slightly reduced shot consistency due to increased torque (though this has vastly improved on recent generations of shafts). Graphite shafts gained widespread popularity in the mid-1990s; although the carbon-fiber composite technology had been available since the early 1970s, it was very expensive to produce and nearly impossible to mass-market. Advances in producing, forming and curing composite materials have made carbon fiber much cheaper, and now virtually all new woods, regardless of price, have graphite shafts.

Shaft flex has a very pronounced effect on the power and accuracy of a wood. Every wood is somewhere in between the two extremes of flex, from the extra whippy, to the extra stiff. Whippy shafts are used by those who have low swing speeds and stiff by those who have faster swing speeds. The flex of a shaft allows it to store energy from a player's downswing, and release it as the head makes contact for increased club speed at impact. A shaft that is too stiff cannot be flexed by the golfer during their downswing, which reduces club speed at impact. A shaft that is too whippy will retain some of its stored flex at contact, wasting energy.

Shaft torque is also a concern. Flex and torque are generally related; the more a club can flex, the more it can also twist around its axis (though this is not always the case). A shaft that can torque easily is less forgiving of off-center shots as it will allow the head to twist, causing pulls and pushes. Low-torque shafts resist twisting for more forgiving behavior, but tend to be stiffer and require more power for proper distance. The latest generation of driver shafts combine a flexible shaft with a stiff tip, giving the golfer the required flex to "whip" into the ball while reducing clubhead twisting.

=== Head ===
Wooden heads predominated until the late 1980s. They had evolved to include a metal sole and a metal or plastic faceplate. These wooden headed clubs were dense and heavy, and were generally much smaller than today's clubheads. Their smaller surface area also made consistent contact more difficult, as the sweet spot of these clubs was considerably smaller than today's models.

Gary Adams, founder of TaylorMade Golf, is considered the father of the modern metal wood. Adams began to market his club in the late 1970s, but it was nearly a decade until metal woods became more popular with most golfers. Callaway Golf is also largely responsible for the current design of metal woods; the original Big Bertha driver introduced players to the "oversize" driver with a larger and deeper clubhead (at the time it was 190 cm^{3} (12 cu in) in volume), giving maximum club face and a deeper center of gravity. Callaway Golf continued to expand the size of the clubhead to increase these effects, resulting in the Bigger Bertha, the Great Big Bertha, and others in the line. The current incarnation of the Big Bertha driver is 460 cm^{3} (28 cu in), which is the maximum allowable clubhead volume according to USGA rules, though larger clubheads exist for long-drive contests and informal games.

Today, many metal wood clubfaces (and most driver clubfaces) are constructed out of titanium. Titanium has a higher strength to weight ratio than steel and has better corrosion resistance, so it is an ideal metal for golf club construction. Manufacturers can also make clubheads with greater volume, which increases the hitting area, and thinner faces, which reduces the weight.

=== Hosel ===
Traditional woods had a very thick hosel, often wrapped with thin cord, which provided a very secure joint between shaft and head at the cost of a higher center of gravity. Modern metalwoods have largely done away with the hosel altogether, instead anchoring the shaft within the clubhead. This allows as much mass as possible to be contained in the clubhead, lowering the center of gravity.
