= Žalobín =

- Municipality
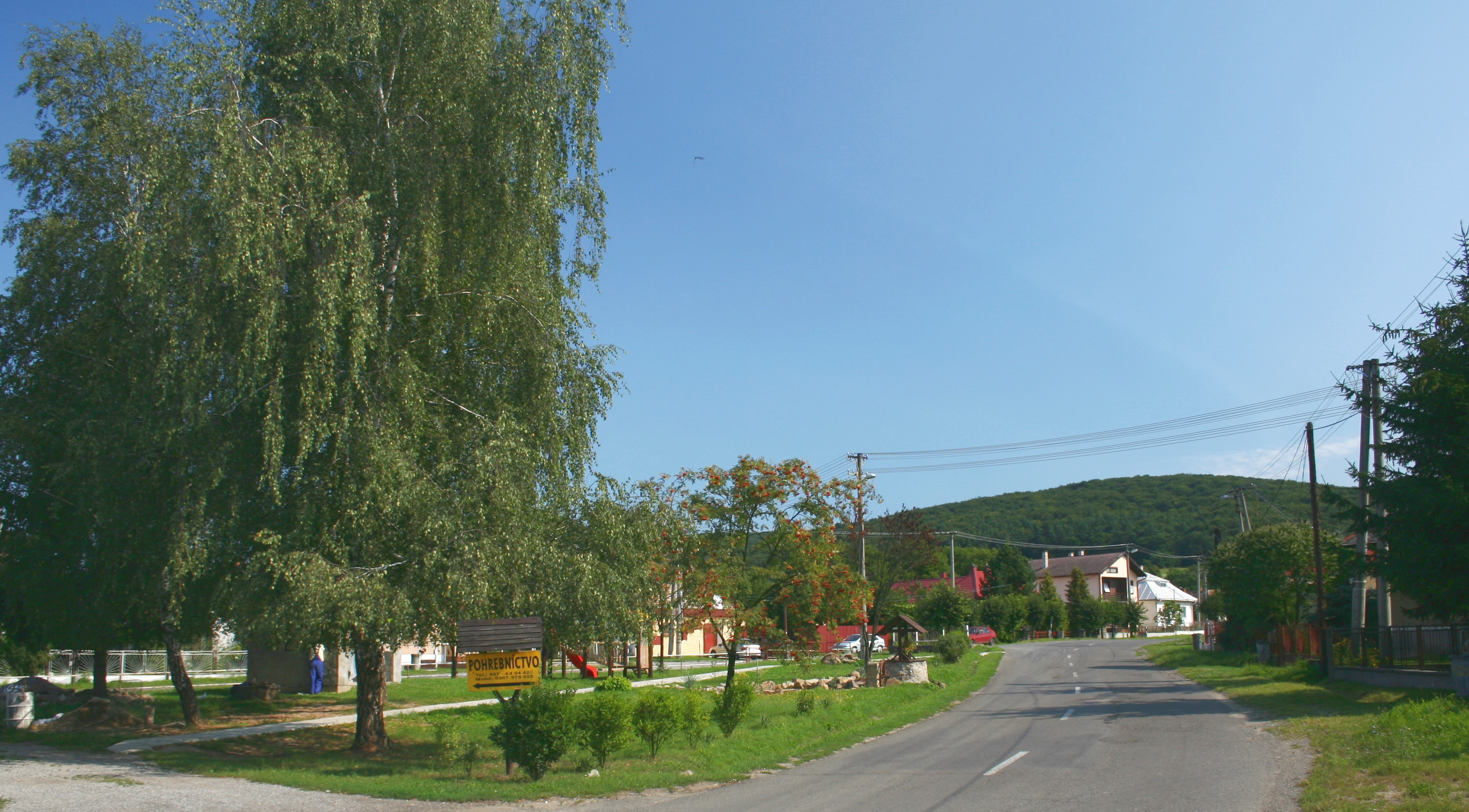

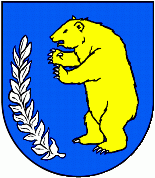
- Flag Coat of arms

- Location of Žalobín in the Prešov Region Location of Žalobín in Slovakia
- Coordinates: 48.97°N 21.73°E
- Country: Slovakia
- Region: Prešov Region
- District: Vranov nad Topľou District
- First mentioned: 1451

Area
  - Total: 11.87 km^{2} (4.58 sq mi)
- Elevation: 143 m (469 ft)

Population (2025)
  - Total: 808
- Time zone: UTC+1 (CET)
  - Summer (DST): UTC+2 (CEST)
- Postal code: 940 3
- Area code: +421 57
- Vehicle registration plate (until 2022): VT
- Website: www.zalobin.sk

Žalobín (Hungarian: Újszomotor) is a village and municipality in Vranov nad Topľou District in the Prešov Region of eastern Slovakia.

== History ==
In historical records the village was first mentioned in 1451.

== Geography ==
The municipality lies at an altitude of 143 metres (469 ft) and covers an area of 11.87 km^{2} (4.58 sq mi) (2025).

== Population ==
Population statistic (10 years)
Year	1995	2005	2015	2025
Count	693	769	845	808
Difference		+10.96%	+9.88%	−4.37%

Population statistic
Year	2024	2025
Count	815	808
Difference		−0.85%

It has a population of 808 people (31 December 2025).

=== Ethnicity ===
Census 2021 (1+ %)
Ethnicity	Number	Fraction
Slovak	802	97.92%
Romani	88	10.74%
Not found out	10	1.22%
Total	819	

In year 2021 was 819 people by ethnicity 802 as Slovak, 88 as Romani, 10 as Not found out, 4 as Rusyn, 4 as Polish, 2 as Hungarian, 1 as Czech, 1 as Italian and 1 as Other.

Note on population: The difference values of population numbers in the table "Population statistic" and in the sections "Ethnicity" & "Religion" is caused by the use of various statistical methods.

=== Religion ===
Census 2021 (1+ %)
Religion	Number	Fraction
Roman Catholic Church	739	90.23%
None	28	3.42%
Greek Catholic Church	27	3.3%
Evangelical Church	11	1.34%
Total	819	

In year 2021 was 819 people by religion 739 from Roman Catholic Church, 28 from None, 27 from Greek Catholic Church, 11 from Evangelical Church, 4 from Not found out, 3 from Other, 2 from Eastern Orthodox Church, 2 from Other and not ascertained christian church, 1 from Calvinist Church, 1 from Jehovah's Witnesses and 1 from Christian Congregations in Slovakia.
