= Hybrid (golf) =

Type of golf club

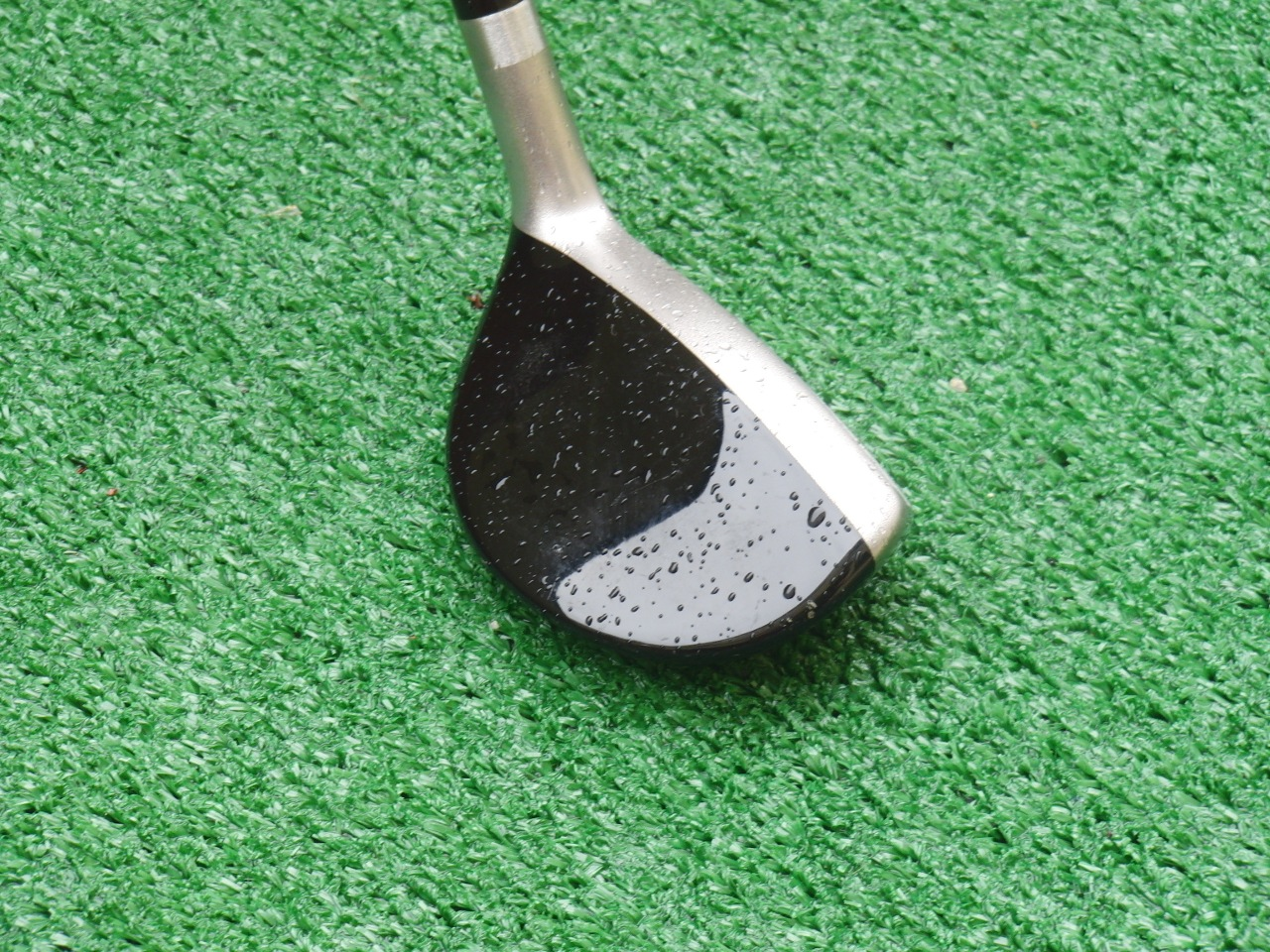

A hybrid is a type of club used in the sport of golf with a design borrowing from both irons and woods while differing from both. The name "hybrid" comes from genetics to denote a mixture of two different species with desirable characteristics of both, and the term here has been generalized, combining the familiar swing mechanics of an iron with the more forgiving nature and better distance of a wood.

For many players, long irons (numbers 1-4) are difficult to hit well even with modern clubfaces, due to the low trajectory and very small face of the low-loft clubhead. Players tend to avoid these clubs in favor of fairway woods which have a larger "sweet spot" to hit with, but such woods, having longer shafts, have a different swing mechanic that is sometimes difficult to master. The long shaft of a fairway wood also requires much room to swing, making it unsuitable for tighter lies such as "punching" out from underneath trees. In addition, the fairway wood clubface is designed to skim over instead of cutting into turf, which makes it undesirable for shots from the rough. The answer to this dilemma for many players is to replace the 1-4 irons with hybrids.

== Design ==
A hybrid generally features a head very similar to a fairway wood; hollow steel or titanium with a shallow, slightly convex face. A hybrid head is usually marginally shallower and does not extend backwards from the face as far as a comparable fairway wood. The head must have an iron-like lie angle, and therefore also has a flatter sole than a fairway wood. The face incorporates the "trampoline" effect common to most modern woods, in which the clubface deforms slightly, then returns to its previous shape, increasing the impulse applied to the ball at launch. The hybrid's lie, length and weight is comparable to an iron.

Being a new class of club, there is no generally accepted principle governing design. So while a "true" hybrid is as described above, many manufacturers cut production costs by marketing irons as hybrids by adding one or more features to make it look like a hybrid. Some have a club face that looks very similar to an iron, but instead of the cavity-back or muscle-back design these clubs have a slightly bulging back to appear more wood-like in shape. These "iron replacements" swing and perform almost exactly like irons, except the difference in the added weight which slows clubhead speed but increases force applied at a given club speed, allowing a swing to cut through turf or sand with more momentum remaining at contact. These clubs are preferred by players with slower swing speeds. Other club manufacturers produce "true" hybrids as previously described. The first equipment manufacturer to produce a full set of these true hybrids, in both left and right hand, was Thomas Golf. Hybrids are now also available in traditional (teardrop) and square head shapes.

Hybrid	D	1+	1	2	3	4	5	6	7	8	9	PW	GW	SW	LW
Loft (Note: Standard loft angles vary between models of club.)	10.5°	14°	16°	18°	21°	24°	27°	30°	33°	38°	42°	46°	50°	55°	60°
Lie (Note: Different golfers require lie angles that may be as much as ±3 degrees from the standard ones listed.)	56°	56°	57°	58.5°	60°	60.5°	61°	61.5°	62°	62°	63°	63°	64°	64°	64°
Bounce (Note: Varies significantly.)	0°	0°	0°	0°	0°	0°	0°	0°	0°	0°	0°	0°	0°	0°	0°
Length (in) (Note: Standard graphite lengths. Golfers may have different shaft lengths to suit their game.)	43.5	41	40.5	40	39.5	39	38.5	38	37.5	37	36.5	36	36	36	36
Length (cm)	110.5	104.2	102.9	101.6	100.3	99.1	97.8	96.5	95.3	94	92.7	91.4	91.4	91.4	91.4
Swing weight (D?)	0	0	0	0	0	0	0	0	0	0	0	0	0	0	0

== Behavior ==
Though generally similar to a wood of the same loft in performance, with slightly less carry distance (distance traveled before first impact) but similar launch trajectory, and generally similar to an iron in swing mechanics, hybrids have some behaviors different from either. Because the wood-like head design creates enormous impulse on the ball, the loft of a hybrid head is generally higher than either the wood or iron of the same number, so that the distance carried by the ball is similar to the comparable iron number.

This does two things; first, the angle of launch is increased so that the ball carries higher than the comparable iron. Second, the increased loft coupled with the tighter impulse also imparts increased backspin on the ball. This increased backspin is different from both the iron and the wood of the same number, and creates a flight path similar to a higher-loft iron but at a lower angle of launch; the backspinning ball will lift itself in the air along its flight line, "stall" when the lift generated by the spin coupled with the ball's momentum can no longer keep it in the air, and drop relatively sharply onto the turf. The sharp drop coupled with the continuing backspin creates "bite"; the ball's forward momentum will be arrested sharply at its point of impact and carry only a few yards thereafter.

Once this behavior is known to the player, it can be used to great effect. For instance, a player may be faced with a hole incorporating a hazard just in front of the green. A driver, low-loft fairway wood or long iron shot will roll significantly, and depending on the distance carried in the air the ball will either roll into the hazard with a resulting penalty, or roll past the green, which on many courses is difficult to recover from and may incorporate other hazards. Normally a player might hit a mid-iron shot designed to "lay up" in front of the hazard and then hit an "approach" shot with a wedge or short iron to carry over the hazard and onto the green. However, a hybrid with sufficient distance would allow the player to hit a shot that carries the full distance to the green in the air, but then "sticks" on the green relatively close to its impact point, allowing the player to make one stroke instead of two to get on the green.

== Use ==
A hybrid with a wood-like clubhead is often used for long shots from difficult rough and for nearly any shot where the golfer would normally use a long iron but feels uncomfortable doing so. They also are direct replacements for fairway woods in most situations, but a fairway wood will have greater club speed and more roll for better distance. Because hybrids can assist in getting the player out of tricky situations such as tight lies, TaylorMade Golf chose to market their hybrid clubs as Rescue clubs. The most common hybrid lofts are 3-iron and 4-iron equivalents (the 1- and 2-iron are usually omitted from the bag completely), though 5-iron equivalents are also seen in ladies' and seniors' sets. Hybrids generally replace rather than supplement long irons, but as a player is free to carry any set of 14 clubs that they wish, it is not unheard of for a player to carry both a 3-hybrid and a 3-iron, with the hybrid instead replacing the fairway wood; the higher-mass iron clubhead would be preferable to the hybrid for use in tall grass or soft lies.

Shots from deep within trees and in very high grass can still be difficult with a "wood-faced" hybrid, however, as the higher angle of flight can make "punching" out through low-hanging branches difficult, and the wider sole of the hybrid, similar to a wood, will still skim rather than cut into tall grass (similar to a wood but to a lesser degree). Here, the "iron replacement" form of hybrid is preferable as the trajectory and cut-through are similar to (sometimes even better than) a traditional long iron's while maintaining much of the power of a "wood-faced" hybrid.

When a ball is lying near the green, a player can use a hybrid to perform a short "bump and run". By assuming the player's typical putting stance and grip, a ball can be "bumped" in the air over the taller rough onto the green, where it will then "run" (roll) like a putt. Other clubs, especially mid- and high-lofted irons, can make a similar stroke and are more commonly used.

== Popularity ==
In 2007, the Darrell Survey Company reported that over 30% of consumer golfers were using at least one hybrid club, up from a little over 7% in 2004. They also found 65% of professional golfers on the PGA Tour, and 80% on the Champions Tour now use at least one hybrid club, with many carrying more than one in their bags.
