= Golf club =

Piece of sporting equipment used to hit a golf ball in a game of golf

A golf club is a club used to hit a golf ball in a game of golf. Each club is composed of a shaft with a grip and a club head. Woods are mainly used for long-distance fairway or tee shots; irons, the most versatile class, are used for a variety of shots; hybrids that combine design elements of woods and irons are becoming increasingly popular; putters are used mainly on the green to roll the ball into the hole. A set of clubs is limited by the rules of golf to a maximum of 14 golf clubs, and while there are traditional combinations sold at retail as matched sets, players are free to use any combination of legal clubs.

The most significant difference between clubs of the same type is loft, or the angle between the club's face and the vertical plane. It is loft that is the primary determinant of the ascending trajectory of the golf ball, with the tangential angle of the club head's swing arc at impact being a secondary and relatively minor consideration (though these small changes in swing angle can nevertheless have a significant influence on launch angle when using low-lofted clubs). The impact of the club compresses the ball, while grooves on the club face give the ball backspin. Together, the compression and backspin create lift. The majority of woods and irons are labeled with a number; higher numbers usually indicate shorter shafts and higher lofts, which give the ball a higher and shorter trajectory.

== Club types ==
=== Wood ===
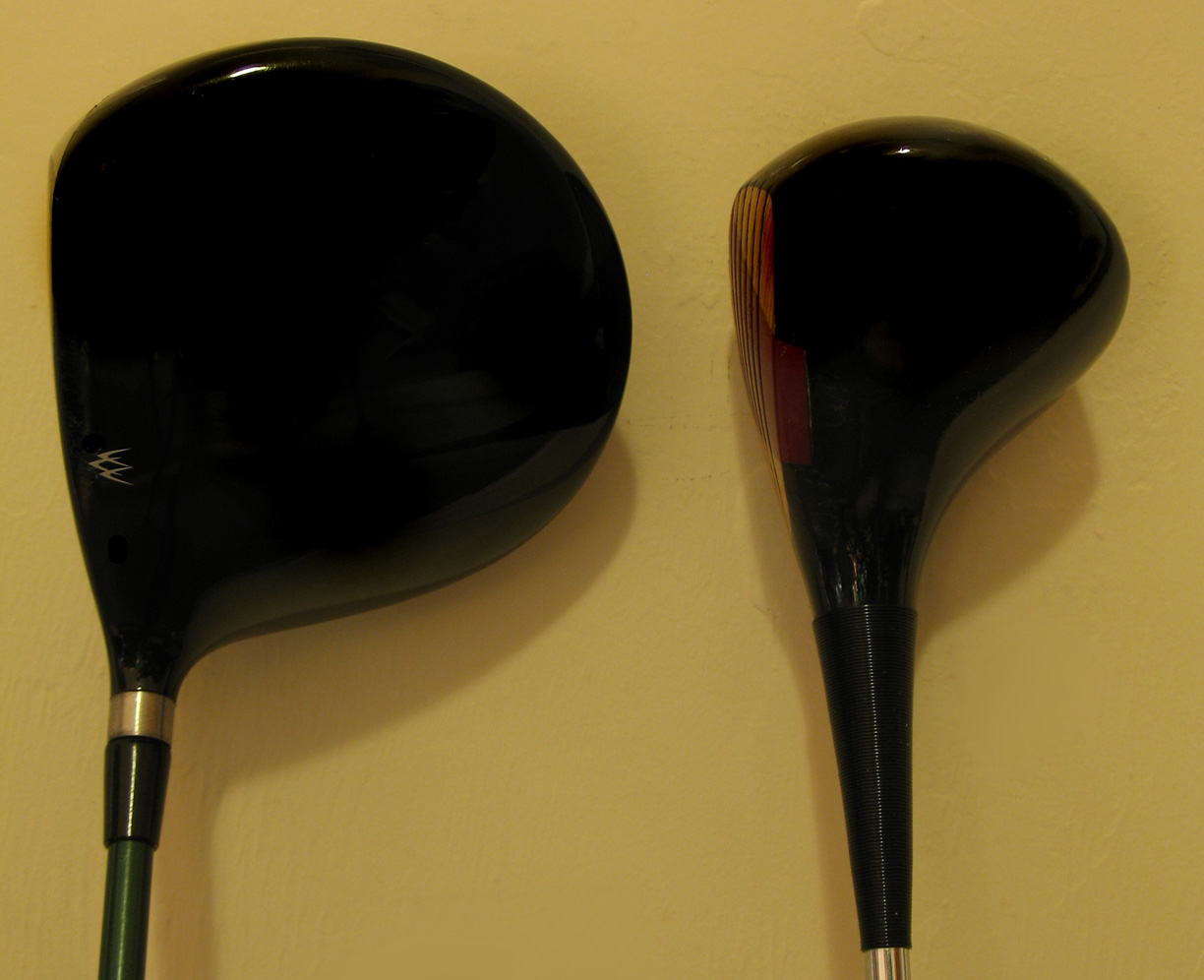
Golf woods

Woods are long-distance clubs, meant to drive the ball a great distance down the fairway towards the hole. They generally have a large head and a long shaft for maximum club speed. Historically, woods were made from persimmon wood, although some manufacturers—notably Ping—developed laminated woods.

In 1979, TaylorMade Golf introduced the first wood made of steel. Manufacturers later started using lighter materials such as carbon fiber, titanium, or scandium.

Most "woods" in golf are constructed from various metals; the term "woods" persists to characterize their general shape and intended use on the golf course. Contemporary woods commonly have a graphite shaft with a hollow head made of titanium, composite materials, or steel, emphasizing light weight to enable faster club-head speeds. A set of clubs usually has three or four woods, the longest and most powerful clubs. They are primarily utilized from the tee box and, on longer holes, may be employed for the second or even third shot.

Woods have been becoming longer, with a typical driver having a graphite shaft 45.5 inches (116 cm) long. Woods can have very large heads, up to 460 cm^{3} (28 cu in) in volume, the maximum allowed by the USGA in sanctioned events; drivers with even larger heads are available for long-drive competitions and informal games. The shafts range from senior to extra-stiff depending upon preference.

=== Iron ===
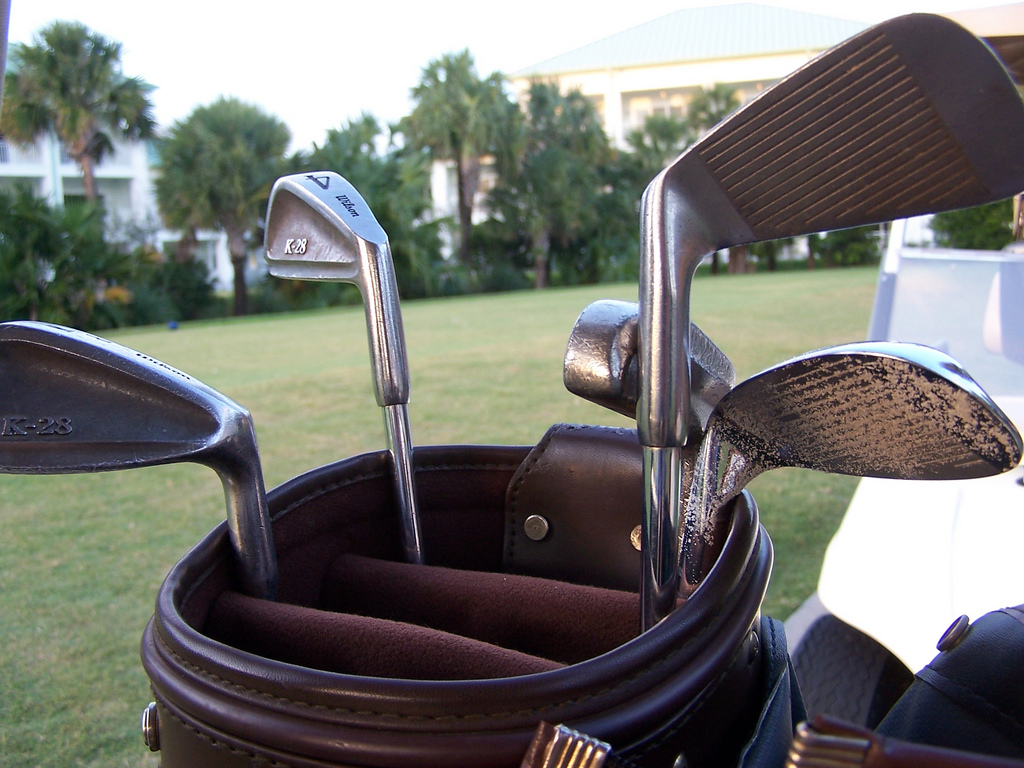
Golf irons

Irons are clubs with a solid, all-metal head featuring a flat angled face, and a shorter shaft and more upright lie angle than a wood, for ease of access. Irons are designed for a variety of shots from all over the course, from the tee box on short or dog-legged holes, to the fairway or rough on approach to the green, to tricky situations like punching through or lobbing over trees, getting out of hazards, or hitting from tight lies requiring a compact swing. Most of the irons have a number from 1 to 9 (the numbers in most common use are from 3 to 9), corresponding to their relative loft angle within a matched set. Irons are typically grouped according to their intended distance (which also roughly corresponds to their shaft length and thus their difficulty to hit the ball); in the numbered irons, there are long irons (2–4), medium irons (5–7), and short irons (8–9), with progressively higher loft angles, shorter shafts, and heavier club heads.

As with woods, "irons" get their name because they were originally made from forged iron. Modern irons are investment-cast out of steel alloys, which allows for better-engineered "cavity-back" designs that have lower centers of mass and higher moments of inertia, making the club easier to hit and giving better distance than older forged "muscle-back" designs. Forged irons with less perimeter weighting are still seen, especially in sets targeting low-handicap and scratch golfers, because this less forgiving design allows a skilled golfer to intentionally hit a curved shot (a "fade" or "draw"), to follow the contour of the fairway or "bend" a shot around an obstacle.

==== Wedge ====
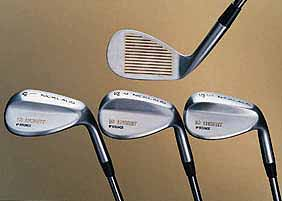
Golf wedges

Wedges are a subclass of irons with greater loft than the numbered irons (generally starting at 47°–48° of loft, above the 9-irons of 44°–45°), and other features such as high-mass club heads and wide soles that allow for easier use in tricky lies. Wedges are used for a variety of short-distance, high-altitude, high-accuracy "utility" shots, such as hitting the ball onto the green ("approach" shots), placing the ball accurately on the fairway for a better shot at the green ("lay-up" shots), or hitting the ball out of hazards or rough onto the green (chipping). There are five main types of wedges, with lofts ranging from 45° to 64°: pitching wedge (PW, 48–50°), gap wedge (GW, also "approach", "attack", "utility", or "dual" wedge, typically 52–54°), sand wedge (SW, 55–56°), lob wedge (LW, 58°–60°), and ultra lob wedge (sometimes called the "flop wedge" or FW, 64°–68°).

=== Hybrid ===
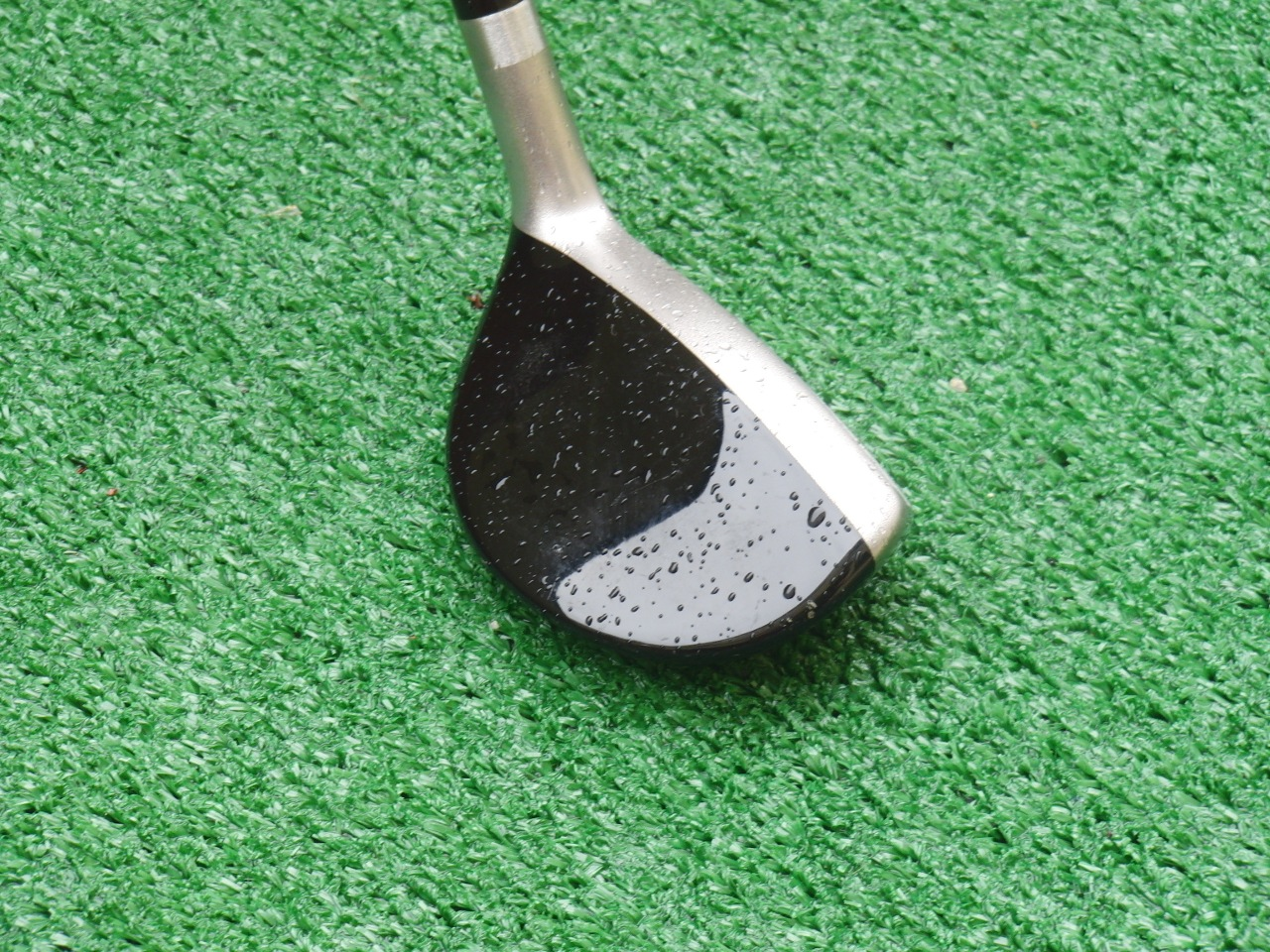
A golf hybrid

Hybrids are a cross between a wood and an iron, giving these clubs the wood's long distance and higher launch, with the iron's familiar swing. The club head of a hybrid has a wood-inspired, slightly convex face, and is typically hollow like modern metal woods to allow for high impulse on impact and faster swing speeds. The head is usually smaller than true woods, however, not extending as far back from the face, and the lie and shaft length are similar to an iron giving similar swing mechanics. These clubs generally replace low-numbered irons in a standard set (between 2 and 5, most commonly 3–4), which are typically the hardest clubs in a player's bag to hit well. By doing so they also generally make higher-lofted woods redundant as well. However, some manufacturers produce "iron replacement" sets that use hybrid designs to replace an entire set of traditional irons, from 3 to pitching wedge. Sets designed for less muscular players commonly feature a combination of high-lofted woods (up to 7-wood) and hybrids to replace the 5, 6 and 7-irons, allowing these players to achieve greater carry distances with slower swings.

=== Putter ===
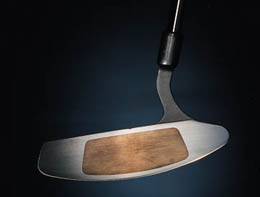
A golf putter

Putters are a special class of clubs with a loft not exceeding ten degrees, designed primarily to roll the ball along the grass, generally from a point on the putting green toward the hole. Contrary to popular belief, putters do have a loft (often 5° from truly perpendicular at impact) that helps to lift the ball from any indentation it has made. Newer putters also include grooves on the face to promote roll rather than a skid off the impact. This increases rolling distance and reduces bouncing over the turf. Putters are the only class of club allowed to have certain features, such as two striking faces, non-circular grip cross-sections, bent shafts or hosels, and appendages designed primarily to aid players' aim.

==== Chipper ====
The chipper is a club designed to feel like a putter but with a more lofted face, used with a putting motion to lift the ball out of the higher grass of the rough and fringe and drop it on the green, where it will then roll like a putt. This club replaces the use of a high-lofted iron to make the same shot, and allows the player to make the shot from a stance and with a motion nearly identical to a putt, which is more difficult with a lofted iron due to a difference in lie angle.

Most chippers have a loft greater than 10 degrees, which is the maximum loft permitted by the Rules of Golf for a club to be classed as a putter, so these clubs are actually classed as irons. To be legal for sanctioned play, a chipper cannot have any feature that is defined in the rules as allowable only on putters, e.g. two striking faces or a flat-topped "putter grip". This disqualifies many chipper designs, but there are some USGA-conforming chippers, and non-conforming designs can still be used for informal play.

== Construction ==
=== Overview ===
The shafts of the woods were made of different types of wood before being replaced by hickory in the middle of the 19th century. The varieties of woods included ash, purpleheart, orangewood, and blue mahoe.

Despite the strength of hickory, the long-nose club of the mid nineteenth century was still prone to breaking at the top of the back swing. The club heads were often made from woods including apple, pear, dogwood, and beech in the early times until persimmon became the main material. Golf clubs have been improved and the shafts are now made of steel, titanium, other types of metals or carbon fiber. The shaft is a tapered steel tube or a series of stepped steel tubes in telescopic fashion. This has improved the accuracy of golfers. The grips of the clubs are made from leather or rubber.

=== Shaft ===
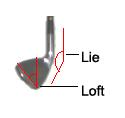
Loft and lie of a golf club

The shaft is a tapered tube made of metal (usually steel) or carbon fiber composite (referred to as graphite). The shaft is roughly 0.5 inches (13 mm) in diameter near the grip and from 34 to 48 inches (86 to 122 cm) in length. Shafts weigh from 45 to 150 grams (1.6 to 5.3 oz), depending on the material and length.

Shafts are quantified in a number of different ways. The most common is the shaft flex. Simply, the shaft flex is the amount that the shaft will bend when placed under a load. A stiffer shaft will not flex as much, which requires more power to flex and "whip" through the ball properly (which results in higher club speed at impact for more distance), while a more flexible shaft will whip with less power required for better distance on slower swings, but may torque and over-flex if swung with too much power causing the head not to be square at impact, resulting in lower accuracy. Most shaft makers offer a variety of flexes. The most common are: L/W (Lady/Women's), A/I (Soft Regular, Intermediate or Senior), R (Regular), S (Stiff), and X (Tour Stiff, Extra Stiff or Strong). A regular flex shaft is generally appropriate for those with an average head speed (80–94 mph (129–151 km/h)), while an A-Flex (or senior shaft) is for players with a slower swing speed (70–79 mph (113–127 km/h)), and the stiffer shafts, such as S-Flex and X-Flex (Stiff and Extra-Stiff shafts) are reserved only for those players with an above average swinging speed, usually above 100 mph (160 km/h). Some companies also offer a "stiff-regular" or "firm" flex for players whose club speed falls in the upper range of a Regular shaft (90–100 mph (140–160 km/h)), allowing golfers and club makers to fine-tune the flex for a stronger amateur-level player.

At impact, the club head can twist as a result of torque applied to the shaft, reducing accuracy as the face of the club is not square to the player's stance. The ability of a shaft to twist along its length due to this torque is fundamentally a function of the flex of the shaft itself; a stiffer shaft will also torque less. To counter torque in more flexible shafts, club makers design the shafts with varying degrees of torque through their length, particularly along the thinnest part of the shaft where it joins with the club head. This results in a point at which the shaft is most flexible, called the "kick point"; above that point the increasing diameter of the shaft makes it more rigid, while below that point the shaft is reinforced internally to reduce torquing of the club head. Shafts have typically been classified as having a low, medium or high kick; a low kick means the shaft will store energy closer to the club head, which means the club head can twist more but also allows for higher club head speeds. A high kick shaft will store energy closer to the grip; such a shaft will feel firmer when swinging it and will give better control over direction, but the same strength swing will flex the shaft less, which will reduce club-head speed.

Widely overlooked as a part of the club, the shaft is considered by many to be the engine of the modern club head. Shafts range in price from a mere US$4 to over US$1200. Current graphite shafts weigh considerably less than their steel counterparts (sometimes weighing less than 50 grams (1.8 oz) for a driver shaft), allowing for lighter clubs that can be swung at greater speed. Beginning in the late 1990s, custom shafts have been integrated into the club-making process. These shafts will, within a given flex rating, address specific criteria, such as to launch the ball higher or lower or to adjust for the timing of a player's swing to load and unload the shaft at the correct moments of the swing for maximum power. Whereas in the past each club could come with only one shaft, today's club heads can be fitted with dozens of different shafts, each with slight variation in behavior, creating the potential for a much better fit for the average golfer.

=== Grip ===
The grip of the club is attached to the opposite end of the shaft from the club head, and is the part of the club the player holds on to while swinging. Originally, the grip was composed of one or more leather strips wrapped around the shaft. The leather outer wrap on a grip is still seen on some clubs, most commonly putters, but most modern grips are a one-piece "sleeve" made of rubber, synthetic or composite material that is slid over the shaft and secured with an adhesive. These sleeve grips allow club makers and golfers to customize the grip's diameter, consistency (softness/firmness) and texturing pattern to best fit the player. Clubs with an outer "wrap" of leather or leather-like synthetic still typically have a "sleeve" form underneath to add diameter to the grip and give it its basic profile.

==== Grip rules ====
According to the rules of golf, all club grips must have the same cross-section shape along their entire length (the diameter can vary), and with the exception of the putter, must have a circular cross-section. The putter may have any cross section that is symmetrical along the length of the grip through at least one plane; "shield" profiles with a flat top and curved underside are common. Grips may taper from thick to thin along their length (and virtually all do), but they are not allowed to have any waisting (a thinner section of the grip surrounded by thicker sections above and below it) or bulges (thicker sections of the grip surrounded by thinner sections). Minor variations in surface texture (such as the natural variation of a "wrap"-style grip) are not counted unless significant.

==== Re-gripping ====
Advances in materials have resulted in more durable, longer-lasting soft grips, but nevertheless grips do eventually dry out, harden, or are otherwise damaged and must be replaced. Replacement grips sold as do-it-yourself kits are generally inexpensive and of high quality, although custom grips that are larger, softer, or textured differently from the everyday "wrap"-style grip are generally bought and installed by a clubsmith.

Re-gripping used to require toxic, flammable solvents to soften and activate the adhesive, and a vise to hold the club steady while the grip was forced on. The newest replacement kits, however, use double-sided tape with a water-activated adhesive that is slippery when first activated, allowing easier installation. Once the adhesive cures, it creates a very strong bond between grip and shaft and the grip is usually impossible to remove without cutting it off.

=== Hosel ===
The hosel is the portion of the club head to which the shaft attaches. Hosel design is integral to the balance, feel and power of a club. Modern hosels are designed to place as little mass as possible over the top of the striking face of the club, which lowers the center of gravity of the club for better distance.

=== Club head ===
Each head has one face which contacts the ball during the stroke. Putters may have two striking faces, as long as they are identical and symmetrical. Some chippers (a club similar in appearance to a double-sided putter but having a loft of 35–45 degrees) have two faces, but are not legal. Page 135 of the 2009 USGA rules of golf states:

The club head must have only one striking face, except that a putter may have two such faces if their characteristics are the same, and they are opposite each other.

Page 127 of the USGA rules of golf states:

A putter is a club with a loft not exceeding ten degrees designed primarily for use on the putting green.

Therefore, any double sided club with a loft greater than 10 degrees is not legal.

=== Ferrule ===
The trim ring, usually black (it may have additional trim colors), that is found directly on top of the hosel on many woods and irons. The ferrule is mostly decorative, creating a continuous line between the shaft and the wider hosel, but in some cases it can form part of the securing mechanism between hosel and shaft. Ferrules of differing weights can fine-tune the center of mass of the overall club head, but for these minute adjustments, screw-in weighted inserts at specific points on the club head are usually used instead.

== Club sets ==
The rules of golf limit each player to a maximum of 14 clubs in their bag. Strict rules prohibit sharing of clubs between players that each have their own set (if two players share clubs, they may not have more than 14 clubs combined), and while occasional lending of a club to a player is generally overlooked, habitual borrowing of other players' clubs or the sharing of a single bag of clubs slows play considerably when both players need the same club.

The most common set of men's clubs is:

- A driver, usually numbered a 1-wood regardless of actual loft, which varies from 8° up to 13°
- A fairway wood, typically numbered a 3-wood and lofted about 15° (though 2- and 4-woods are sometimes seen)
- A matched set of 7 numbered irons from 3 through 9, plus a pitching wedge or "10-iron"
- A sand wedge
- A putter

The above set is only 12 clubs; these (or equivalent hybrid substitutes) are found in virtually every golf bag. To this, players typically add two of the following:

- Another fairway wood, often a 5-wood lofted around 18°, to allow other options besides long irons in the 180–250 yard range,
- A hybrid, typically lofted for similar distance as a 3- or 4-iron and usually replacing instead of supplementing those clubs in the bag, and/or
- An additional wedge, usually either:
  - A gap wedge lofted near 52° to fit between the modern pitching and sand wedges in loft, or
  - A lob wedge, typically lofted around 60°, used for tight approach shots from the rough or sand.
- A chipper.

Women's club sets are similar in overall makeup, but typically have higher lofts and shorter, more flexible shafts in retail sets to accommodate the average female player's height and swing speed.

Variations on this basic set abound; several club options usually exist for almost any shot depending on the player's skill level and playing style, and the only club universally considered to be indispensable is the putter. Some consider the modern deep-faced driver to be equally irreplaceable; this is cause for some debate, as professional players including Tiger Woods have played and won tournaments without using a driver, instead using a 3-wood for tee shots and making up the difference on the approach using a lower-lofted iron.

The most common omissions are the "long irons", numbered from 2 to 5, which are notoriously difficult to hit well. The player can supplement the gaps in distance with either higher-numbered woods such as the 5 and even the 7-wood, or may replace the long irons with equivalently-numbered hybrid clubs. If hybrids are used, higher-lofted woods are often omitted as redundant, but ladies' and seniors' sets commonly feature both hybrids and high-lofted woods, omitting the long irons entirely in favor of the lofted woods, and replacing the mid-irons (5–7) with hybrids. The combination allows for higher launch angles on the long-distance clubs, which gives better distance with slower swing speeds. Where a club is omitted and not replaced with a club of similar function, players may add additional clubs of a different function such as additional wedges.

While 14 clubs is a maximum, it is not a minimum; players are free to use any lesser number of clubs they prefer, so substitutions for the common omissions above are not always made; a player may simply choose to play without a 5-wood or 2–4 irons, instead using a 4-wood and moving directly to their 5-iron as desired distance decreases (a 4-wood in a skilled golfer's hands averages 200 yards; a 5-iron in the same player's hands would be about 160, which is a large gap but not unplayable). Other clubs may be omitted as well. On courses where bags must be carried by the player, the player may take only the odd-numbered irons; without the 4, 6 or 8 irons (the 3 is sometimes removed instead of the 4) the bag's weight is considerably reduced. Carrying only a driver, 3-wood, 4-hybrid, 5–7–9 irons, pitching and sand wedges, and a putter reduces the number of clubs in the bag to 9; this is a common load-out for a "Sunday bag" taken to the driving range or to an informal game.

A skilled player can usually overcome the lesser selection of club lofts by reducing their swing speed on a lower-loft iron and/or placing the ball further forward in their stance to get the same carry distance and/or launch angle as the next higher loft number. Another increasingly common informal format is a deliberately low upper limit such as four clubs, or three clubs plus putter, with a typical load being a wood or hybrid, middle iron, wedge and putter, although often with significant variation between players with regards to which specific clubs are favored in each role.

== Regulations ==
The ruling authorities of golf, The R&A (formerly part of The Royal and Ancient Golf Club of St Andrews) and the United States Golf Association (USGA), reserve the right to define what shapes and physical characteristics of clubs are permissible in tournament play. The current rules for club design, including the results of various rulings on clubs introduced for play, are defined in Appendix II of the Rules of Golf.

The overarching principle of club design used by both authorities is defined in Appendix II-1a, which states: "The club must not be substantially different from the traditional and customary form and make. The club must be composed of a shaft and a head and it may also have material added to the shaft to enable the player to obtain a firm hold (see 3 below). All parts of the club must be fixed so that the club is one unit, and it must have no external attachments." In addition, Appendix II-4a states, regarding club heads, that "the club head must be generally plain in shape. All parts must be rigid, structural in nature and functional. The club head or its parts must not be designed to resemble any other object. It is not practicable to define 'plain in shape' precisely and comprehensively."

These two rules are used as the basis for most of the more specific rules of Appendix II, including that no club may have a concave face (1931) and various rules defining what is "traditional" about the shapes of specific clubs, while allowing for the progression of technology. The "traditional and customary" rule was originally used to ban the introduction of steel club shafts (patented in 1910), as that material was not traditional for shafts; that specific ban was rescinded in 1924 by the USGA (the R&A would continue to ban steel shafts until 1929), and steel would become universal until the development of graphite shafts whose introduction was less controversial. The "plain in shape" rule was more recently bent to allow for non-traditional driver club head shapes, such as squares, as a compromise to club-makers after imposing and enforcing a 460 cm^{3} (28 cu in) volume limit on these same club heads.

Many recently developed woods have a marked "trampoline effect" (a large deformation of the face upon impact followed by a quick restoration to original dimensions, acting like a slingshot), resulting in very high ball speeds and great lengths of tee shots. As of 1 January 2008, the USGA and R&A have settled on a regulation that limits the acceptable "trampoline effect" to a coefficient of restitution (COR)—a measurement of the efficiency of the transfer of energy from the club head to the ball—of 0.830.

Other large scale USGA rulings involve a 1990 lawsuit, and subsequent settlement, against Karsten Manufacturing, makers of the PING brand, for their use of square, or U-grooves in their immensely popular Ping Eye2 irons. The USGA argued that players who used the Eye2 had an unfair advantage in imparting spin on the ball, which helps to stop the ball on the putting greens. The USGA utilized John L. Saksun, founder of Canadian golf company Accuform Golf, as a consultant to set up methods of measuring the unique grooves and determining PING's compliance with the rulings. Saksun, by proposing a cost-effective solution to help PING change the design of subsequent Eye2s, saved PING hundreds of millions. PING subsequently withdrew their US$100 million lawsuit against the USGA. Ping’s older clubs were "grandfathered in" and allowed to remain in play as part of the settlement. However, the USGA has begun phasing in a ban on square grooves in golf. Manufacturers were required to discontinue noncompliant clubs by January 1, 2011.

According to the USGA, as of January 1, 2010, professional golfers on one of the top tours, or those attempting to qualify for one of the three Open Championships (since then four) will need to use new conforming wedges (those without square grooves). Moreover, those who plan to qualify for any other USGA championship (Amateur championships—under 18, Amateur, over 25, and over 50 in both sexes, and four-ball, along with international team championships), will need new conforming wedges by 2014. In addition, this regulation includes IGF and USGA-sanctioned regional amateur events as well, as a "condition of competition". Wedges that conform to the new standard are often marketed as "CC" or "Condition of Competition" wedges; this moniker is likely to fall into disuse as players upgrade clubs and the use of non-conforming irons diminishes.

== See also ==
- Golf glossary
- Golf cart
- Obsolete golf clubs
- Solar Golf Cart
