= Ping (golf) =

Manufacturer of golf clubs, bags, and apparel

Ping, Inc.
- Type: Private
- Industry: Sports equipment
- Founded: 1959; 67 years ago
- Founder: Karsten Solheim
- Headquarters: Phoenix, Arizona, U.S.
- Key people: John A. Solheim, Chairman and CEO
- Products: Golf clubs, bags
- Website: ping.com

Ping, Inc. (stylized as PING) is an American sports equipment manufacturing company based in Phoenix, Arizona. It focuses on golf equipment, producing golf clubs and golf bags. The company was founded by Karsten Solheim, following a career as an engineer at General Electric. In 1959, he started making putters in his garage in Redwood City, California. In 1967, he resigned from his job at General Electric to develop the PING company.

== History ==
=== Beginnings ===
Solheim began PING golf as a garage business in 1959. His frustration during the game of golf resulted from his difficulty putting with the equipment of the era. The engineer from General Electric invented a new putter in his garage known as the "PING 1A". Instead of attaching the shaft at the heel of the blade, he attached it in the center. He applied scientific principles to golf club design, which had previously been based largely on trial and error, transferring much of the weight of the club head to the perimeter.

The name "PING" came from the sound that Solheim heard as the metal struck the ball. Popular musician-golfer Murray Arnold shared in 1960 that the clubhead, on striking the ball, rings out with the 440 pitch used in tuning pianos. By the end of 1960, Solheim had 6 designs, intentionally muffled the "ping", and had made over 2,000 putters in his garage.

In 1961, the Solheims moved from Redwood City, California, to Phoenix, Arizona, where the company would find a permanent home. Despite the increasing sales of the PING putter, Solheim continued to create his putters single-handedly in his garage after departing General Electric.

In the same year, he invented his first set of irons which he named "69", which he considered to be a good round of golf. Solheim continued to experiment with the effects of good heel-toe weighting in his irons and also milled a cavity into the steel back of the irons for added forgiveness.

The first PGA Tour victory while using a PING club came in 1962 at the Cajun Classic Open Invitational by John Barnum. Sales of the PING putters rose as the popularity steadily increased. The Golf World Cup of 1965 brought even greater sales of the garage-made PING putters as many of the top players used the PING putters during the televised event in Japan.

=== Later years ===
In 1966, Solheim had an idea for a new putter flash in his mind. As he was unable to find a piece of paper, the design for his new putter was sketched on the dust cover of a 78 RPM record. After Solheim had finalized the design, he was still in need for a name. Solheim's wife Louise suggested the name "Answer" for the new putter as it "was an answer for the vexing problems in putting". As the name "Answer" would be too long to fit on the putter, the name was shortened to just "Anser". Additionally, without a W, Anser could be trademarked.

PING faced a major obstacle at the end of 1966 as the USGA, golf's governing body for rules and equipment, outlawed all PING putters other than the Anser for tournament and handicap play. The decision came as the other PING models had a special bend in the shaft located under the grip which was thought to give players a special advantage in the putting stroke.

Acceptance came when Julius Boros won the PGA Tour's Phoenix Open, using Solheim's "Anser" putter in early 1967. Later that year, Solheim resigned from G.E., moved his business from his garage to a factory and established Karsten Manufacturing Corporation (KMC) makers of the Ping brand of clubs in Phoenix, Arizona. The patent for the PING Anser putter came on March 21, 1967. The first major championship to be won using a PING putter came in 1969 at the Masters. In 1969, Ping introduced irons based on the same principle of perimeter weighting, and these were quickly successful. The other golf equipment manufacturers soon followed Ping's innovations, which became industry standards. The last major innovation by PING during the 1960s came with K1 stainless cast steel iron set.

== Legacy ==
During a White House meeting between President Donald Trump and Norwegian prime minister Erna Solberg on January 10, 2018, Solberg gave Trump a Ping "Bergen" Putter as a gift as a symbol of the close ties between the nations, and the history of Norwegian immigration to the United States. Born in Norway, Ping's founder Karsten Solheim was from Austrheim, outside Bergen; as a toddler, he moved with his family to Seattle, Washington.

== Fitting innovation ==
Ping was the first manufacturer to offer high-quality cast clubs using investment casting which both reduced costs, allowed better quality control for high tech features, and set the stage for manufactured fitting.

Ping was also the first to offer factory fitting, via a variety of clubheads in different lies and offsets. Beginning about 1980, Ping began offering their fitting program based on a checklist of the player's physical characteristics, common problems, and distances.

The 2011 checklist at the Ping website contained approximately 100 data inputs and was part of a 5-step fitting process covering everything from driver to putter.

To make custom fitting more feasible, Ping manufactures some iron clubheads with a small notch in the clubhead. The notch allows the clubhead to be bent to the required specification without the danger of breaking the clubhead as was the problem for previous models.

== Sponsorships ==
Ping has maintained endorsement deals with many professional golfers playing on the leading tours, including Tony Finau, Viktor Hovland, Louis Oosthuizen, Sahith Theegala, Bubba Watson and Lee Westwood.
