= Calloway =

Calloway may refer to:

== People ==
- A. J. Calloway (born 1974), American TV personality
- Auburn Calloway, flight engineer of FedEx Express who nearly hijacked FedEx Flight 705
- Bertha Calloway (1925–2017), African-American community activist and historian
- Blanche Calloway (1902–1978), American jazz singer, bandleader, and composer
- Cab Calloway (1907–1994), American jazz singer and bandleader
- Caroline Calloway (born 1991), American social media celebrity and author
- Chris Calloway (born 1968), American football player
- Clinton J. Calloway (1869–1940), African-American educator and school administrator
- Colin G. Calloway (born 1953), British-American historian
- D. Wayne Calloway (1935–1998), American businessman
- Dave Calloway (born 1968), American college basketball coach
- David Calloway, American football coach and former player
- DeVerne Lee Calloway (1916–1993), American politician
- Don Calloway (born 1979), American attorney and politician
- Donald Calloway (born 1972), Catholic priest, author, and speaker
- Doris Calloway (1923–2001), American nutritionist
- Earl Calloway (born 1983), American-born Bulgarian basketball player
- Ernie Calloway (1948—2023), American football player
- Frank Calloway (1915–2014), American self-taught artist
- Greg Calloway, American entrepreneur, artist and filmmaker
- James Nathan Calloway (1865–after 1930), American agriculturalist
- Jordan Calloway (born 1990), American actor
- Joseph R. Calloway, United States Army general
- Josh Calloway (born 1979), American politician
- Kate Calloway (born 1957), American crime fiction author
- Kyle Calloway (1987–2016), American football player
- Laurie Calloway (born 1945), English former footballer
- Maggie Calloway (1910–2000), Filipina-American actress
- Marie Calloway (born 1990), American writer
- Nathaniel Oglesby Calloway (1907–1979), American chemist and physician
- Northern J. Calloway (1948–1990), American actor and singer
- Reggie Calloway (born 1955), American singer-songwriter and record producer
- Rick Calloway (born 1966), American former basketball player
- Rob Calloway (born 1969), American boxer
- Ron Calloway (born 1976), American baseball player
- Sway Calloway (born 1971), MTV reporter and producer
- Terry Calloway (born 1954), American politician
- Thomas J. Calloway (1866–1930), African-American journalist, educator and lawyer
- Vanessa Bell Calloway (born 1957), American actress

== Other ==
- Calloway (band), American pop music group featuring the Calloway brothers – Reginald and Vincent
- Calloway County, Kentucky
- Calloway School of Business and Accountancy

== See also ==
- Calaway, several people
- Callaway (disambiguation)
- Galloway (disambiguation)
- Kellaway, several people
