= Callaway =

Callaway may refer to:

== Places in the United States ==
- Callaway, Florida
- Callaway, Maryland
- Callaway, Minnesota
- Callaway, Missouri
- Callaway, Nebraska
- Callaway, Virginia
- Calloway County, Kentucky
- Callaway County, Missouri
- Callaway Township, Minnesota
- Callaway Gardens, Pine Mountain, Georgia
- Callaway Nuclear Generating Station, Missouri

== Other uses ==
- Callaway (surname)
- Callaway Arts & Entertainment, a publishing, licensing and animation company
- Callaway Cars, automobile engineering and tuning company
- Callaway Golf Company, American producer of golf sporting equipment

== See also ==
- Calaway (disambiguation)
- Calloway
