= Spalding (company) =

Sporting goods company

- Type: Subsidiary
- Founded: 1876; 150 years ago
- Founder: Albert Spalding
- Headquarters: Bowling Green, Kentucky
- Parent: Fruit of the Loom
- Subsidiaries: Dudley
- Website: spalding.com

Spalding is an American sports equipment manufacturing company. It was founded by Albert Spalding in Chicago in 1876 as a baseball manufacturer, and is today headquartered in Bowling Green, Kentucky. It sells softballs through its subsidiary Dudley Sports. In the past, Spalding has manufactured balls for other sports, including American football, soccer, basketball, volleyball, tennis, and golf. The company created the first basketball in 1894.

For a brief period in the 1980s, Spalding was also a designer of aftermarket automotive wheels.

== History ==
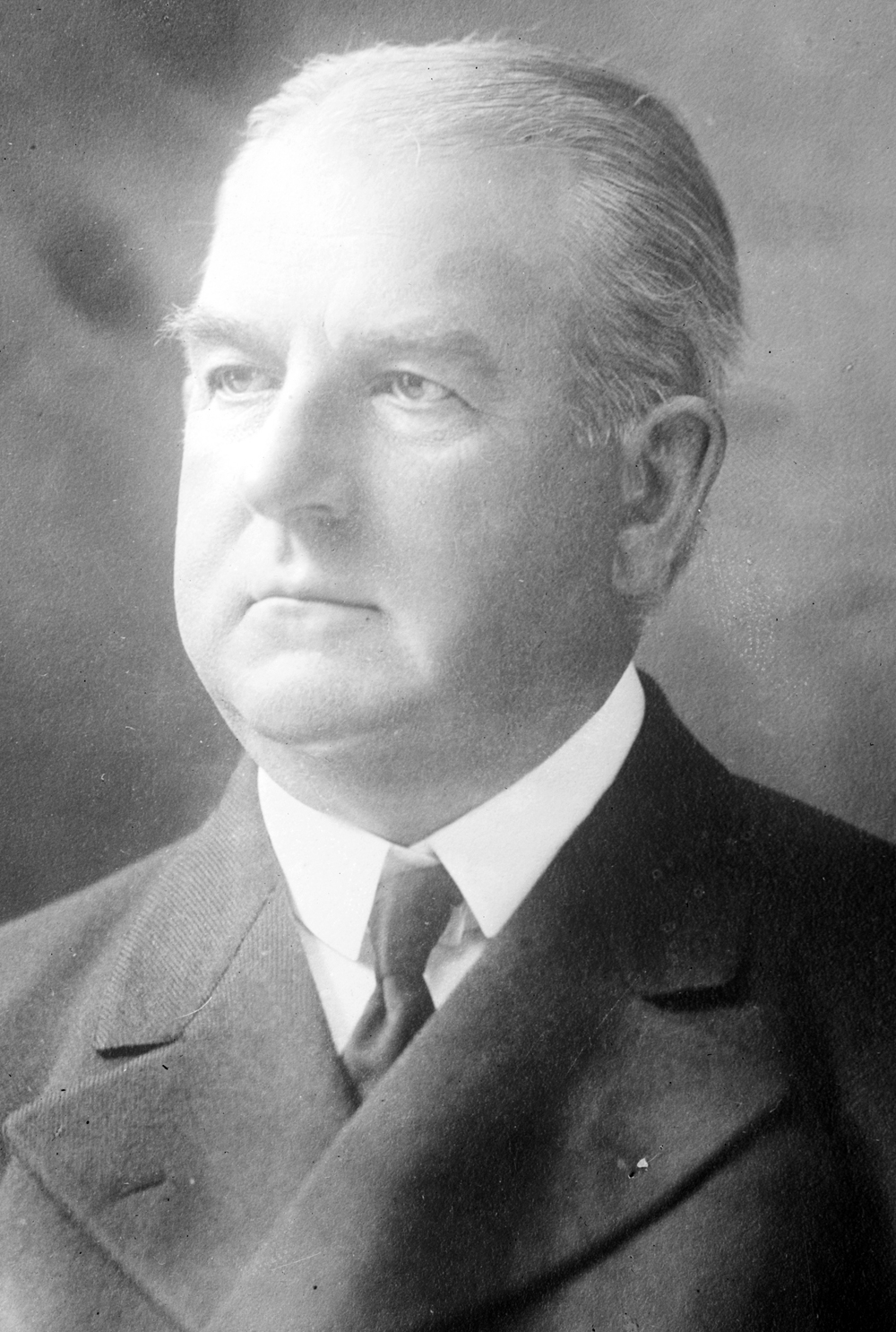
Albert Spalding, founder of the company, in 1910

The Spalding "League Ball" was adopted by the National League and used by the league since 1880, as well as by the American Association of Professional Base Ball Clubs for the seasons of 1892–1896. It was manufactured by A. G. Spalding & Bros., Chicago, New York & Philadelphia and sold for $1.50 in 1896. In 1892, Spalding acquired rival sporting goods companies Wright & Ditson and A. J. Reach.

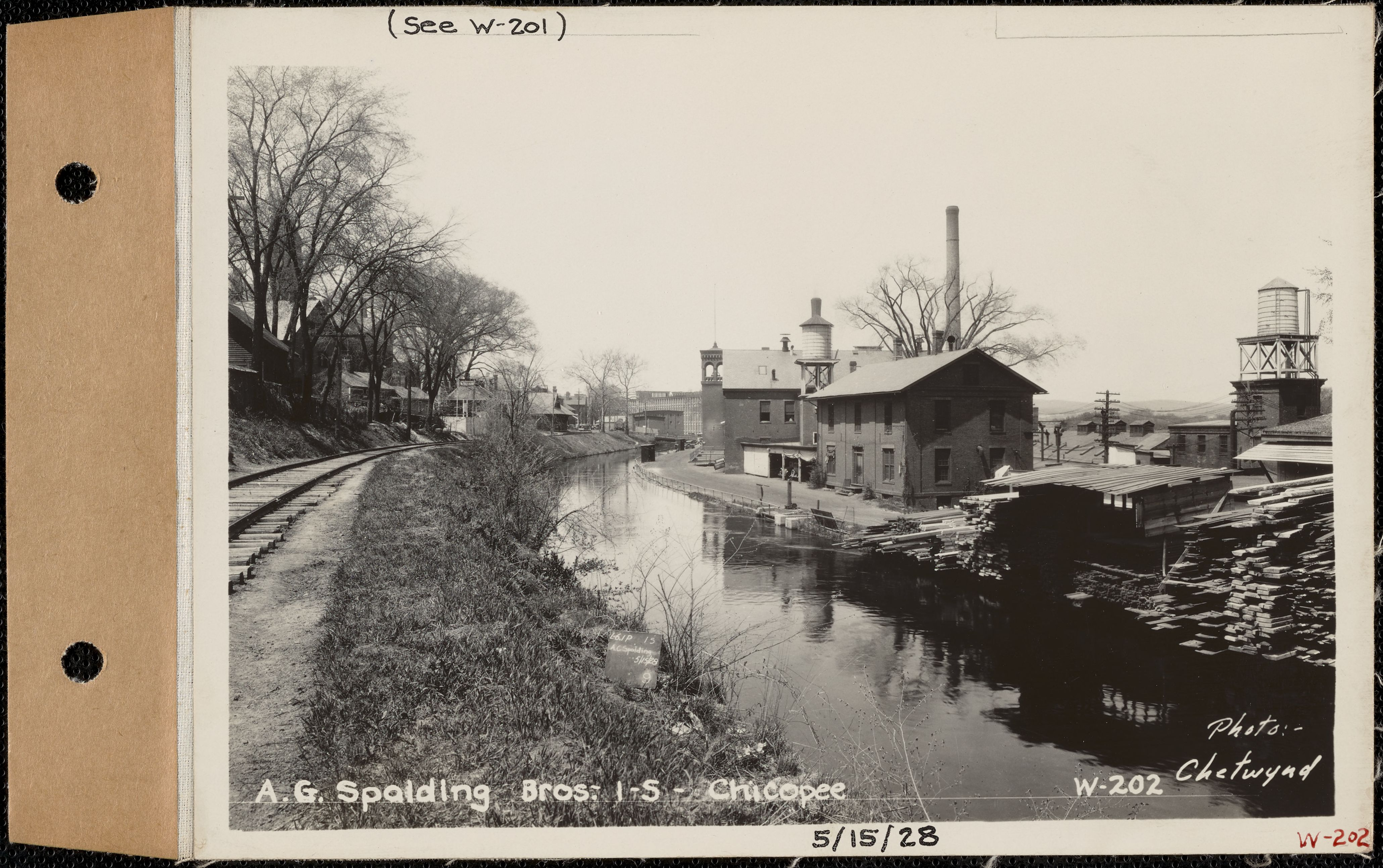
A.G. Spalding Brothers Co., 1-S, Chicopee, Mass., May 15, 1928. Massachusetts. Executive Office of Energy and Environmental Affairs, Metropolitan District Water Supply Commission, Quabbin Reservoir, Photographs of Real Estate Takings, Massachusetts Archives

In 1893, A.G. Spalding & Brothers purchased the Lamb Knitting Machine Company of Chicopee Falls, Massachusetts, and renamed it the Lamb Manufacturing Company. It used this purchase to consolidate its ice skate manufactory from Newark and its gymnasium goods manufactory from Philadelphia to the Chicopee plant. Lamb, primarily engaged in manufacturing knitting machines, rifles, and egg-beaters, had been fulfilling a contract since 1890 to produce the Credenda bicycle wheel for Spalding. Spalding chose Chicopee because it was the home of the Overman Wheel Company since it acted as their distributor in the Western USA, and Mr. Overman contracted with Lamb to make wheels for its lower-end products.

Production of bicycles continued at the Chicopee plant through the latter part of the 19th century, but in 1899 A.G. Ben Spalding sold its bicycle division to a massive trust called the American Bicycle Company which controlled 65% of the bicycle business in the US.

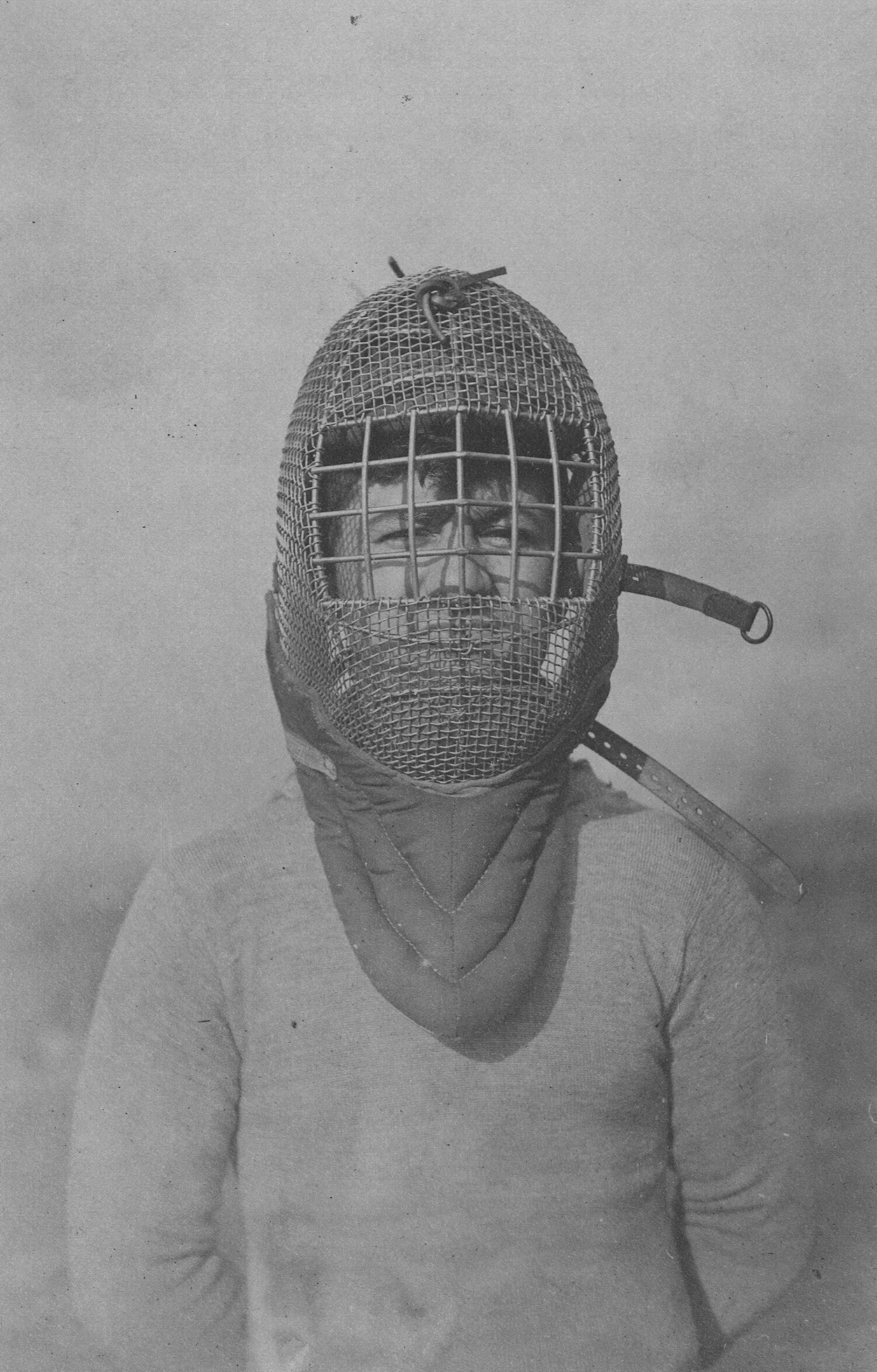
An infantry fencing mask made by A.G. Spalding & Brothers Co. for the U.S. Government

By 1900, Spalding was selling dumbbells, Indian clubs, and punching bags. During 1916, Spalding was selling a wide variety of sports-related items, including clothing (athletic shirts, belts, pads, hats, jackets, jerseys, pants, shoes, and swimming suits), barbells, fencing blades and foils, golf clubs, guy robes, measuring tapes, pulleys and weights, rowing machines, track equipment (discus, hurdles, hammers, javelins, poles for vaulting, shotputs, and stop watches), and whistles. By 1919, A.G. Spalding & Brothers had developed infantry and cavalry fencing masks for the U.S. Government.

During World War II the company joined five other firms to form the New England Small Arms Corporation for manufacture of M1918 Browning Automatic Rifles. A.G. Spalding, as a subcontractor to Sprague Electric Co., also produced parts for the "toothpick" capacitors that were used with the VT proximity fuse.

From the early 1930s through the mid-1940s Spalding produced the official game pucks for the National Hockey League. Spalding produced the well-known "Spaldeen" high-bounce rubber ball, said to be a re-use of defective tennis ball cores, that was sold to city children from 1949. In baseball, Spalding manufactured the official ball of the Major Leagues through the 1976 season, using the Reach brand on American League balls and the Spalding trademark on the National League's. Since 1977 the official ball for MLB has been made by Rawlings.

From 1981, in a partnership with the Toyo Rubber Company of Japan, Spalding designed a series of aftermarket automotive wheels known as the "Message" series. It was one of these wheels, the Message II, purportedly described by the company as like a "steam locomotive piston" which won awards from publications such as Motorfan Magazine as the best spoke type wheel and reader's overall choice. Wheels bearing the Spalding name are known to have been manufactured through to at least 1986.

In August 1996, Spalding was acquired by Kohlberg Kravis Roberts.

Spalding became a division of the Russell Corporation in 2003—exclusive of its golf operations (which included the Top-Flite, Ben Hogan and Strata brands), which were eventually bought by the Callaway Golf Company later the same year.

In April 2006, Berkshire Hathaway announced a merger with Russell Corporation (including Spalding), which was finalized in August 2006 for approximately $600 million.

== Products ==
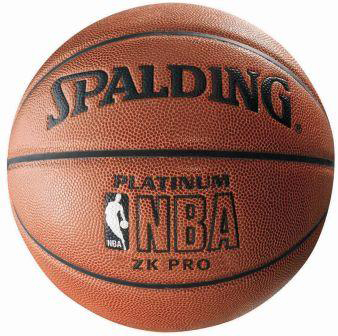
An example of a Spalding NBA ball, the ZK Pro Platinum

Spalding has manufactured balls for baseball, softball, American football, soccer, volleyball, tennis, and golf. For a brief period in the 1980s, Spalding was also a designer of aftermarket automotive wheels.

=== Basketball ===
Spalding developed its first basketball in 1894 based on the design of a baseball, and is currently a leading producer. Spalding was the official game ball supplier to the National Basketball Association (NBA) from 1983 to 2021, when the league reunited with Wilson after 37 years.

In 2006, Spalding and the NBA announced that they would create a new NBA Official Game Ball for the 2006–07 NBA season, with interlocking segments and made with a synthetic leather instead of real animal leather. However, many NBA players complained that the new composite ball became extremely slick after use, wouldn't bounce as high, bounced awkwardly off the rim and backboard, and cut their fingers. In response, the NBA reverted to the old leather balls (with the old eight-panel pattern) on January 1, 2007.

=== American football ===
Prior to the AFL–NFL merger, Spalding produced the American Football League's game ball, the J5V (or J5-V), which was 1/4 in (0.64 cm) narrower and 1/4 in (0.64 cm) longer than the NFL football, "The Duke" by Wilson. The Canadian Football League used the J5-V as its official game ball until 1995, where it switched to a Wilson ball similar to the NFL's.

The XFL (2001) game balls were produced by Spalding. The ball was black with a red "X" going across the sides of the ball.

The company was the official game ball supplier of the first and second incarnations Arena Football League, an indoor American football league, from 2004 until its 2019 shutdown; the Horween Leather Company supplied leather to Spalding those balls.

=== Other sports ===
Spalding golf ball from c. 2010.

The company was one of the first to use high-profile athletes to endorse its products when tennis player Pancho Gonzales was signed to an exclusive endorsement contract in 1951.

Spalding sells softballs through its subsidiary Dudley Sports.

== Spalding Athletic Library ==
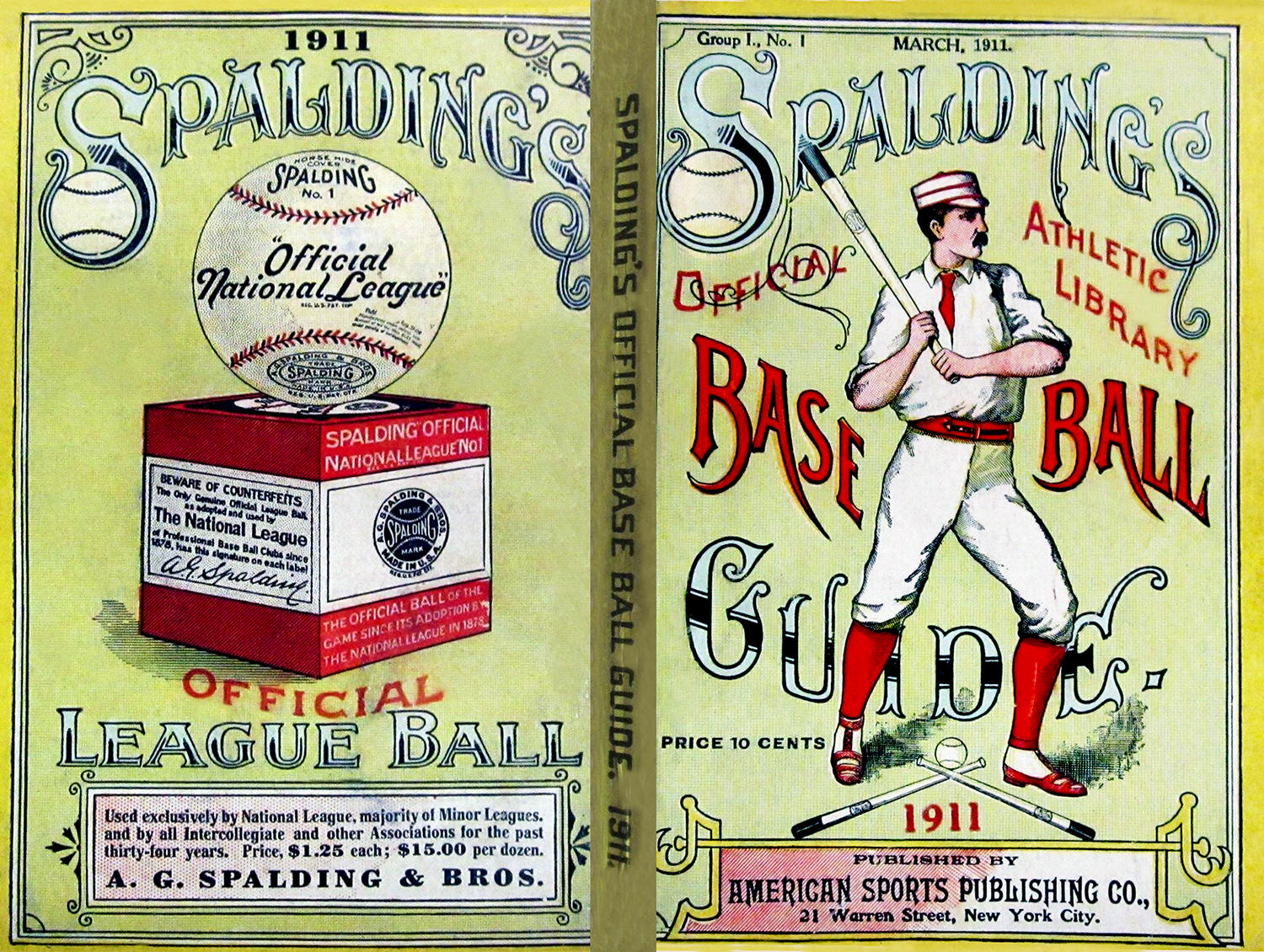
Wrap cover of Spalding's Athletic Library Baseball: Base Ball, published in 1911. The company commercialized a large variety of sports publications between the end of the 19th century to the 1910s.

In 1892 Spalding created the Spalding Athletic Library, which sold sports and exercise books through its American Sports Publishing Company, also founded that year.

The first book published was Life and Battles of James J. Corbett, Volume 1, Number 1 in 1892. The book includes stories of Corbett's past opponents. The first book was published under: Spalding's Athletic Library, American Sports Publishing Company, New York. The editor of the first book was Richard K. Fox, and Corbett was referred to as the California Wonder.

In the baseball series, legend Ty Cobb wrote "Strategy in the Outfield." In the self defense series, Jiu Jitsu techniques are modeled by A. Minami and K. Koyama.

The Spalding Athletic Library covered a variety of sports, exercises, and organizations. The Brooklyn Daily Eagle newspaper stated regarding this collection, "devoted to all athletics pastimes, indoor and outdoor, and is the recognized American cyclopedia of sport". The company's last publication was in 1941.

An article by the Society for American Baseball Research (SABR) states, "It lasted for many years and enjoyed the greatest success of any publication of its kind."

Advertisements inside books available from Spalding included archery, athletics (track and field; all around; cross country running; and marathon), badminton, baseball, basketball, bicycling, bowling, boxing, canoeing, cricket, croquet, curling, fencing, (American) football, golf, gymnast, handball, hockey, jujutsu, lacrosse, lawn sports, polo, pushball, quoits, racquetball, rowing, rugby, skating, soccer, squash, swimming, tennis, tumbling, volleyball, and wrestling. Bodybuilding books included the dumbbell, Indian club, medicine ball, and pulley weights. Sporting books for organizations included Amateur Athletic Union (AAU), IC4A, National Collegiate Athletic Association (NCAA), Olympics, public schools, and the YMCA.

Spalding produced a mail-order catalog that provided a description, price, and picture of their sports equipment, sports books, and exercise books. A couple of examples are "How to Play Golf" for 25 cents, "How to Play Basketball" at 10 cents, and "How to Train for Bicycling" at 10 cents.

Spalding Co. purchased Wright & Ditson Co. in 1892 and A.J. Reach Co. in 1889. For several years after the purchases, Wright & Ditson and A.J. Reach continued to publish sports books separately from the Spalding Athletic Library name. Professional baseball player George Wright co-founded Wright & Ditson Co.; and professional baseball player Al Reach founded A.J. Reach Co. The Spalding Baseball Guides were published under A.G. Spalding & Bros. until 1893–1894, and starting in 1894–1895 by American Sports Publishing Company (but not using the Spalding Athletic Library name).

== Sponsorships ==
Spalding is the official ball provider of the following leagues and associations, as well as it has deals with exclusive agreements with some prominent athletes:

=== American football ===
- China Arena Football League (CAFL)

=== Basketball ===
==== Leagues & Associations ====
- (Canada) Canadian Elite Basketball League (CEBL)
- (Chile) Liga Nacional de Basketball (LNB)
- (Europe) EuroLeague
- (Europe) EuroCup
- (France) Ligue Nationale de Basket (LNB)
- (Greece) Greek Basket League (GBL)
- Kosovo Basketball Superleague
- (Mongolia) Mongolian National Association (MNBA)
- (United States) ABA
- (United States) NAIA
- (United States) NJCAA
- (United States) KHSAA
- (United States) USCAA
- (Australia) National Basketball League (NBL)
- (Australia) Women's National Basketball League (WNBL)
- Vietnam Basketball Association (VBA)

==== National teams ====
- Andorra
- Austria
- Chile
- (Republic of the Congo) Congo
- Cyprus
- Denmark
- Gabon (from 2022)
- (Georgia (country)) Georgia
- Gibraltar
- Mexico
- Netherlands
- Romania
- Uruguay

==== Club teams ====
- (Belgium) Antwerp Giants
- (Chile) Club Deportivo Universidad Católica
- (Denmark) Horsens IC
- (Denmark) Svendborg Rabbits
- (France) Olympique Antibes
- (France) Cholet
- (Germany) ETB Essen
- (Germany) Oettinger Rockets
- (Germany) ratiopharm Ulm
- (Germany) Telekom Baskets Bonn
- (Germany) Würzburg Baskets
- (Hungary) Falco KC
- (Hungary) Szolnoki Olaj KK
- (Italy) Kleb Basket Ferrara
- (Italy) Magnolia Basket Campobasso
- (Italy) Ravenna
- (Italy) Pallacanestro Varese
- (Japan) SAN-EN NeoPhoenix
- Monaco
- (Montenegro) Budućnost
- (Montenegro) KK Sutjeska Nikšić
- (Poland) Basket Zielona Góra
- (Poland) Stal Ostrów Wielkopolski
- (Poland) Turów Zgorzelec
- (Romania) Asesoft Ploiești
- (Spain) Joventut Badalona
- (Spain) CB Gran Canaria
- (Spain) Baloncesto Málaga
- (Spain) Real Betis Energía Plus

=== Boules ===
- (Italy) Federazione Italiana Bocce

==== Other teams ====
- (United States) Harlem Globetrotters (until they Split to Baden)

=== Volleyball ===
- (Italy) Cuneo Volley
- (United States) Sandbox Volleyball

==== Testimonials ====
- (United States) Karch Kiraly

== See also ==
- Robert Hathaway, chief of the firm's London branch who became ruler of the Channel Islands royal fief of Sark
