= Kelleway =

Kelleway is a surname. Notable people with the surname include:

- Charlie Kelleway (1886–1944), Australian cricketer
- Lionel Kelleway (born 1944), British radio presenter

== See also ==
- Kellaway
