= Murnan (surname) =

Murnan is a surname. Notable people with the surname include:

- Joe Murnan (born 1983), English darts player
- Monica Murnan (born 1966), American politician

== See also ==
- Jean-Bernard Gauthier de Murnan (1748–1796), French military officer
