= Kellaway =

Kellaway is a surname, and may refer to

- Andrew Kellaway (Australian rules footballer) (born 1975), Australian football player
- Andrew Kellaway, Australian rugby player
- Bob Kellaway, Australian rugby league footballer
- Cecil Kellaway, British actor
- Charles Kellaway, Australian medical scientist and science administrator
- Duncan Kellaway, Australian football player
- Frederick Kellaway, British politician
- Joseph Kellaway, British sailor and recipient of the Victoria Cross
- Lionel Kelleway, British radio presenter
- Lucy Kellaway, British newspaper columnist
- Roger Kellaway, American composer
- Stuart Kellaway, Australian musician, founder member of Yothu Yindi

== See also ==
- Calloway
- Kelleway
