= Calaway =

Calaway is a surname of English and French origin. Notable people with the surname include:

- James C. Calaway (1931–2018), American businessman
- Mark Calaway (born 1965), American professional wrestler who performs for WWE under the ring name The Undertaker
- Paul K. Calaway (1910–1993), American chemical engineer

== See also ==
- Calaway Park, a Canadian amusement park
- Callaway (surname)
