= Steven Reinemund =

American businessman (born 1948)

Steven S. Reinemund
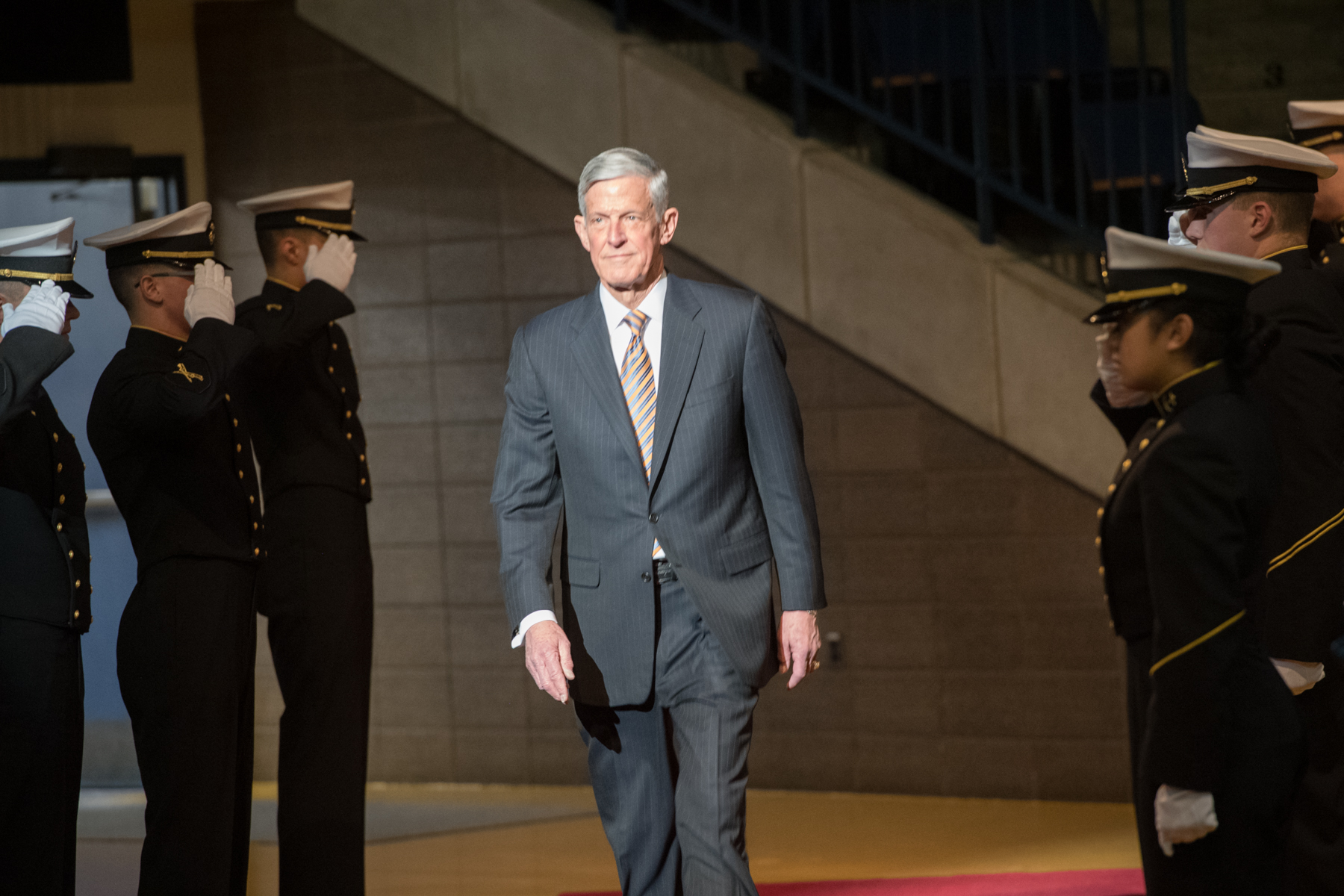
- Reinemund in 2018
- Born: April 6, 1948 (age 78); New York, New York
- Education: U.S. Naval Academy (B.S.); University of Virginia (M.B.A.)
- Employers: Wake Forest University (2008-2014); PepsiCo (1984-2006)
- Title: Dean/CEO
- Political party: Republican
- Board member of: The Cooper Institute 2003-present Johnson & Johnson 2003-2007; American Express 2007-2015; ExxonMobil 2007-Present; Marriott International 2007-Present; Wal-Mart 2010-Present; Chick-fil-A 2015-Present; Vertiv 2020-Present
- Spouse: Gail T. Reinemund
- Children: 4

Steven S. Reinemund (born April 6, 1948) is an American businessman who was chairman and chief executive officer of PepsiCo between 2001 and 2006 and dean of the Schools of Business at Wake Forest University between 2008 and 2014. Reinemund spent 22 years working for PepsiCo in various capacities. During his CEO tenure at PepsiCo, revenues grew by $9 billion, net income rose 70%, earnings per share were up 80% and PepsiCo's market cap exceeded $100 billion. He led the acquisitions of several other food and beverage companies including Quaker Oats, Naked Juice, Izze and Stacy's Chips.

== Early career ==
Reinemund is a former captain, serving for five years in the United States Marine Corps after he graduated from the United States Naval Academy with a Bachelor of Science degree in 1970. Part of his five years in the military, Reinemund served as a guard at the White House during the administrations of Richard Nixon and Gerald Ford.

After leaving the military, Reinemund held various positions at IBM and Marriott's Roy Rogers division in addition to earning an MBA at the Darden Business School at UVA in 1978.

== PepsiCo ==
In 1984, Reinemund joined PepsiCo's Pizza Hut division (subsequently divested) as the Senior Vice President of Operations. Two years later, he was named President & CEO of Pizza Hut in North America where he introduced home-delivery as a distribution method, overtaking market share of rival Domino's Pizza within 2 years. In 1991, Reinemund assumed the role of president and CEO of Pizza Hut Worldwide. Reinemund then moved to PepsiCo's Frito-Lay division in 1992, serving as president and CEO for seven years before being promoted to the position of PepsiCo president and COO in 1999. In 2001 the board of PepsiCo named Reinemund chairman and CEO.

In each of his last two full years as CEO of PepsiCo., Reinemund was paid a base salary of $1 million and an annual bonus of $4.5 million.

== Academia ==
On April 22, 2008, Reinemund was named dean of the Calloway School of Business and Accountancy and Babcock Graduate School of Management at Wake Forest University.

On June 30, 2014 Reinemund stepped down as Dean of the Business, electing to remain with the university as Executive-in-Residence.

== Boards ==
In 2003, Reinemund was elected to the boards of Johnson & Johnson and the Cooper Institute. He was named to the Board of Trustees at Furman University effective July 2012. Reinemund also serves on the board of the U.S. Naval Academy Foundation. and served on the advisory board of the Salvation Army.

In 2007, as he was preparing to retire from Pepsi, Reinemund joined the corporate boards of American Express, Marriott International, and ExxonMobil. Three years later he joined the Walmart board. In 2010, according to the companies' proxy statements, he was paid $927,318 to serve on these boards.

Since 2020, Reinemund has served as a member of the board of directors of Vertiv.

== Awards and recognition ==
- Businessweek's Top 25 "Managers of the Year" (2002, 2005)
- Barron's "World's Most Respected CEO List" (2005, 2006)
- Salvation Army Evangeline Booth Award (2007)
- Horatio Alger Award (2020)
- Honorary doctorate degree (Johnson and Wales University)
- Honorary doctorate degree (Bryant University)

Business positions
Preceded by Roger Enrico	Chairman & CEO of PepsiCo; 2001 – 2006	Succeeded by Indra Nooyi
