= Ben Hogan Golf Company =

American sports equipment brand

Ben Hogan Golf
- Product type: Golf equipment, apparel
- Current owner: Perry Ellis International
- Country: United States
- Introduced: 1953
- Markets: Sports equipment
- Previous owners: American Machine and Foundry (1960–1984); Irwin L. Jacobs (1984–1988); Cosmo World (1988–1992); Bill Goodwin (1992–1997); Spalding (1997–2003); Callaway Golf Company (2003–2012)

The Ben Hogan Golf Company is an American brand of sports equipment founded by professional golfer Ben Hogan in 1953.

The company was acquired by American Machine and Foundry in 1960 and it became one of the leading manufacturers of golf clubs during the 1970s. The company went through a number of ownership changes from the 1980s to 1990s and its standing in the industry declined. Callaway Golf Company bought the brand out of bankruptcy in 2003 and discontinued it five years later. The company's branding rights were purchased in 2012 by Perry Ellis International, which resumed the sale of Hogan-branded golf apparel and accessories. As of 2023, two attempts have been made to revive Hogan-branded golf clubs through a direct-to-consumer business model.

== Founding and early years ==
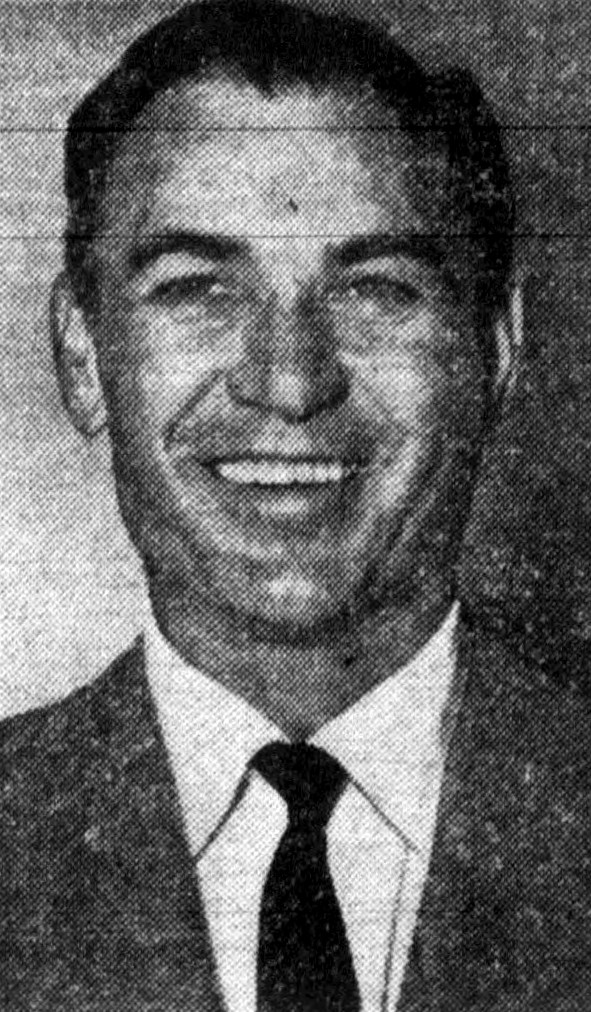
Company founder Ben Hogan in 1953

Ben Hogan was an American professional golfer. Following his win at the 1953 Open Championship, Hogan returned home to Fort Worth, Texas, where he secured a lathe from an armory as well as a building complex to manufacture and market golf clubs. Hogan had been affiliated with the equipment company MacGregor Golf since 1937. This relationship dissolved when Hogan refused to use the MacGregor ball during his 1953 season, in which he won the Triple Crown. He had decided prior to this that he would start his own equipment company.

In October 1953, Hogan announced the creation of the Ben Hogan Company. He sent a letter to golf club professionals asking them to support his venture, stating: "These clubs shall be as near perfect as modern day tools and instruments can perform." Hogan's business associates Pollard Simons and Marvin Leonard were the biggest initial investors in the company. Hogan's perfectionism towards golf carried over to manufacturing, and in 1954 he scrapped the first batch of clubs that were produced due to them not meeting his standards. Simons was shocked at this decision, as the batch was worth around $100,000 (equivalent to $1.2 million in 2025). Hogan subsequently borrowed $450,000 from a bank to buy out Simons' stake. Leonard remained supportive of the company and later formed a group, which included Bing Crosby, to take Hogan's name off the loan.

Marketed as clubs for "the better player", the company utilized Hogan's image strongly in its advertising. Due to a small budget, Hogan was unable to pay the top players at the time to use his clubs as they already had contracts with established brands such as MacGregor, Spalding, and Wilson. The first player to win a tournament using Hogan's clubs was the previously unknown Jack Fleck, who defeated Hogan himself in a playoff at the 1955 U.S. Open. Hogan sought to design top-end products and made innovations, such as fitting long irons with stiffer shafts than short irons. This idea was later adopted by other equipment manufacturers. The company struggled to gain prominence against established rivals in the industry, and Hogan decided to sell the company as raising operating capital became troublesome.

== Sale to AMF and success ==
American Machine and Foundry (AMF) acquired the company in 1960, at a price of around $3.7 million (equivalent to $40 million in 2025). Hogan received cash as well as equity in AMF. After the sale to AMF, he was appointed director of the Ben Hogan Golf Company and continued designing and manufacturing clubs. He also had input in the company's sales and marketing policies. As the company used his name, Hogan viewed it as a representation of himself.

Hogan designed prototype clubs alongside manufacturer Gene Sheeley, including a metal driver in the early 1960s. The club was not brought to market and drivers made of persimmon wood continued to be used on the PGA Tour until TaylorMade introduced a metal driver in 1979. Hogan designed the Apex model of irons in 1972. It had a traditional, forged-blade style, which Hogan favored over the cavity-back, investment-cast models that were beginning to gain popularity. Hogan believed such clubs reduced the player's feel and ability to discern if a shot had been struck properly. The Apex line of irons was successful, and it became a platform for Hogan's experimentation with weight distribution and sole design ideas. He also designed the Apex shaft, which James Achenbach of Golfweek said in 2013 is "sometimes called golf's first lightweight shaft."

The company had annual revenue of around $4 million in the late 1960s, but flourished in the 1970s and became the highest-selling club manufacturer in golf course shops. By 1980, sales had increased tenfold to over $40 million (equivalent to $156 million in 2025). In addition to clubs, the company produced golf balls, which became the top money-winning ball used on the PGA Tour in the mid-to-late 1970s but struggled to gain commercial market share against Titleist and Top-Flite balls. The company also attempted to enter the putter business. A line of wooden-shafted putters created without Hogan's input in the late 1970s was a failure and the company was left with around $125,000 worth of unwanted inventory. Hogan disliked the putters and suggested that they should simply be burned, but they were instead bartered as part of a television commercial deal.

== Decline and ownership changes ==
In late 1979, AMF appointed a new president of the company, who reduced Hogan's role in the business and removed him from its commercials. The company also shifted focus from selling in shops at golf courses to off-course stores; the strategy was unsuccessful and the business began to struggle financially. Hogan disagreed with the company's mass merchandise approach. He believed consumers should receive fitting from a golf professional before buying clubs and was enraged upon learning that Hogan clubs had begun to be sold in discount stores. As he lacked support from AMF executives at the time, Hogan was unable to reverse the company's direction.

AMF sold the Ben Hogan Golf Company in 1984 to vulture investor Irwin L. Jacobs for $15 million (equivalent to $46 million in 2025). This was part of Jacobs' hostile takeover of AMF, which was completed in 1985. The company reported losses of $2.5 million in the year following the takeover. A new president was hired, who convinced Hogan that the company should release a line of easy-to-hit, cavity-backed irons for high handicap golfers, similar to ones marketed at the time by Ping. Hogan advertized the new clubs in television commercials and the company returned to profitability.

In 1988, the company was acquired for $55 million (equivalent to $150 million in 2025) by Cosmo World, a group of Japanese investors who later bought Pebble Beach Golf Links. After the acquisition, Hogan said: "Mr. Isutani, you've bought the family jewels. Don't fuck it up." The company began primarily focusing on the Japanese market and Hogan's influence on the company decreased. In 1992, Cosmo World was in financial distress and sold the company to Bill Goodwin, who had bought AMF Bowling in 1986. Sports Business Journal stated that Goodwin paid $61 million (equivalent to $140 million in 2025). Goodwin had no background in golf and began cost-cutting measures, including the move of manufacturing from its long-term base in Fort Worth to a plant in Richmond, Virginia, in order to avail of non-union workers. Hogan's secretary Sharon Rea recalled: "It very much saddened him when the company moved out of Fort Worth. He didn't have any children and this was his baby." Less than a quarter of the company's employees moved to the new factory in Virginia, and revenue declined from over $60 million to around $10 million during Goodwin's ownership.

Following Hogan's death in 1997, the manufacturing returned to Fort Worth after Spalding bought the brand, for $14.6 million (equivalent to $29 million in 2025). Spalding attempted to rebuild the company with former Hogan employees who had left under Goodwin. In 2002, Spalding announced the release of the Ben Hogan Apex Tour golf ball. PGA Tour players such as Luke Donald, Bernhard Langer, and Hal Sutton signed contracts to play the ball. In January 2003, a partnership with Bettinardi Golf was created to produce Hogan-branded putters. The company also announced plans to release Hogan-branded woods and expand the range of accessories. Jim Furyk won the 2003 U.S. Open in June using Hogan clubs. That same year, Spalding (then reorganized and renamed as Top-Flite) filed for bankruptcy.

Ben Hogan Apex Tour Black golf ball from 2004.

Callaway Golf Company bought Top-Flite, which included the Strata and Ben Hogan brands, out of bankruptcy in 2003. They paid $169 million (equivalent to $296 million in 2025) to outbid Adidas-Salomon. Callaway subsequently announced that it would move the Ben Hogan manufacturing from Fort Worth to Callaway's headquarters in Carlsbad, California. Callaway's chief executive officer Chip Brewer said in 2014 regarding the acquisition of the brands: "These were not necessarily strategic mistakes, but they never bore fruit."

== Discontinuation and revivals ==
Callaway discontinued the Hogan brand in 2008 and sold the branding rights to Perry Ellis International in 2012, which resumed the sale of Hogan golf apparel, balls, and accessories. The financial terms of the deal were undisclosed. Callaway retained the rights to certain Ben Hogan trademarks, including Apex. The first set of Callaway Apex irons was released in 2014.

An attempt to resurrect Hogan-branded irons was made by Terry Koehler, a former marketing director for Hogan clubs who approached Perry Ellis to acquire the branding license in 2014. The new entity was named the Ben Hogan Golf Equipment Company. It produced irons with lofts incrementally increasing by one degree from 20 to 63 degrees, and numbered the irons by the exact loft instead of the regular 4-iron, 5-iron, 6-iron, etc. naming system. Amidst growing liabilities, it laid off much of its workforce in January 2017 and filed for chapter 11 bankruptcy a few weeks later. It re-emerged later that year as BH Golf Equipment LLC. Chief executive officer Scott White stated the company had transitioned to a direct-to-consumer model. The company again filed for chapter 11 bankruptcy in 2022, citing supply and financial difficulties related to the COVID-19 pandemic.

Simon Millington of Golf Brands Inc. purchased the branding license for Hogan clubs from Perry Ellis in 2023 and restarted the direct-to-consumer business. Millington had previously relaunched the MacGregor Golf brand.
