= Chuck Smith (Kansas politician) =

American politician

Member of the Kansas House of Representatives from the 3rd district
- Incumbent
- Assumed office January 11, 2021
- Preceded by: Monica Murnan
- In office January 12, 2015 – January 9, 2017
- Preceded by: Julie Menghini
- Succeeded by: Monica Murnan

Personal details
- Born: December 20, 1951 (age 74) Atchison, Kansas, U.S.
- Party: Republican
- Spouse: Beth Wachter
- Children: 7
- Education: Pittsburg State University
- Profession: teacher, coach

Charles Smith (born December 20, 1951) is an American politician. He has served as a Republican member for the 3rd district in the Kansas House of Representatives since 2015. He currently works as a high school football coach.
