= Top-Flite =

American golf equipment brand

- Product type: Golf equipment (balls, bags, gloves, accessories)
- Current owner: Dick's Sporting Goods
- Country: USA
- Markets: Sports equipment

Top-Flite is an American brand of sports equipment, most recognized for its golf balls, created by Spalding in the 1920s. Spalding retained the brand until 2003, when it was purchased by Callaway; Callaway sold the brand to Dick's Sporting Goods in 2012.

== History ==
Top-Flite golf ball from 2005.

Spalding's non-golf operations were acquired by the Russell Corporation in April 2003. Later that year, soon after the Top-Flite Golf Company had filed for Chapter 11 bankruptcy, Callaway Golf Company announced its intention to purchase Spalding's Top-Flite, Strata and Ben Hogan brands for around $125 million. Due to competition from Adidas, the acquisition cost Callaway $169 million. Callaway had already invested $170 million in its own plant in Carlsbad, California, this acquisition made it the second largest golf ball manufacturer at 22% of the market, behind only Acushnet, owner of Titleist.

In 2012, Callaway sold the Top-Flite brand to Dick's Sporting Goods, citing declining sales,

== Sources ==
- Stogel, Chuck (2004). "Driving to the top: with aggressive brand acquisitions, product development and strong leadership at the helm, Callaway is picking up its game". Brandweek. 45 (4): 24–28.
