= The Living World =

UK radio program

- Country of origin: United Kingdom
- Home station: BBC Radio 4
- Hosted by: Trai Anfield; Chris Sperring
- Produced by: Andrew Dawes
- Website: www.bbc.co.uk/programmes/b007qyz3

The Living World is a long-running natural history radio programme, made by the BBC and broadcast on its Radio 4. The series was created at the BBC Natural History Unit by Dilys Breese and Derek Jones, initially as a 52-week series, in 1968. It chiefly covers topics related to the flora and fauna of the British Isles, with occasional forays further afield, such as a 1997 episode on the wildlife of the Rock of Gibraltar.

For many years until 2009 the lead presenter was Lionel Kelleway. Current presenters are Trai Anfield and Chris Sperring. Other presenters include Miranda Krestovnikoff, Paul Evans Brett Westwood. and Joanna Pinnock

As of August 2010 the producer is Andrew Dawes.

In July 1968, two possible theme tunes for the programme were composed and recorded by Delia Derbyshire, but these were rejected and a piece of jazz music used instead.
