= Topgolf =

Amusement center

Topgolf International, Inc.

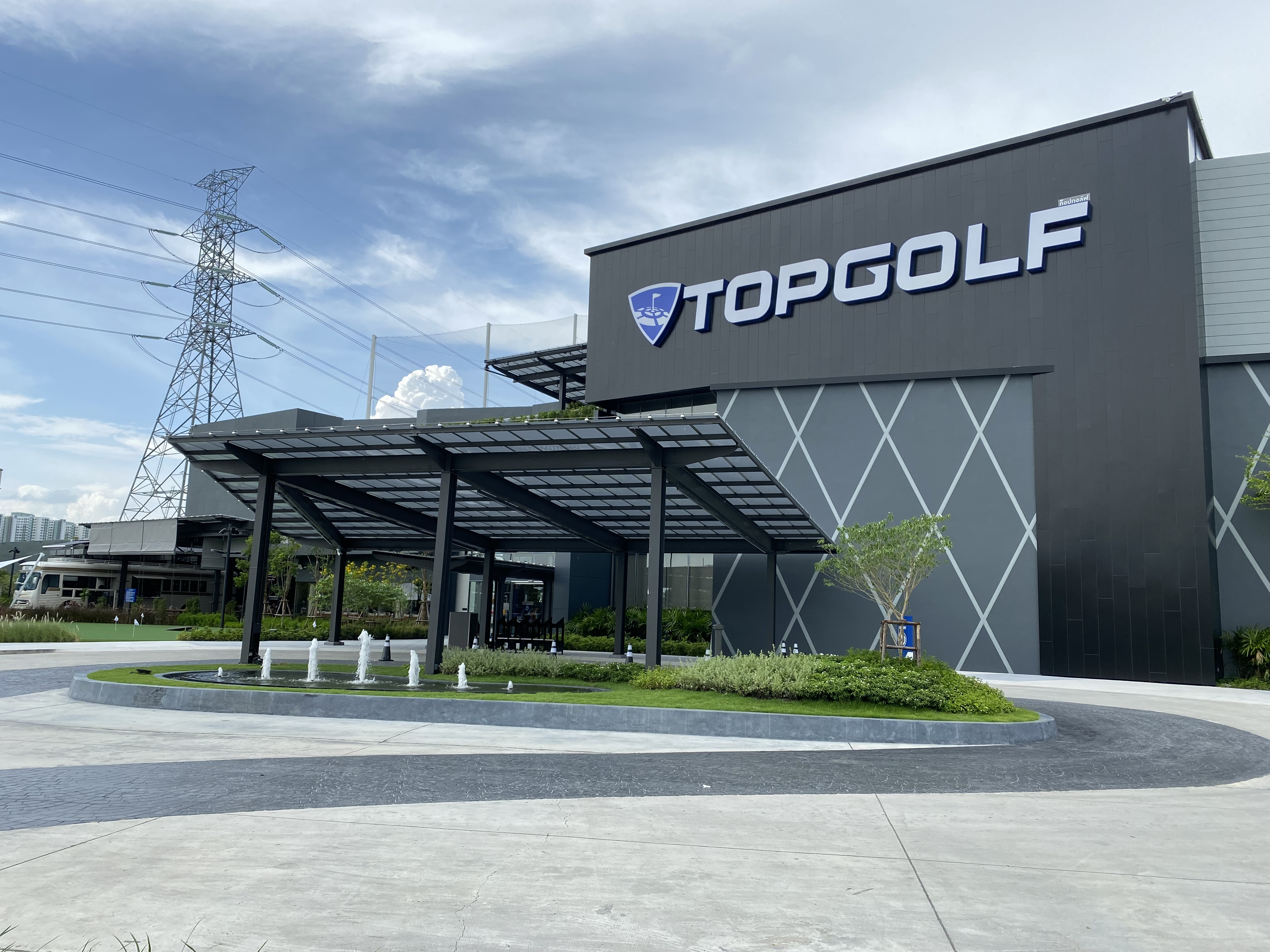
- Type: Private
- Industry: Sports entertainment
- Founded: 2000; 26 years ago in Watford, England, United Kingdom
- Founders: Steve Jolliffe; Dave Jolliffe; Mark Murray; Barry Cumbie
- Headquarters: Dallas, Texas, United States
- Number of locations: 103
- Area served: Austria; Australia; China; Germany; Mexico; Thailand; UAE; United Kingdom; United States; Indonesia
- Key people: David McKillips (CEO); Erin Chamberlin (President and Chief Operating Officer); Maryam Morse (Chief People Officer)
- Brands: Topgolf; Toptracer; Topgolf Media Networks
- Parent: Leonard Green & Partners
- Subsidiaries: Top Golf USA Inc.; Topgolf Media, LLC; Topgolf Limited
- Website: Topgolf.com

Topgolf International, Inc. is a global sports-entertainment company headquartered in Dallas, Texas, (having purchased the original Topgolf UK). It is known for its eponymous, golf-based driving range game, which includes electronically tracked golf balls and automatically scored drives. The company has locations in the United States, United Kingdom, Australia, Germany, Mexico, Thailand, and the United Arab Emirates.

Topgolf was founded in 2000 and remained independent until it was acquired by Callaway Golf in 2020. In 2024, Callaway announced an intent to undo the merger and spin off Topgolf as a second public company. In November 2025, Callaway sold a 60% majority stake to private equity funds led by Leonard Green & Partners.

== History ==
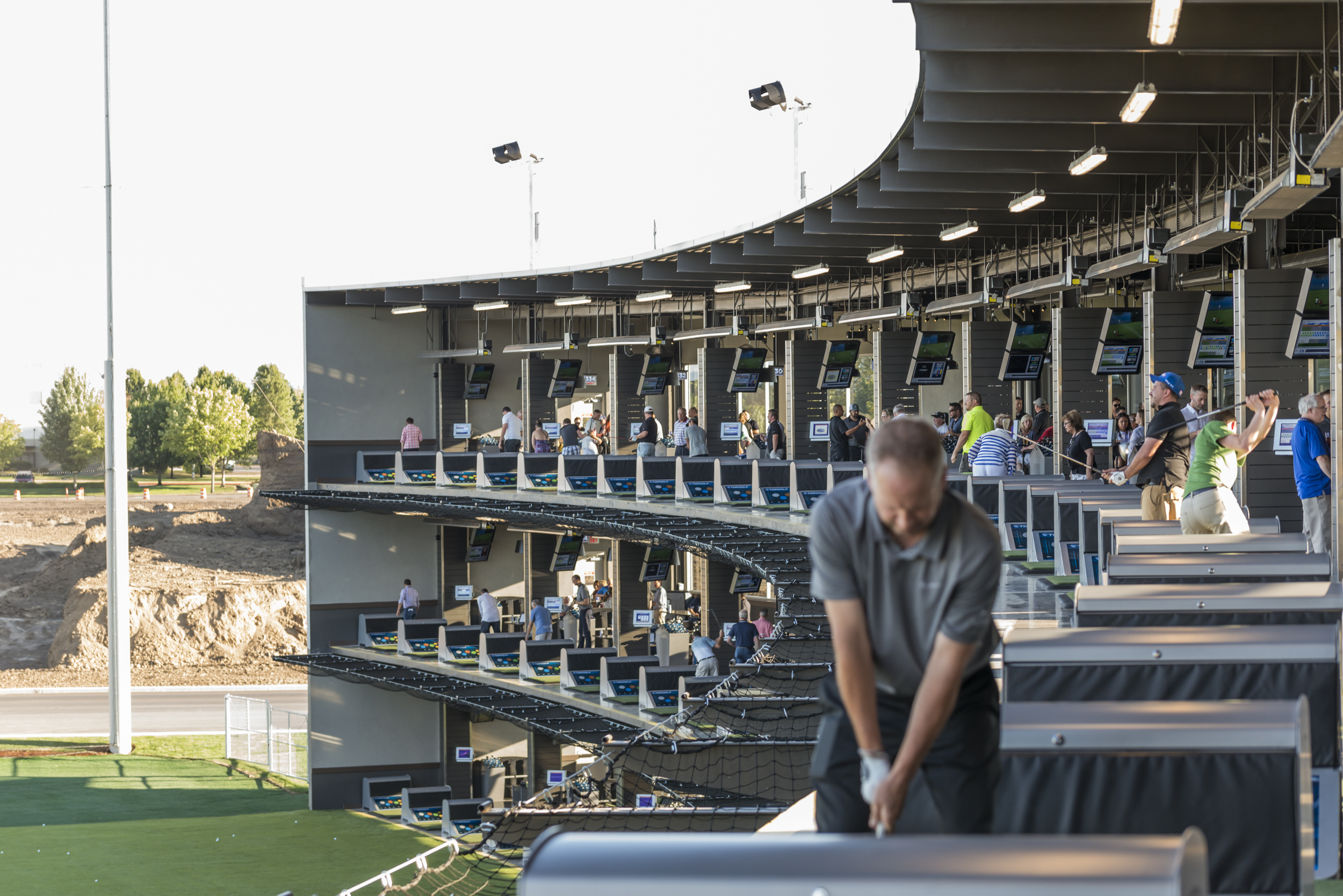
A Topgolf multi-level driving range

Twin brothers Steve and Dave Jolliffe had sold their mystery shopping business and were looking for a new project in 1997. Both golfers, they began complaining about golf's issues: the time factor and lackluster driving ranges. Looking to improve the game, the Jolliffes looked to the then-new commercial microchip technology and placed it in the golf ball. From this, they designed a new game, Topgolf, which is a redesigned driving range. In Watford, just outside London, the twins built the first location, which opened in 2000. The golfing community and businesses were not enthusiastic about the game. The PGA and golf equipment companies refused to get involved.

In 2003, bankers approached Richard Grogan to invest but were rejected. Grogan was subsequently induced to visit the Topgolf facility in February 2004. Seeing only a 5% return on investment, Grogan turned them down again, although he was otherwise impressed during the visit. Grogan with three other partners—David Main, Eric Wilkinson, Tom Mendell—then struck upon how to increase business by making it an experience by having an event space, larger kitchens, and restaurants, making locations 3 to 4 times the original's size. Grogan, Main, Wilkinson, Mendell founded and started up the US licensee, Topgolf International, and found investors. WestRiver Group was a lead investor.

Alexandria, Virginia was selected due to its close proximity to Washington, D.C., which could attract government officials from golf courses. This location opened in 2005. This location struggled so Grogan decided, although it is in a colder climate, to open a location in Chicago. Snow closed the location for its first four weeks and caused equipment damage. The next Topgolf location, Dallas, was selected for its connection to golf, a warmer environment, and Fortune 500 companies. With little traffic at any location, Grogan expected the location to be closed by May 2007. With an energetic Dallas staff in February 2007, Grogan and Main brainstormed a number of low-tech marketing techniques to draw customers as they needed to explain Topgolf like in the UK. After six months, the Dallas facility had a six-hour wait.

In 2009, Topgolf International (US) acquired Topgolf UK then in July from World Golf Systems the Topgolf intellectual property aspects. By 2011, WestRiver's head Erik Anderson took over the executive chairman post from Grogan. Anderson moved to have newer locations be even larger, with a full line kitchen and executive chefs replacing small kitchens and more golfer space. Ten locations were opened in 2013. Topgolf had sales of $163.5 million in 2014 to make the Inc. 500. Mobile phone apps were issued in 2013, with social media digital walls added to locations in 2015.

By 2015, Topgolf had 28 locations that brought in 8 million customers. In January 2016, the company purchased the World Golf Tour gaming company. Also that year, Protracer golf ball tracking technology was purchased and renamed Toptracer.

Topgolf and Village Roadshow Theme Parks agreed in 2016 to a joint venture to bring Topgolf to Australia. Village Roadshow received a 67% stake in the joint venture by providing 100% of the startup funds. On June 23, 2016, it was announced that Village Roadshow would open a venue next door to its popular theme park, Warner Bros. Movie World in Oxenford, Queensland in Australia. This was the first Topgolf venue outside the US and the UK The location opened in June 2018. Village indicated in March 2018 that they were looking for location proposals for up to eight Australia and Asia/Pacific locations. In July 2018, Village Roadshow sold $50 million in shares to fund Topgolf and for other purposes. In August 2018, Topgolf Australia reduced its stake in the joint venture from 33% to 3.7% with options to boost its share back up to 33% before December 31, 2020. Despite this action, Village Roadshow CEO Clark Kirby said the company continues to actively pursue other locations after encouraging financial results from Topgolf Australia.

In 2017, Topgolf created a new television series titled Who Will Rock You, where eight of the best unsigned bands across the country compete for $50,000 and a Topgolf tour. Season one premiered in May 2018 won by Crimson Riot female-led rock group. A second season with Matador Content and music publisher BMG was agreed upon with a March 28, 2019 start with 12 unsigned bands and a prize of $50,000 and signing with BMG. Topgolf Studios had four series available on its YouTube channel by October 2, 2019. At that time, the unit agreed with Will Smith's Westbrook Media to produce additional series with the unit for Topgolf starting with This Joka comedian documentary series.

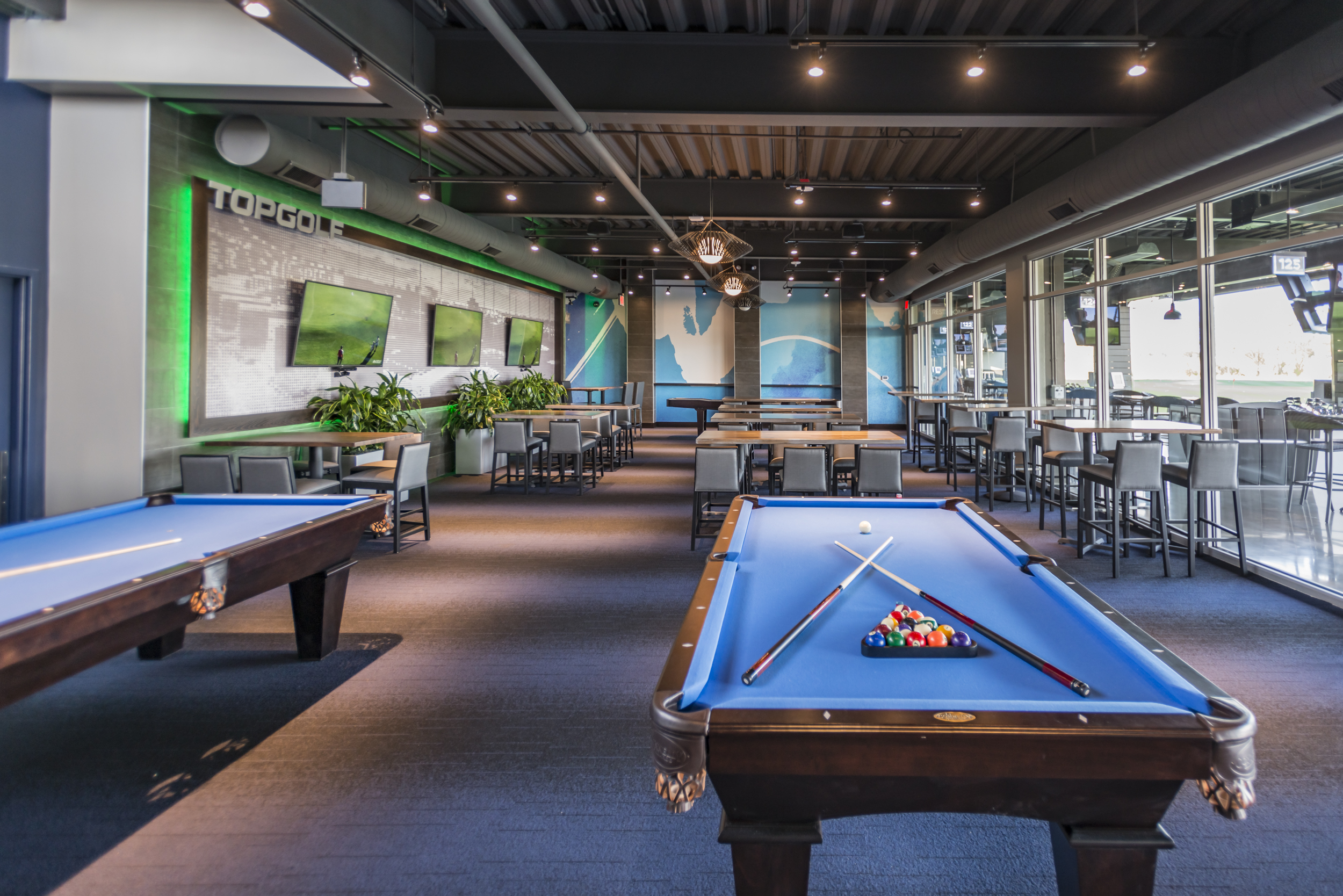
A Topgolf lounge with billiard tables

Canadian cinema company Cineplex Entertainment announced it entered a joint venture with Topgolf in July 2017 to open several Topgolf entertainment locations across Canada. However, in 2020, Topgolf and Cineplex mutually agreed to cancel the agreement due to financial pressure on Cineplex as a result of the COVID-19 pandemic.

Topgolf conducted its first temporary pop-up event in the Seattle area at T-Mobile Park in February 2017. On April 9, 2019, the company announced the first location for a new smaller version of its concept, Topgolf Lounge, in Kirkland, Washington. which opened in January 2020. On August 3, 2021, Topgolf broke ground on a new venue in Renton.

In September 2021, the U.S. Department of Labor forced Topgolf to pay 255 employees in 25 states over $750,000 in back wages for unpaid overtime. Investigators said the company was paying sales managers and event sales consultants a salary plus commission, with no overtime after a 40-hour work week. They said those employees did not meet supervisory requirements, and were eligible for overtime pay. They added that the investigation was opened after the violations were found at the company's Loudoun County, Virginia location. The Department of Labor said the company's policy violated the Fair Labor Standards Act.

=== Purchase by Callaway, private equity sale ===
On October 27, 2020, Callaway Golf Company announced it would acquire Topgolf for $2 billion. At the time, Callaway held a 14% share of Topgolf. Callaway had invested in Topgolf since 2006, with CEO Chip Brewer serving on the Topgolf board since 2012. In October 2023, Topgolf Callaway successfully completed the acquisition of its competitor, BigShots Golf, for $29 million.

On September 4, 2024, Topgolf Callaway announced plans to split back into two public companies, with the company arguing that their merger was not economically successful; Callaway would assume the merged company's debt, retain a stake in Topgolf, and continue to serve as its official equipment supplier. After exploring strategic alternatives, Callaway instead sold a 60% majority stake in Topgolf to the private equity firm Leonard Green & Partners, valuing the company at $1.1 billion

== Games ==
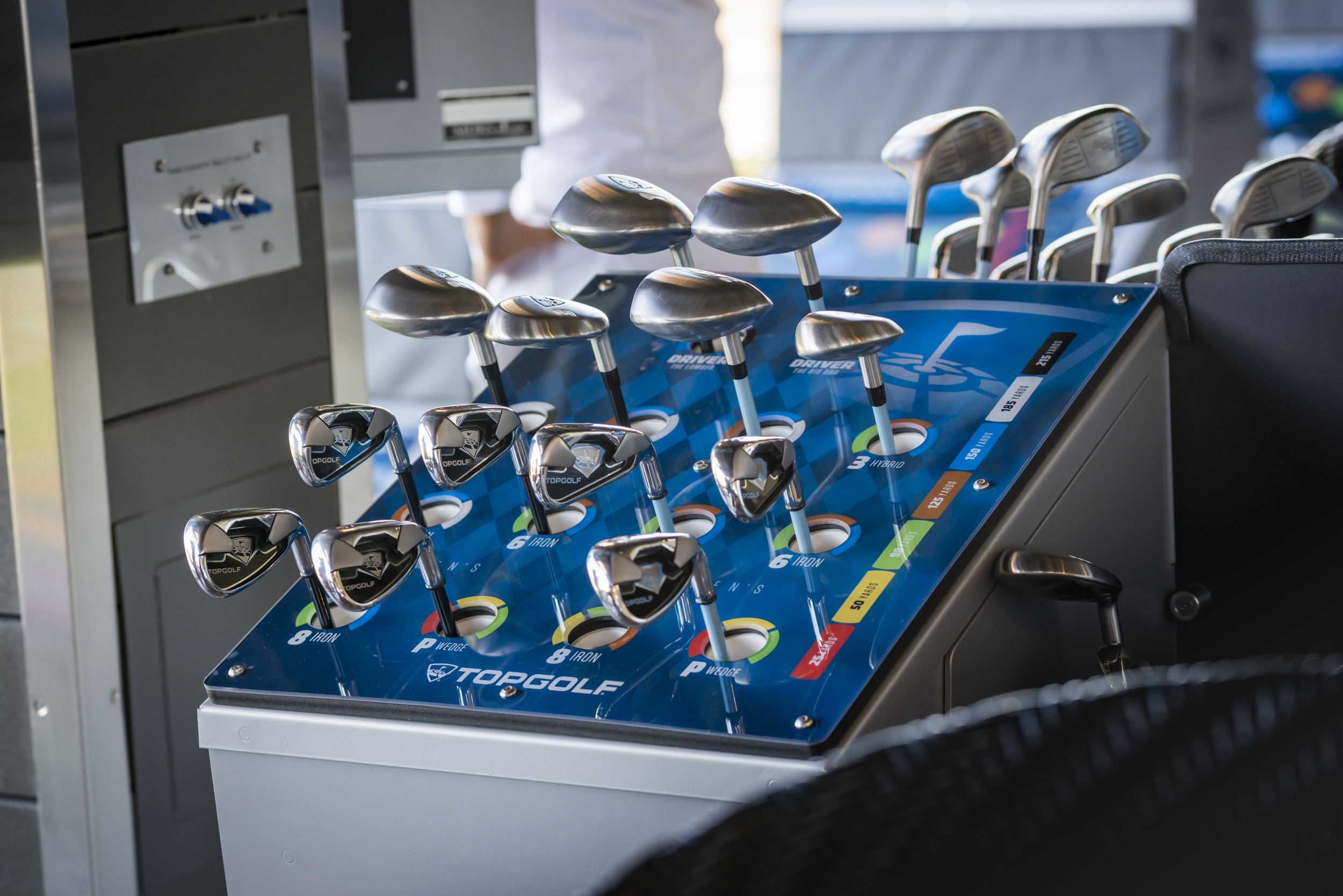
Topgolf clubs

There are multiple Topgolf game variations. The micro chipped golf balls score themselves, providing players with instant feedback on each shot's accuracy and distance.

- Topgolf – Players aim for 11 giant dartboard-like targets. The further the shot goes and the closer to the pin, the more points the player receives.
- TopChip – Use just the red target (5 shots), yellow target (5 shots) and green target (10 shots). Hit the correct target to earn points, but hit the wrong one and points are deducted.
- TopShot – Similar to TopChip. Players have to hit targets at four consecutive distances (5 shots each) Whichever starting target you choose (red, yellow, green or brown) determines the games level of difficulty,
- TopPressure – An accuracy game, in which players need to hit all nine sections within the yellow target. Move on to the second and third level to see the value of points multiply, hit the same section twice on level 2 and 3 and points will be deducted.
- Angry Birds – Angry Birds, players aim the ball to hit the Angry Birds Level on screen, this game is only available at Toptracer Locations.

== Locations ==
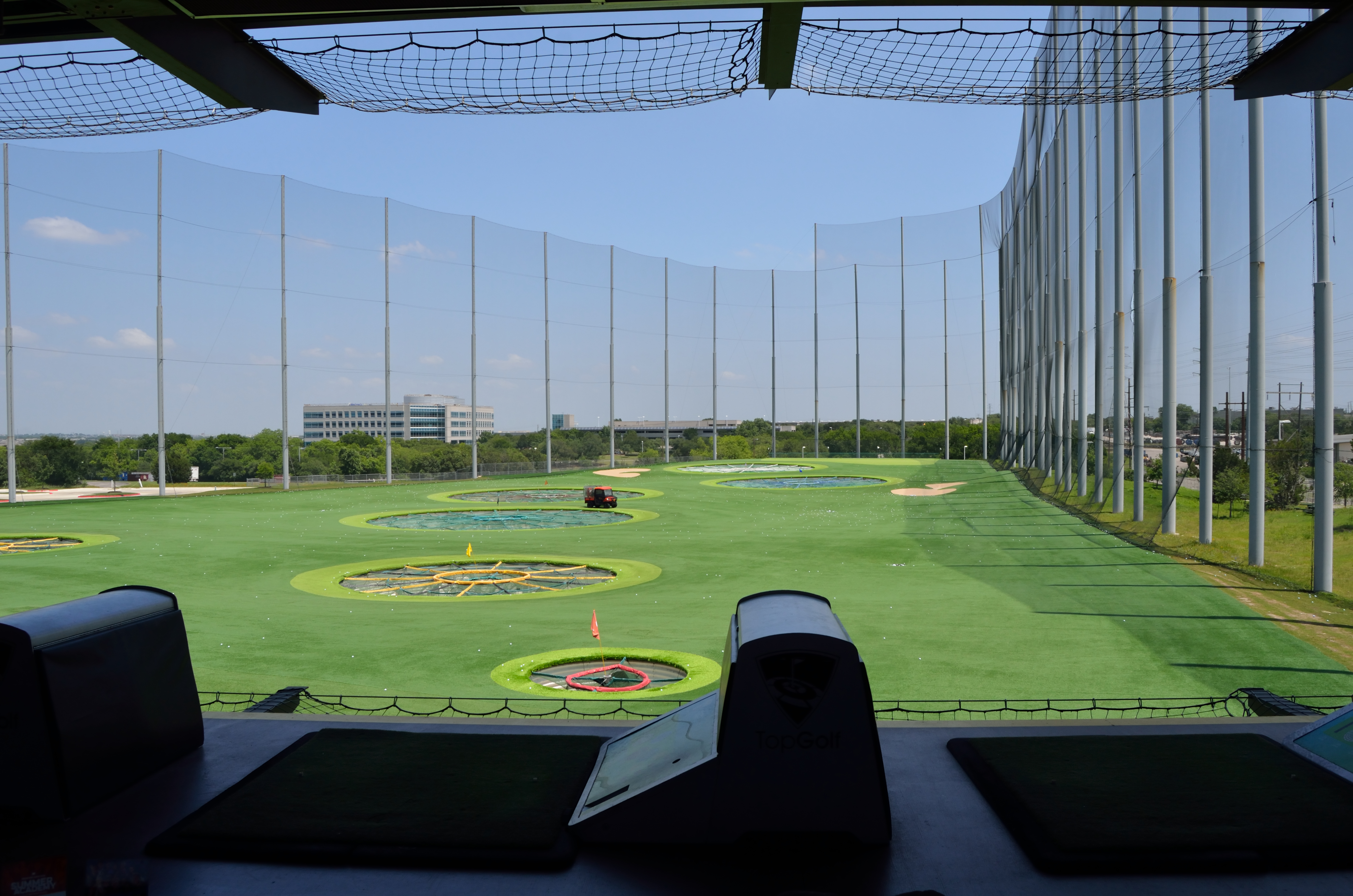
TopGolf range at Austin, Texas

As of 2026, there were over 110 Topgolf locations worldwide. Four of those were in the United Kingdom, including one in Glasgow, constructed by Luddon Construction for developer Ashfield Land at the Two 74 development in Rutherglen, which opened on 16 December 2022 as Scotland's first Topgolf location, creating 300 jobs. Other international venues include one in Australia, China, Germany, Mexico, the UAE and Thailand each. Each Topgolf venue features climate-controlled hitting bays for year-round play, food, beverage, music and HDTVs on which various sports games are shown, such as football, basketball and golf. Topgolf also offers golf lessons, leagues, tournaments, concerts, and corporate and social events.

Lounge by Topgolf, is a smaller location with a live sports restaurant, a few public hitting bays and a special events bay plus virtual game simulators. The first one opened on January 17, 2020, in Kirkland Urban second floor, Kirkland, Washington.
