= Indra Nooyi =

Indian-American business executive (born 1955)

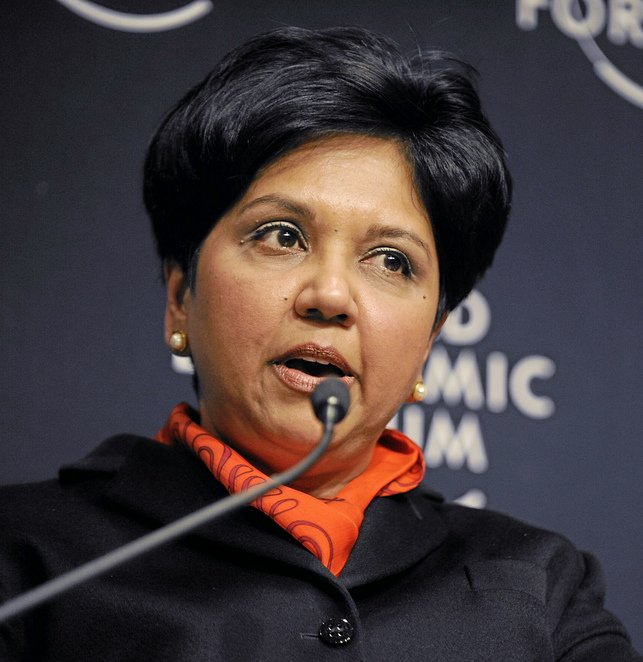
- Born: Indra Krishnamurthy; October 28, 1955 (age 70); Madras, Madras State, India (present-day Chennai, Tamil Nadu, India)
- Citizenship: United States
- Education: University of Madras (BS); Indian Institute of Management Calcutta (MBA); Yale University (MS)
- Known for: Former CEO of PepsiCo
- Spouse: Raj Nooyi (m. 1981)
- Children: 2
- Relatives: Chandrika Tandon (sister)
- Awards: Padma Bhushan (2007)
- Website: indranooyi.com

Indra Nooyi (née Krishnamurthy; born October 28, 1955) is an Indian-born American business executive who was the chairman and chief executive officer (CEO) of PepsiCo from 2006 to 2018.

Nooyi has consistently ranked among the world's 100 most powerful women. In 2014, she was ranked at number 13 on the Forbes list, and the second most powerful woman on the Fortune list in 2015 and 2017. She sits on the boards of Amazon and the International Cricket Council, among other organizations.

== Early life ==
Nooyi was born on October 28, 1955, in Madras (now known as Chennai), Tamil Nadu, India as the second of three children. Nooyi did her schooling in Holy Angels Anglo Indian Higher Secondary School in T. Nagar.

Nooyi's mother was a home maker while her father worked at the State Bank of Hyderabad. While not having a formal education herself, her mother devised strategic games at dinner for her daughters. When Nooyi and her sister were between eight and 11 years old, their mother instructed them to write a speech about what they would do if they held a position of power such as president or prime minister. If Nooyi fell short in a task, her paternal grandfather (a judge) would make her write, "I will not make excuses" 200 times on a piece of paper.

== Education ==
While completing her studies, Nooyi played guitar in a band, and excelled at cricket. Nooyi received bachelor's degrees in physics, chemistry and mathematics from Madras Christian College of the University of Madras in 1975, and a Post Graduate Programme Diploma from Indian Institute of Management Calcutta in 1976.

In 1978, Nooyi was admitted to Yale School of Management and moved to the United States, where she earned a master's degree in public and private management in 1980.

== Career ==
Nooyi began her career in India with product manager positions at Johnson & Johnson and the textile firm Beardsell Ltd. While attending Yale School of Management, Nooyi completed a summer internship with Booz Allen Hamilton. In 1980, Nooyi joined the Boston Consulting Group (BCG) as a strategy consultant, and then worked at Motorola as vice president and Director of Corporate Strategy and Planning, followed by a stint at Asea Brown Boveri.

=== PepsiCo ===
Nooyi joined PepsiCo in 1994, and was named CEO in 2006, replacing Steven Reinemund, becoming the fifth CEO in PepsiCo's 44-year history. She started as PepsiCo's senior vice president for strategic planning from 1994 until 1996, then became senior vice president for corporate strategy and development from 1996 until 2000. Next, she became senior vice president and chief financial officer of PepsiCo from February 2000 to April 2001, moving then to president and chief financial officer, beginning in 2001, and was also named to PepsiCo's board of directors.

Nooyi directed the company's global strategy for more than a decade and led PepsiCo's restructuring, including the 1997 divestiture of Tricon, now known as Yum! Brands. Tricon included companies like Pizza Hut, KFC, and Taco Bell under its umbrella. The financial gains from this spinoff allowed the company to increase the pace of its share buyback strategy, thereby giving it more leverage to pursue future acquisitions without as much shareholder backlash. Nooyi also worked on the acquisition of Tropicana in 1998, and the merger with Quaker Oats Company, which also brought Gatorade in 2001. The $3.3 billion acquisition of Tropicana initially faced opposition from other PepsiCo executives and Wall Street critics. The Quaker Oats Company's ownership of Gatorade was a lucrative move for PepsiCo, since Gatorade was responsible for 80% of sports drink sales at the time. Similar to the Tropicana acquisition, this strategic move gave PepsiCo leverage against Coca-Cola, owner of Powerade – second in the sports drink segment. PepsiCo's annual net profit rose from $2.7 billion to $6.5 billion.

Nooyi was named on Wall Street Journal's list of 50 women to watch in 2007 and 2008, and was listed among Time's 100 Most Influential People in The World in 2007 and 2008. Forbes named her the #3 most powerful woman in 2008. In 2014, she was ranked #13 by Forbes. Fortune ranked her the #1 in the list of Most Powerful Women in Business in 2009 and 2010. On October 7, 2010, Fortune magazine ranked her the 6th most powerful woman in the world. In Fortune's Most Powerful Women List of 2015, Nooyi ranked second.

Nooyi's strategic redirection of PepsiCo was called "Performance with a Purpose," focused on creating long-term growth while leaving a positive impact on society and the environment. She reclassified PepsiCo's products into three categories: "fun for you" (such as potato chips and regular soda), "better for you" (diet or low-fat versions of snacks and sodas), and "good for you" (items such as oatmeal). She moved corporate spending away from junk foods and into the healthier alternatives, with the aim of improving the healthiness of even "fun" offerings. In 2015, Nooyi removed aspartame from Diet Pepsi, although in 2016 aspartame was reintroduced due to public backlash.

Nooyi also focused on environmental concerns and sustainability, redesigning packaging to reduce waste, conserving water, switching to renewable energy sources, and recycling. She also worked on creating a culture of employee retention. As one example, Nooyi wrote to the parents of her leadership team and visited their homes to create a more personal connection.

In 2018, Nooyi stated an intent to develop a line of snacks marketed specifically for women, feeling that it was a hitherto unexplored category. In a radio interview, Nooyi stated that PepsiCo was getting ready to launch products designed and packaged as per women's preferences, and based on behavioral differences in the way men and women consume snacks.

At one point, PepsiCo even considered changing its name and move away from its namesake cola, but the health push faltered. On August 6, 2018, Nooyi stepped down as CEO, and Ramon Laguarta, a 22-year veteran of PepsiCo, replaced her on October 3, as well as becoming a member of the board of directors. However, Nooyi continued as the chair of the company until early 2019. Nooyi was CEO for 12 years, seven years longer than the average CEO tenure at large companies according to an Equilar study.

=== Connecticut public service ===
In 2019, Nooyi became the co-director of the newly created Connecticut Economic Resource Center, a public-private partnership with the Connecticut Department of Economic and Community Development. Nooyi is a resident of Connecticut and a Yale SOM classmate of Connecticut Governor Ned Lamont.

In April 2020, it was announced that Nooyi – along with Yale epidemiologist Dr. Albert Ko – would represent Connecticut on the six-state working group planning for the careful easing of COVID-19 restrictions. Nooyi and Ko also served as co-chairs of the Reopen Connecticut Advisory Group.

=== Remuneration ===
While CEO of PepsiCo in 2011, Nooyi earned $17 million, which included a base salary of $1.9 million, a cash bonus of $2.5 million, pension value and deferred remuneration of $3 million. By 2014, her total remuneration had grown to $19,087,832, including $5.5 million of equity.

In 2017, Nooyi's last full year at the helm of PepsiCo, she earned more than $31 million in total compensation. Nooyi earned $87 million between 2015 and 2017. She claims to have never asked for a pay raise while at PepsiCo.

== Awards and recognition ==
In January 2008, Nooyi was elected chairwoman of the U.S.-India Business Council (USIBC). Nooyi leads USIBC's Board of Directors, an assembly of more than 60 senior executives representing a cross-section of American industry.

In 2008, Nooyi was elected to the Fellowship of the American Academy of Arts and Sciences. She was also named one of America's Best Leaders by U.S. News & World Report.

Nooyi was named CEO of the Year by the Global Supply Chain Leaders Group in July 2009. That year, she was also Nooyi was considered one of "The TopGun CEOs" by Brendan Wood International, an advisory agency.

Fortune magazine has named Nooyi number one on its annual ranking of Most Powerful Women in business for 2006, 2007, 2008, 2009 and 2010.

Nooyi was named to Institutional Investor's Best CEOs list in the All-America Executive Team Survey in 2008 to 2011. After five years on top, PepsiCo's Indian American chairman and CEO Indra Nooyi has been pushed to the second spot as most powerful woman in US business by Kraft's CEO, Irene Rosenfeld.

She was the 2006 CNN-News18 Indian of the Year. Forbes magazine ranked Nooyi on the 2008 through 2017 lists of The World's 100 Most Powerful Women. In 2016, Nooyi was the winner of the Academy of International Business (AIB) The International Executive of the Year Award.

In February 2020, Nooyi was honored with the Outstanding Woman in Business award by the League of Women Voters of Connecticut and had been inducted into the Connecticut Women's Hall of Fame in 2015. In 2021, Nooyi was inducted into the National Women's Hall of Fame. In 2022, she was honored with Golden Book Awards. She is also a recipient of the Benjamin Franklin Medal from the Franklin Institute, the Ellis Island Medal of Honor (2017) and the Great Immigrants Award (2007).

Year	Name	Awarding organization	Ref.
2019	Honorary Doctorate of Humane Letters	Yale University	
2018	Honorary Degree	Cranfield University	
2015	Honorary Doctorate of Humane Letters	State University of New York at Purchase	
2013	Honorary Degree	North Carolina State University	
2011	Honorary Doctor of Laws	University of Warwick	
2011	Honorary Doctorate	Wake Forest University	
2011	Honorary Doctorate of Law	Miami University	
2010	Honorary Doctorate of Humane Letters	Pennsylvania State University	
2009	Honorary Degree	Duke University	
2009	Barnard Medal of Honor	Barnard College	
2008	Honorary Degree	New York University	
2007	Padma Bhushan	President of India	
2004	Honorary Doctor of Laws	Babson College	

== Memberships and associations ==
Nooyi is a Successor Fellow of the Yale Corporation. She is a member of the Foundation Board of the World Economic Forum, International Rescue Committee, Catalyst and the Lincoln Center for the Performing Arts. She is a member of the Board of Trustees of Eisenhower Fellowships, and has been chairman of the U.S.-India Business Council.

Nooyi is an honorary co-chair for the World Justice Project. From April 2015 until April 2020, she was a director of Schlumberger Limited. In June 2016, she was part of the inaugural team on the Temasek Americas Advisory Panel.

In December 2016, Nooyi joined a business forum assembled by Donald Trump to provide strategic and policy advice on economic issues.

In June 2018, Nooyi joined the International Cricket Council Board as the organization's first independent female director.

Since February 2019, Nooyi has been a member of the board of directors at Amazon.

Nooyi is the Class of 1951 Chair for the Study of Leadership at West Point, a Dean's Advisory Council member at MIT's School of Engineering, and a member of the MIT Corporation.

== Personal life ==
Indra married Raj K. Nooyi, president at AmSoft Systems, in 1981. Nooyi has two daughters and resides in Greenwich, Connecticut. She is a Hindu by faith and abstains from alcohol.

Her older sister Chandrika Krishnamurthy Tandon is a businesswoman and also a Grammy-winning artist. South Indian Carnatic musician Aruna Sairam is Indra's cousin.

In India, Nooyi used to play cricket and was also in an all-girl rock band, where she played guitar. In 2021, she published the memoir My Life in Full: Work, Family, and Our Future.

=== Philanthropy ===
In 2016, Nooyi gifted an undisclosed amount to her alma mater, the Yale School of Management. She became the school's largest alumni donor in history and the first woman to endow a deanship at a highly ranked business school with her gift.

== See also ==
- Indian Americans in the New York City metropolitan area
- List of Yale University people

Business positions
Preceded by Steven Reinemund	Chairman and CEO of PepsiCo; 2006 – Present	Succeeded by Ramon Laguarta
