= Monica Murnan =

American politician

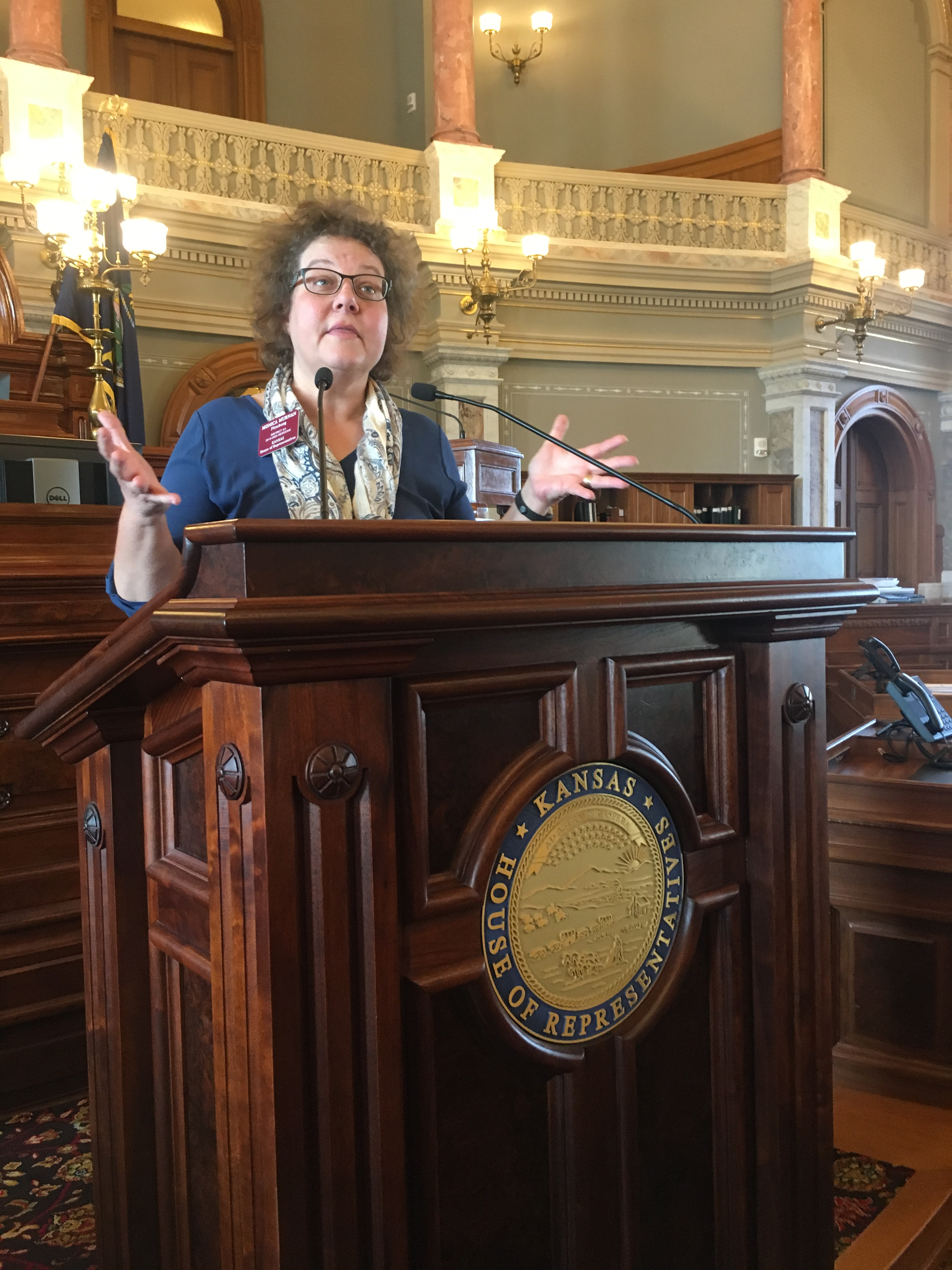

Member of the Kansas House of Representatives from the 3rd district
- In office January 9, 2017 – January 11, 2020
- Preceded by: Chuck Smith
- Succeeded by: Chuck Smith

Personal details
- Born: May 25, 1966 (age 60) Parsons, Kansas, U.S.
- Party: Democratic
- Education: Pittsburg State University (BS, MS)

Monica Murnan (born May 25, 1966) is an American politician and early childhood advocate who served as a Democratic member of the Kansas House of Representatives. Murnan represented the 3rd district, covering the city of Pittsburg, Kansas, from 2017 to 2020. She served as the Ranking Minority member on the Health and Human Services committee.

In addition to serving in the Kansas Legislature, Murnan works as the Director of the Center of Community Supports at Greenbush, an education service center that provides support to school districts across southeast Kansas.

== Professional career ==
Murnan was born in Parsons, Kansas, and raised in Erie, Kansas. After receiving a bachelor's degree in Elementary Education from Pittsburg State University in 1988, she moved to Wichita, Kansas, with her husband, Rob, to teach kindergarten and 1st grade. In 1992, she returned to Pittsburg, Kansas, to pursue a master's degree in School Administration and grow her family.

Beginning in 1995, Murnan served as the first executive director of the Family Resource Center ("The Center"). In this role, she worked to collaborate with the Pittsburg community to provide families access to a diverse set of child care services. During her time at The Center, the organization grew from 30 employees and a $300,000 budget to 100 employees and a $3 million budget. Murnan wrote grant applications, managed staff, and led the effort to acquire a new facility. In 2013, Murnan accepted a position as the Director of Student Support Services with Greenbush Southeast Kansas Education Service, where she helped to provide in-home services to infants with disabilities, coordinates Medicaid billing for over 1/3 of the school districts in the state, and provides professional development to teachers and administrators. In December 2020, Murnan became the Director of the newly formed Center of Community Supports at Greenbush. The Center of Community Supports acts as a focal point of communication and connection to a broad range of services that help with early learning, healthcare, behavioral health, research & evaluation, and more.

== Political career ==
=== Pittsburg City Commission ===
In 2013, Murnan successfully ran for one of three at-large seats on the Pittsburg City Commission, receiving the most votes of any candidate in the race. As Commissioner, Murnan supported the passage of bonds to fund utility construction for a new state-owned casino in Pittsburg, voted to invest city funds toward the construction of a new track-and-field center at Pittsburg State University, and approved plans to expand parts of Atkinson Municipal Airport. Murnan also criticized then-Governor Sam Brownback's budget decision to delay the planned expansion of a dangerous two-lane stretch of US-69 highway, stating the citizens of Pittsburg "have repeatedly been told this project was going to happen. It's a huge blow to us, we’ve been waiting patiently."

=== Kansas House of Representatives ===
In 2016, Murnan filed to run as a Democrat for the Kansas House of Representatives' 3rd district seat against the Republican incumbent, Representative Chuck Smith, citing that she "felt the state was in a dire circumstance, near bankruptcy and did not resemble the state she remember[ed] growing up in." The district was a high-priority target for Kansas Democrats, as Smith had won the swing district from its previous Democratic occupant Julie Menghini by just 114 votes in 2014. Campaigning against unpopular Governor Sam Brownback and Smith's votes in support of his agenda, Murnan emerged victorious by a four-point margin. She was re-elected by a 10-point margin in 2018. Murnan was narrowly defeated in a 2020 rematch with Smith.

During the 2018 Kansas gubernatorial election, Murnan endorsed the eventual nominee, State Senator Laura Kelly, in the Democratic primary. Kelly would go on to defeat Republican Kris Kobach and Independent Greg Orman in the general election, becoming the 48th Governor of Kansas.

Murnan spoke at the 2019 Women's March in Pittsburg on January 19.

==== 2019–2020 committee membership ====
- Health and Human Services
- Rural Revitalization
- Social Services Budget
- Joint Committee on Home and Community Based Services

=== Elections ===
2020 Kansas House of Representatives 3rd district election
Party	Candidate	Votes	%
Republican	Chuck Smith	4,942	53.9
Democratic	Monica Murnan (incumbent)	4,213	46.0
Total votes		9,165	100.0
Republican gain from Democratic			

2018 Kansas House of Representatives 3rd district election
Party	Candidate	Votes	%
Democratic	Monica Murnan (incumbent)	3,906	54.8
Republican	Terry Calloway	3,223	45.2
Total votes		7,129	100.0
Democratic hold			

2016 Kansas House of Representatives 3rd district election
Party	Candidate	Votes	%
Democratic	Monica Murnan	4,351	52.5
Republican	Chuck Smith (incumbent)	3,939	47.5
Total votes		8,290	100.0
Democratic gain from Republican			

2013 Pittsburg City Commission at-large district election
Party	Candidate	Votes	%
Nonpartisan	Monica Murnan	869	17.7
Nonpartisan	Chuck Munsell	734	15.0
Nonpartisan	Michael Gray	732	14.9
Nonpartisan politician	Dave Holloman	716	14.6
Nonpartisan politician	Ralph McGeorge	701	14.3
Nonpartisan politician	Cheryl Mayo	497	10.1
Nonpartisan politician	Leatha Bolinger	439	9.0
Nonpartisan politician	William Wilper	193	3.9
Total votes		4,899	100.0
