= Custom wheel =

Modified vehicle wheels

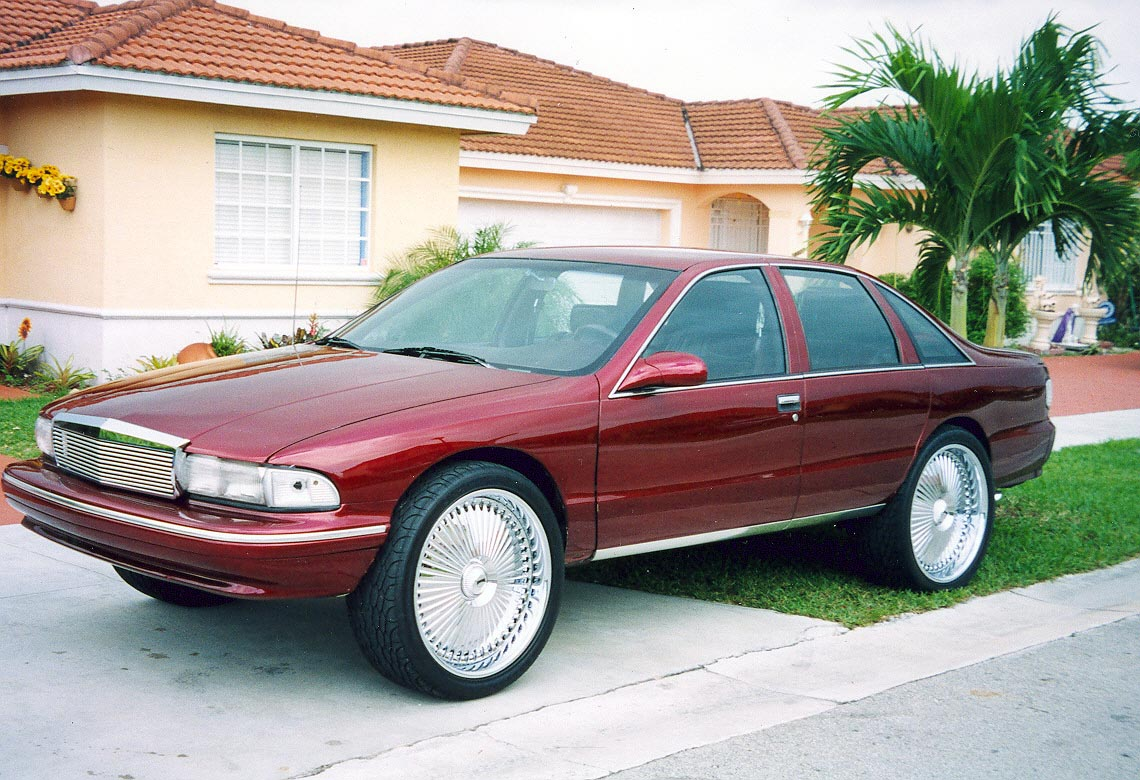
A customized 1991-1994 Chevrolet Caprice with oversized wheels.

The term custom wheel refers to the wheels of a vehicle which have either been modified from the vehicle manufacturer's standard or have replaced the manufacturer's standard.

== Uses ==
Custom wheels are one of the most common ways in which automobile owners customize their vehicles. Competition-oriented enthusiasts typically switch to lighter, stronger, or larger wheels, while appearance-oriented enthusiasts more often choose larger and more visually distinctive wheels.

The most-desirable characteristics of custom wheels vary with owner's goals:

Activity	Primary characteristics considered
Automobile racing	Weight
Drag racing	Width (for traction)
Rally	Strength
Street driving	Visual appeal, weight (gas mileage)
Touring car racing and autocrossing	Weight, width (less tire flex for better cornering performance)
Multi-purpose	Strength, visual appeal, weight, width, achieved by maintaining multiple sets of wheels

== Popularity ==
According to SEMA, custom wheels are increasing in popularity year after year. Nearly one-third of all new-vehicle buyers customize their vehicles with custom wheels. Custom wheel spinners for custom wheels then came about in the late 1990s and got popular in the new millennium. The popularity has even grown further by the introduction of larger wheel and spinner diameters such as 18" / 20" / 22" / 24" / 26" and even up to 30" inch wheels diameters.

== Custom wheel spinners ==
Custom wheel spinners also known as "Tru-Spinners" and "free-spinning spinners" were a decorative kinetic attachment to the center of the wheel of an automobile that would continue to rotate after the wheel had stopped. Many were normal sized to the center of the wheel and then some were enlarged spinners as the wheel market experienced a demand for larger and larger diameter wheels and spinners. Some would also cover the entire wheel rim on some applications, hence the name "spinner rims". They operated when the automobile wheel stopped rotating the Tru-Spinners would continue to stay in motion spinning. Then once Tru-Spinners had stopped spinning and were in a stationary position, they would not start to spin again until the wheel started rotating and again picking up momentum from the rotating wheel itself. They were designed to independently rotate and spin by using one or more roller bearings to isolate the spinner from the wheel, enabling it to spin while the wheel is at rest. In the early stages of the invention during the mid-1990s, the Tru-Spinners invention was only used on custom cars and on show cars in competitions which continued on into the 2000s. The spinner wheels were invented by American inventor James J.D. Gragg of the United States who was awarded spinner patent, United States Patent #5,290,094 on March 4, 1994, with foreign patents to follow.

Later at the turn of the new millennium the popularity grew worldwide and other patents were issued within the United States. On April 29, 2003, David Fowlkes was issued a United States patent for a free-spinning spinner wheel patent #6,554,370. When Fowlkes could not get a booth at the Los Angeles Car Show, he asked Latrell Sprewell to allow him to showcase them there in his booth. This is where many people started to mistakenly believe that Latrell Sprewell, professional NBA basketball player, had invented them and so went the nickname in the rap music community calling them "Sprewells" as some rap music even included nickname in the lyrics of rap songs.

== Finishes ==
Custom wheels come in many different finishes. The most common custom wheel finishes are Chrome, Polished and Painted. Chrome wheels consist of traditional chrome plating as well as the new process of PVD (Physical Vapor Deposition) Chrome. PVD chrome wheels are protected with a clear coat and are now being introduced by several wheel companies. Polished wheels are simply aluminum wheels that have been polished to a shine. Polished wheels may or may not be protected by a clear coat. Polished wheels that do not have a clear coat are prone to oxidation and may require periodic polishing to maintain its finish. Painted wheels come in many different colors and may also have a machined surface incorporated into it. Silver and black painted wheels are the most common painted finishes. Painted wheels are protected with a clear coat.

== Physics ==
At some point, the performance advantage of larger wheels and reduced-profile tires meets the performance disadvantage of increased inertia and increased unsprung weight. This point varies depending on the vehicle, style of wheel, and driving style; however, most vehicles do not see a performance increase when rims are more than two sizes larger than original-equipment specifications. Appearance-oriented enthusiasts may feel that decreased performance and an increased risk of road damage from the use of oversized rims is a worthwhile price to pay for the look they want.

== Weight ==
Enkei RPF1 wheel on a Honda S2000

Beyond aesthetic reasons, some consumers, along with racing professionals and motorsports hobbyists, customize their wheels primarily for the purpose of weight reduction. Reducing the weight of the wheels reduces unsprung mass and rotational inertia, which can improve acceleration, handling, braking and other performance characteristics. True-forged wheels are up to 30% lighter than regular/standard OEM cast wheels. An additional 20% in weight can be saved by upgrading to forged magnesium wheels, such as those employed by F1 and MotoGP teams. Many owners who employ magnesium wheels confirm improved handling, especially during turns, as well as tangible lap-time reduction on a circuit. Some companies also offer lightweight wheels made from carbon fiber reinforced polymer (CFRP).

== Theft ==
Since aftermarket rims may be worth thousands of dollars, owners sometimes use special lug nuts, called wheel locks, to secure them. There is some evidence that wheel locks deter criminals, though the evidence is mixed when it comes to how well they thwart determined thieves, and it may make the vehicle more difficult to service.

== See also ==
- Dub (wheel)
- DUB Magazine
- Alloy wheel
