= Julie Menghini =

American politician

Representative Julie Menghini

Member of the Kansas House of Representatives from the 3rd district
- In office January 14, 2013 – January 12, 2015
- Preceded by: Terry Calloway
- Succeeded by: Chuck Smith
- In office January 10, 2005 – January 10, 2011
- Preceded by: R. J. Wilson
- Succeeded by: Terry Calloway

Personal details
- Born: April 18, 1964 (age 62) Pittsburg, Kansas, U.S.
- Party: Democratic
- Spouse: Henry Menghini
- Children: 3
- Education: Pittsburg State University; University of Kansas

Julie Menghini (born April 18, 1964) is a former Democratic House Minority Whip of the Kansas House of Representatives, who represented the 3rd district from 2005 to 2011, and again from 2013-2015. She served on the Joint Committee on Kansas Security, Elections and Transportation Committees as well as the House Taxation Committee, where she was the ranking minority member. Menghini ran for re-election in 2010, but was defeated by Republican Terry Calloway by a margin of less than 200 votes.

Menghini serves as a board member of Elm Acres Youth and Family Services, and a member of the PTO, Business Education Alliance committee for the Pittsburg Area Chamber of Commerce and USD 250. She also serves on the board of directors for the Alliance for Technology Commercialization.

She lives in Pittsburg and is married to Henry Menghini. They have three children - Aria, Connor, and Dante.
