= DeVerne Lee Calloway =

Former American politician

Member of the Missouri House of Representatives from the St. Louis City-13th, 70th, 81st district
- In office 1962–1980

Personal details
- Born: June 17, 1916 Memphis, Tennessee
- Died: January 23, 1993 (aged 76)
- Party: Democratic
- Spouse: Ernest A. Calloway
- Occupation: politician

DeVerne Lee Calloway (June 17, 1916 – January 23, 1993) was an American politician who was the first black woman to serve in the Missouri state legislature. She served as a Missouri state representative. Calloway was educated at the Seventh Day Adventist Grammar School, LeMoyne College in Memphis, Atlanta University, Northwestern University, Pioneer Business Institute in Philadelphia, and Pendle Hill, a Quaker School in Wallingford, Pennsylvania. She was married to Ernest A. Calloway, a longtime Teamster organizer who died three years before she did. She and her husband published the Citizen Crusader which was later named the New Citizen. This newspaper covered black politics and civil rights in St. Louis.

The DeVerne Lee Calloway Award named after her recognizes outstanding female leaders in Missouri.
