= James C. Calaway =

- Born: June 22, 1931
- Died: December 12, 2018 (aged 87); Carbondale, Colorado
- Occupation: Chairman of Edge Petroleum
- Known for: Chairman of Edge Petroleum; Philanthropic work; Member of the Aspen Institute Board of Trustees and National Petroleum Council
- Board member of: CMC Foundation Board; CMC Board of Overseers; Aspen Institute Board of Trustees
- Spouse: Connie Calaway

James C. Calaway was a philanthropist-businessman who resided in Carbondale, Colorado. He was the son of poor tenant farmers in Texas and was the first in his family to ever attend college. He served as the Chair of the Aspen Institutes Society of Fellows before he became a trustee in 1997. In 2000 he was selected as an Honorary Trustee, and later appointed to the Council of Honorary Trustees after its creation. Calaway was in the oil and gas exploration business for over 40 years and retired as Chairman of Edge Petroleum in the late 1980s. He partnered with his son in building wind farms in several states to generate renewable energy.

In addition, following his retirement, Calaway had sights on philanthropy and fundraising for civic groups and non-profit organizations, having served as a regent of the University of Corpus Christi, a trustee of Antioch College, and a board member of the Colorado Mountain College Foundation. He served as Treasurer for the American Civil Liberties Union on the national level and was a lifetime member of the NAACP. Moreover, he co-founded Colorado Animal Rescue, a non-profit animal shelter that has taken in, cared for and adopted out over 17,000 homeless dogs and cats. Calaway received two presidential appointments during Jimmy Carter's presidential administration to the National Petroleum Council and as Commissioner of Presidential Scholars.

== Move to Colorado and philanthropy ==
Calaway was introduced to the Aspen Institute in the early 1970s, which first brought him to the Colorado mountains. He and his wife Connie lived in the Carbondale area from 1993, after he retired from the helm of Edge Petroleum. His giving to the community was extensive, and his name is on the Calaway Academic Building at the Colorado Mountain College Spring Valley campus and the Calaway Young Cancer Center at Valley View Hospital. He was the primary funder and a co-founder of Colorado Animal Rescue (CARE), the animal shelter across from the Spring Valley campus. He was also one of the founders of the Thunder River Theatre Company in Carbondale and gave to the Third Street Center, Habitat for Humanity, the Sopris Sun, Valley View Hospital and the KIPP Foundation, among many other local organizations. He described scholarships as a pillar of his charitable giving, and he helped put together an alliance between Colorado Mountain College and the Aspen Institute.

Alpine Bank founder Bob Young, himself a chief philanthropist in the Carbondale area, became a friend, and Connie Calaway's involvement with the Colorado Mountain College board led to the couple's partnership with Colorado Animal Rescue.

== Death and legacy ==
Calaway died on 12 December 2018, at the age of 87, at his home at River Valley Ranch in Carbondale. A community giving program, the "Calaway Give-Back", was launched in his memory in early 2019, directing donations to organizations he supported, among them the American Civil Liberties Union of Colorado, the Aspen Institute, Colorado Animal Rescue, the Colorado Mountain College Foundation, Garfield County Libraries and Habitat for Humanity.
