= Kate Calloway =

American author of crime fiction

Kate Calloway (born 1957) is an American author of lesbian crime fiction. Her stories feature a lesbian detective, Cassidy James. Danika Ellis of Lesbrary described the first novel in the series as "cozy crime fiction" because of its emphasis on small town community and food, and the protagonist's financial security.

== Works ==
- First Impressions, 1996
- Second Fiddle, 1997
- Third Degree, 1997
- Fourth Down, 1997
- Fifth Wheel, 1998
- Sixth Sense, 1999
- Seventh Heaven, 1999
- Eighth Day, 2001
