= Callaway (surname) =

Callaway is a surname. Notable people with the surname include:

- Ann Hampton Callaway (born 1958), American singer, songwriter, and actress
- Antonio Callaway (born 1997), American football player
- Catherine Callaway (fl. 1990s–2010s), news anchor
- Charles Callaway (1838–1915), geologist
- Dean Callaway (born 1970), Australian rugby league footballer
- Edward Callaway (born 1962), American neuroscientist
- Ely Callaway Jr. (1919–2001), American businessman best known as founder of Callaway Golf
- Emily Callaway (fl.2022), American politician
- Enoch Callaway (1924–2014), American psychiatrist
- Francis Oscar Callaway (1872–1947), former US Representative (D-TX)
- Frank Callaway (1919–2003), Australian music educator
- Fuller Earle Callaway (1870–1928), businessman and former president of the American Cotton Manufacturers Association
- Henry Callaway (1817–1890), bishop of the Anglican Church
- Howard "Bo" Callaway (1927–2014), former U.S. Representative (R-GA) and Secretary of the Army
- Llewellyn L. Callaway (1868–1951), chief justice of the Montana Supreme Court
- Liz Callaway (born 1961), American actress and singer
- James Callaway (1783–1815), grandson of Daniel Boone
- James E. Callaway, American politician
- Marquez Callaway (born 1998), American football player
- Maud Callaway (b. 1906), American clubwoman and genealogist
- Mickey Callaway, professional baseball player
- Mark William Callaway, WWE star The undertaker
- Nicholas Callaway, founder and CEO of Callaway Arts & Entertainment
- Norman Callaway, Australian cricketer
- Phil Callaway, Christian humorist
- Reeves Callaway, founder of Callaway Cars Incorporated
- Ragan Callaway, plant and community ecologist
- Richard Callaway, early settler of Kentucky
- Richard Callaway, cricket umpire
- Rose Callaway, fictional character in Invasion
- Samuel R. Callaway, American railroad executive
- Sydney Callaway, Australian cricketer
- Thomas Callaway (born 1974), also known as CeeLo Green, American singer
