= Calloway School of Business and Accountancy =

Undergraduate business school of Wake Forest University

Coordinates: 36.1312°N 80.2773°W

The Calloway School of Business and Accountancy
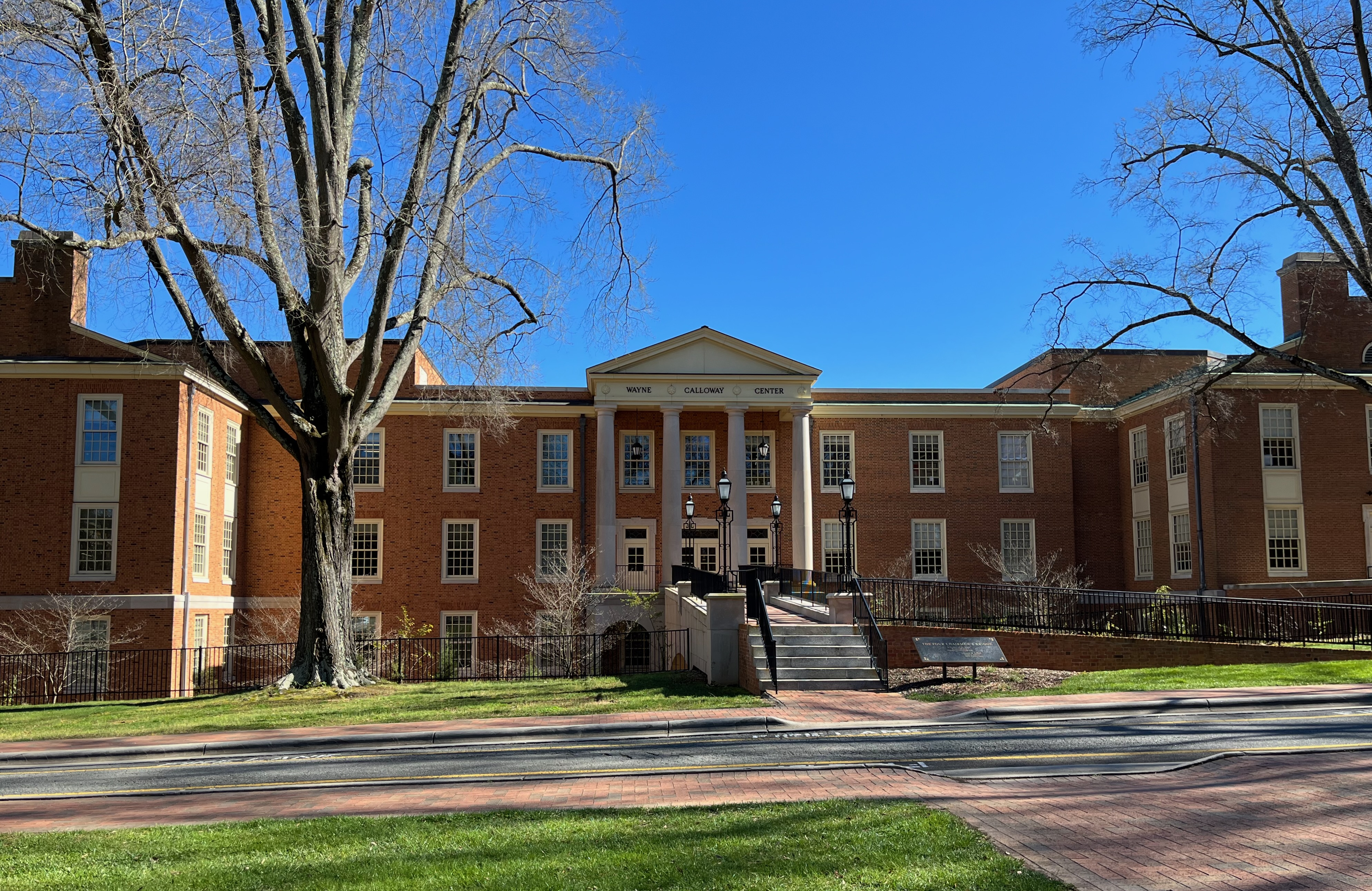
- The building in 2023
- Type: Private
- Established: 1969 (57 years ago)
- Parent institution: Wake Forest University
- Dean: Steven Reinemund
- Students: 470
- Location: Winston-Salem, North Carolina, U.S.
- Campus: Suburban
- Website: www.calloway.wfu.edu

The Calloway School of Business and Accountancy is the undergraduate business school of Wake Forest University. It is named after Wayne Calloway, who was the Chairman and former CEO of PepsiCo, Inc. In the 2012 BusinessWeek Undergraduate Business Schools Rankings, the Calloway School of Business and Accountancy is ranked 1st in the Academic Quality and Hardest Working categories, and 19th overall. The Wayne Calloway Center, in which the School of Business and Accountancy is housed, was formerly known as Babcock Hall.

The school's stated mission is: To enhance business and society, through our teaching and scholarship.

== History ==
The Wake Forest School of Business Administration was founded in 1949 by Professor Gaines M. Rogers, with seven or eight full-time faculty, and offering two degrees: B.S and B.B.A. In 1968 Rogers resigned as dean of the school, and was replaced by Harvard finance professor Robert S. Carlson, who instituted the school's first MBA program. In 1970, the school was transformed into a department within the college, and in doing so lost its AACSB accreditation. In 1980 the department was again reorganized into the School of Business and Accountancy with Thomas C. Taylor as dean. Subsequently, the school was re-accredited in 1985. Beginning in 1994, the school began to offer two new programs: a Master of Science in Accountancy, and a B.S. in Analytical Finance. In 1995, the school was renamed the Wayne Calloway School of Business and Accountancy, after former graduate and CEO of PepsiCo Inc. Wayne Calloway, who had been a long-standing friend of the university. In 2003, the school relocated to its current home in F.M. Kirby hall in the Wayne Calloway Center.

Steven Reinemund was announced at the new dean of the combined Calloway and Babcock Schools on April 22, 2008. He is the former CEO and chairman of PepsiCo and current board member of numerous Fortune 100 companies.

== Academics ==
The school has 31 full-time faculty teaching 492 students. The average class size is 24 students, with student to faculty ratio of 14:1. The school currently offers four degrees: Business, Finance, Mathematical Business, and Accountancy. The accounting degree is a five-year program which confers a Master of Science in Accountancy, with graduates taking their CPA exam concurrent with graduation. The school also offers a concentration in Enterprise Risk Management, under the direction of Merrill Lynch Associate Professor Jonathan Duchac. In addition, three interdisciplinary minors are offered: Entrepreneurship and Social Enterprise, Global Trade and Commerce, and International Studies. During the summer months, Calloway has an intensive six week Summer Management Course, which is designed for non-business majors, and aims to instill the basics of the modern business world. According to the school, "This program offers a mix of seminars, case studies, and lectures in ten fields: accounting, finance, marketing, organizational behavior, management, information systems, business law, operations, strategic management, and entrepreneurship".

== Rankings ==
In the 2012 BusinessWeek Undergraduate Business Schools Rankings, the Calloway School of Business and Accountancy is ranked 1st for Academic Quality and 19th overall. BusinessWeek also ranked the Calloway School of Business and Accountancy as 1st in the Hardest Working Ranking based on hours per week on classwork.
