= Terry Calloway =

American politician (born 1954)

Member of the Kansas House of Representatives from the 3rd district
- In office January 10, 2011 – January 14, 2013
- Preceded by: Julie Menghini
- Succeeded by: Julie Menghini

Personal details
- Born: August 6, 1954 (age 71)
- Party: Republican
- Spouse: Denise Calloway
- Education: Greenville Technical College; Pittsburg State University

Terry Calloway (born August 6, 1954) is former a Republican member of the Kansas House of Representatives, representing the 3rd district (Pittsburg) from 2011 to 2013. Calloway was first elected to office in 2010, where he defeated the incumbent Julie Menghini.

Calloway was raised in Greenville, South Carolina. He attended Greenville Technical College and was a draftsman working in mechanical engineering related fields. He later moved to Pittsburg, Kansas and attended Pittsburg State University earning a bachelor's degree in computer science in 1988. That year he established Data Technique, a computer software and consulting firm. He is a Baptist.

Calloway is anti-abortion, and has been a co-sponsor of bills to limit late-term abortions, including the intact dilation and extraction procedure. He is a member of the American Majority.

On June 11, 2012, Calloway announced he would withdraw from the 2012 election.
