= Callaway Golf Company =

American consumer products company

- Formerly: Callaway Golf Company (1982–2022); Topgolf Callaway Brands Corp. (2022–2026)
- Type: Public
- Traded as: NYSE: CALY; S&P 600 component
- ISIN: US1311931042
- Industry: Sports equipment, textile
- Founded: 1982; 44 years ago
- Founder: Ely Callaway Jr.
- Headquarters: Carlsbad, California, U.S.
- Area served: Worldwide
- Key people: Chip Brewer (CEO)
- Products: Golf Equipment; Active Lifestyle
- Revenue: US$2.060 billion (2025)
- Operating income: US$128.1 million (2025)
- Net income: ▼US$409.3 million (2025)
- Total assets: US$7.286 billion (2025)
- Total equity: US$2.069 billion (2025)
- Subsidiaries: Callaway Golf; TravisMathew; Odyssey; OGIO
- Website: callawaygolf.com

Callaway Golf Company is an American global sports equipment manufacturing company that designs, manufactures, markets and sells golf equipment, more specifically clubs and balls, also including accessories such as bags, gloves, and caps.

The company sells its products through golf retailers and sporting goods retailers, through mass merchants, directly online, and through its pre-owned and trade-in services. Callaway markets its products in more than 70 countries worldwide. The company, based in Carlsbad, California, is the world's largest manufacturer of golf clubs. In 2021, the company purchased Topgolf, a chain of entertainment-oriented driving ranges; in 2025, Callaway sold a majority stake in Topgolf to private equity.

In past years, Callaway marketed products under the "Toulon Design" and "Odyssey" putter brands, acquired in 1997, as well as "Top-Flite", "Strata", and "Ben Hogan" brands picked up following the bankruptcy of Spalding's former golf division in 2003.

== History ==
Topgolf brand logo

Callaway Golf Company was founded by former Burlington Industries textile president, Ely Callaway Jr. in 1982. Callaway was raised in LaGrange, Georgia, and was a graduate of Emory University. He had previously been successful in the textile and wine industries, and was also an avid golfer. Among his favorite club brands was Hickory Sticks USA, which was known for producing clubs with hickory shafts and steel cores. At that time, Hickory Sticks was owned by Richard Parente, Dick De La Cruz, and Tony Manzoni. When Hickory Sticks started running low on funds, they began seeking investors and approached Callaway, who had just sold his vineyards for a $9 million profit. In 1982, he bought half of Hickory Sticks USA and the company was renamed "Callaway Hickory Stick USA." In 1983, he became the company's president and moved its headquarters to Carlsbad, California where he could be found selling clubs out of his Cadillac. In 1984, Callaway bought the rest of the company for another $400,000. The company's name was changed to its present name in 1988.

In 1985, the company hired Bruce Parker as head of sales, who later became the company's Chief Merchant and, through his tenure with Callaway Golf as head of sales, was responsible for sales in excess of $3.0 billion. He was involved in all major decisions during the company's growth.

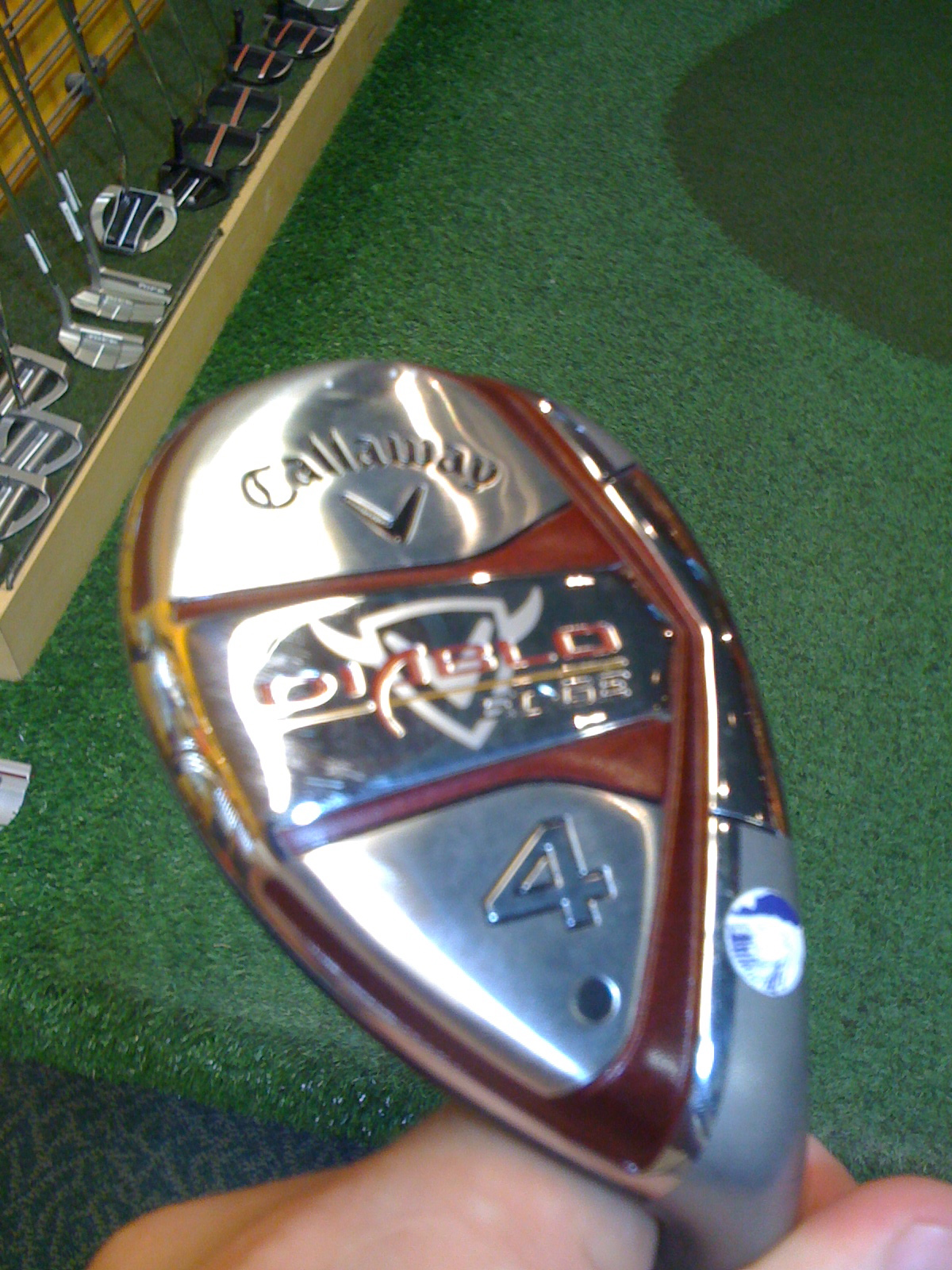
Golf club made by Callaway

In 1986, Callaway hired a billiard cue designer, Richard C. Helmstetter, as a consultant. Helmstetter was named chief club designer that same year and introduced computer-controlled manufacturing machines. With his help and that of Glenn Schmidt, the company's master tool maker, the company developed the original Big Bertha driver using large-volume (190cc) steel clubhead. The Big Bertha driver grew to 290 cc in 1997 and grew to be popular in play due to the larger clubhead size increasing the driver's moment of inertia and thus its forgiveness.

In 1996, the company hired Roger Cleveland as chief club designer and in 2002, launched the Callaway Golf Forged Wedges, constructed from carbon steel with modified U-grooved faces.

In 1996, Callaway announced development of a new golf ball, under the leadership of Chuck Yash, the former head of Taylormade Golf. Callaway Golf spent three years developing the ball and a state-of-the-art production facility. The company invested $170 million in research and development, and construction of the 225,000-square-foot (20,900 m^{2}) production facility.

Callaway Golf Company engineers, recruited from DuPont and Boeing, used aerodynamic computer programs (first used by Boeing and General Electric) to evaluate more than 300 dimple patterns and more than 1,000 variations of ball cores, boundary layers, and cover materials to create the new Rule 35 ball. They settled on only two versions of the Rule 35 ball—choosing to develop a "complete-performance" ball rather than separate balls developed for spin, control, distance, and durability. Ely Callaway explained the company's product development objectives as follows: "We have combined all of the performance benefits into one ball so players no longer need to sacrifice control for distance, or feel, or durability. Each Rule 35 ball contains a unique synergy of distance, control, spin, feel and durability characteristics. This eliminates confusion and guesswork in trying to identify the golf ball that is right for each individual golfer."

In 1997, Odyssey Sports was acquired, expanding Callaway's line of putters. This led to introduction of the Odyssey White Hot putter line in 2000, which would later lead to the introduction of the very popular Odyssey 2 ball white hot Mallet putter to the public in 2002.

Ely Callaway resigned as CEO and president in 1996, remaining as chairman of the board. Donald H. Dye was named CEO and president. Callaway also continued as president and CEO of Callaway Golf Ball Company. In 1998 he again became president and CEO of Callaway Golf Company, but died of pancreatic cancer on July 5, 2001. Ron Drapeau assumed his positions.

In 2003, Drapeau announced the company's intention to purchase Top-Flite Golf and its Ben Hogan Golf division soon after Top-Flite Golf filed for Chapter 11 bankruptcy. Due to competition from Adidas, the acquisition cost Callaway Golf $169 million.

On November 8, 2004, Callaway Golf named chairman and chief executive William C. Baker president and COO, replacing Patrice Hutin.

In August 2005, George Fellows was named president and CEO of Callaway Golf. He retained this position until June 2011.

In 2012, Oliver "Chip" Gordon Brewer III was named CEO of Callaway. Callaway sold the Top-Flite brand to Dick's Sporting Goods, citing declining sales, and the Ben Hogan brand to Perry Ellis International, with Callaway retaining several trademarks, including Apex and Edge.

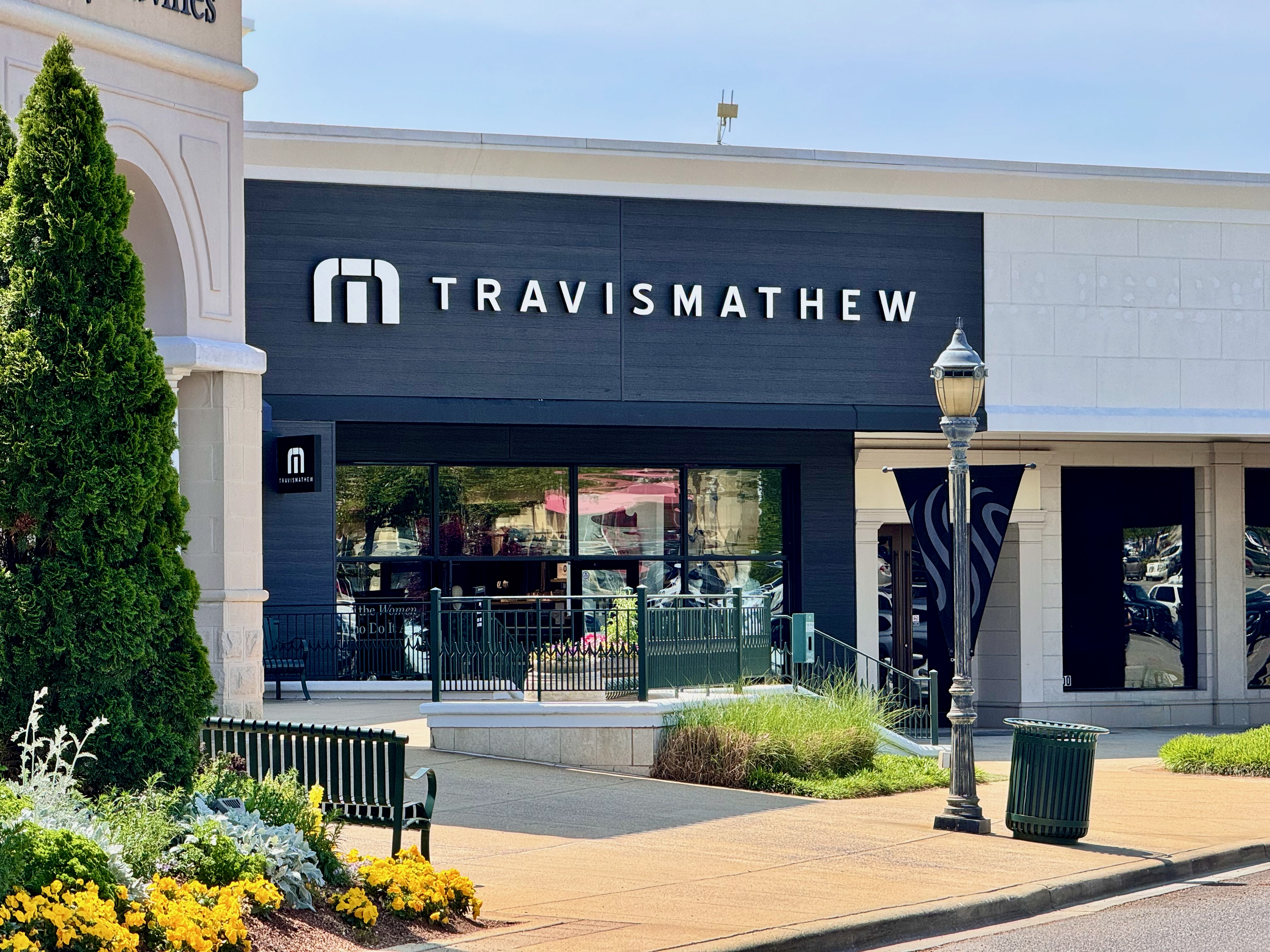
TravisMathew at The Summit (Alabama)

In 2017, Callaway acquired OGIO, a US-based bag and apparel brand, and TravisMathew, a California-based lifestyle and golf apparel brand.

In 2019, Callaway acquired German outdoor apparel company Jack Wolfskin.

On October 27, 2020, Callaway announced that it would acquire Topgolf —a chain of entertainment-oriented interactive driving ranges—for $2 billion. Callaway believed that the acquisition would help to widen its demographic reach and appeal to renewed interest in golf that had emerged since the COVID-19 pandemic. Callaway promoted that its "leadership in the global golf equipment market and geographic diversity, combined with Topgolf's revolutionary technology platform and access to golfers of all abilities, will allow both companies to accelerate growth and create competitive advantages."

On August 24, 2022, Callaway Golf Company announced that it would rebrand as Topgolf Callaway Brands; its ticker symbol on the New York Stock Exchange was changed from "ELY" to "MODG" on September 7, 2022. Topgolf Callaway CEO Chip Brewer explained that the rebrand was based on feedback from investors suggesting that an emphasis be placed on the Topgolf acquisition, and he suggested that the subsidiary could account for over half of its earnings by 2025.

On September 4, 2024, Topgolf Callaway Brands announced that it would undo the merger and split into two separate companies by late-2025; the combination of Callaway and Topgolf did not prove to be economically successful due to market conditions, and its share price had declined from $29.52 to $10.76 since the completion of the merger. Callaway would also remain the official equipment supplier for Topgolf. In October 2024, Topgolf Callaway introduced "Topgolf Shop", an online golf equipment and apparel store oriented towards beginner golfers.

Initially, Topgolf was to be spun out as a second public company held by Callaway shareholders, with Callaway retaining a stake of at least 19.9% in Topgolf and assuming Topgolf Callaway's debt. In November 2025, an agreement was reached to instead sell a 60% majority stake in Topgolf to private equity firm Leonard Green & Partners, valuing the company at $1.1 billion and providing Callaway with $770 million in net proceeds. Brewer stated that the sale provided "both significant proceeds and substantial upside in the continued growth of Topgolf,"

== Financial ==
In February 1992, Callaway Golf went public on the New York Stock Exchange with a market capitalization of $250 million. By late 1997, it reached a market capitalization of over $3.0 billion.

== Endorsements and collaborations ==
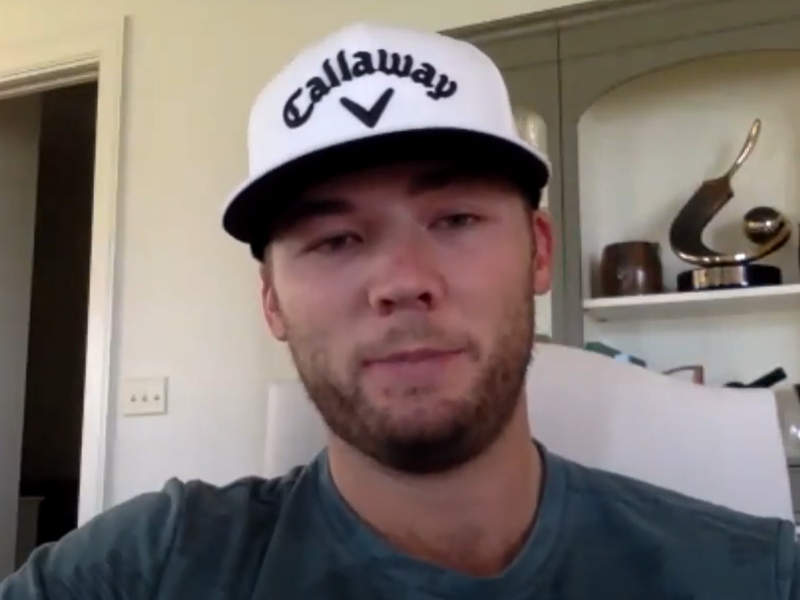
Golfer Sam Burns during a virtual interview in 2021

Callaway has maintained endorsement deals with many professional golfers who play on the world's leading tours, including Xander Schauffele, Blades Brown, Sam Burns, Min Woo Lee, Chris Kirk, Akshay Bhatia, Rasmus Hojgaard and Nicolai Højgaard.

Callaway has also had commercial relationships with major figures including Arnold Palmer and Annika Sörenstam, and celebrities such as Justin Timberlake and Stephen Curry. After being endorsed by Callaway late in his career, Seve Ballesteros expressed his gratitude to Ely Callaway by giving him a vintage Rolex, one he had worn since he first signed with the watchmaker.

In January 2023, Callaway reached an agreement with the popular golf-oriented YouTube channel Good Good, which would include collaborations with the company on its video content, as well as the ability to release co-branded apparel and equipment.

In September 2024, Callaway appointed entertainer and Arashi member Masaki Aiba as a brand ambassador in Japan; the collaboration included an Instagram page featuring Aiba, and a co-branded apparel collection released in 2025.

In August 2026, Callaway and Good Good faced criticism over an advertisement for a Good Good-branded driver, which opened with a scene of Good Good co-founder Garrett Clark shoving female golfer Alexis Miestowski to the ground as she went to touch the driver. The commercial was described as promoting violence against women; on August 23, Good Good announced that the commercial would be pulled, with Callaway stating that they were "appreciative of Good Good for addressing this", and that "we look forward to working together to ensure a more inclusive space in golf." On August 27, 2026, Callaway announced that it would end the Good Good partnership effective immediately, and pledge to donate $1 million towards organizations advocating against violence against women.

== Locations ==
=== Manufacturing ===
- Chicopee, MA - Golf Ball Operations

== Awards ==
On December 8, 2005, Callaway Golf received the 2005 Torch Award for Marketplace Ethics, from the San Diego Better Business Bureau.
