= Lionel Kelleway =

British radio presenter (born 1944)

- Born: 1944 (age 81–82); Chichester, England, United Kingdom
- Education: University College of Swansea
- Occupation: Radio presenter

Lionel Kelleway (born 1944) is a British radio presenter. For many years until 2009, he was the lead presenter of the BBC Radio 4 natural history documentary series, The Living World.

== Early life and education ==
Kelleway was born in Chichester but moved to Wales in 1974. He studied at University College of Swansea. At one time, he worked as a gamekeeper.

== Legal case ==
In 2001, Kelleway won a case for racial discrimination against BBC Radio Wales, when they dropped his Landmark series, which won Sony Awards in 1991 and 1992, after around ten years, because of his English accent. At the time, he was living at Rhyd Uchaf Whitemill, Carmarthenshire.
