= Thomas E. Askew =

American photographer (c. 1847–1914)

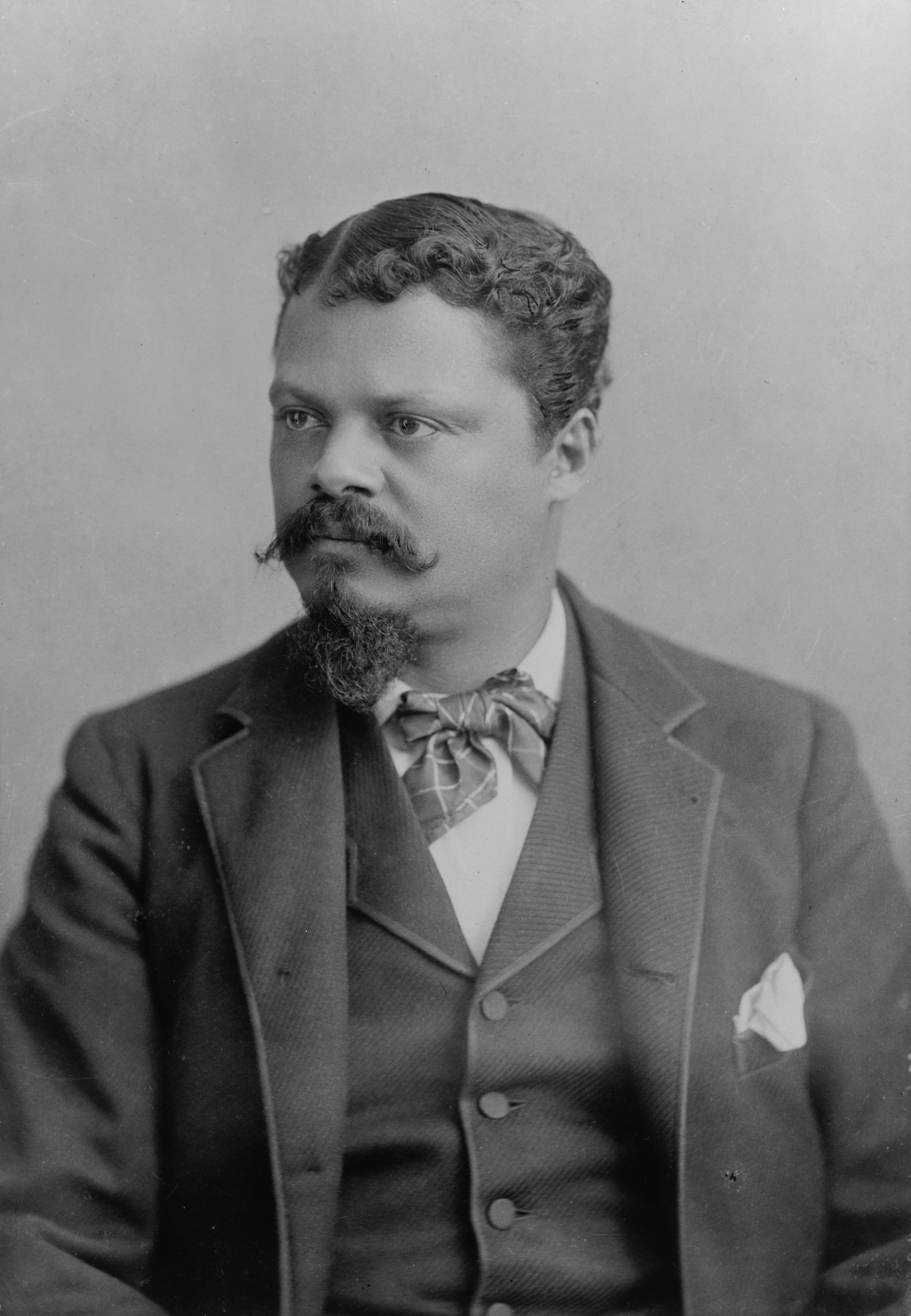
Self-portrait of Thomas E. Askew

Thomas E. Askew (c. 1847 – July 12, 1914) was an African American photographer based in Atlanta, Georgia. He was among the earliest Black professional photographers in Atlanta, and is best known as a principal contributor to W. E. B. Du Bois's Exhibit of American Negroes at the 1900 Paris Exposition.

== Career ==
Askew began his photography career in the 1880s, working at the studio of downtown Atlanta photographer C. W. Motes before opening his own studio in his home at 114 Summit Avenue. His subjects included his own family, members of Atlanta's Black middle class, and students and faculty at Atlanta University, including students of Spelman College.

== Paris Exposition contribution ==
For the 1900 Paris Exposition, Du Bois and Thomas Junius Calloway assembled an exhibit on African American life and progress that included some 500 photographs, displayed alongside statistical charts and a library of books by Black authors. Many of Askew's photographs were included in three bound albums titled Types of American Negroes and Negro Life in Georgia, U.S.A. The exhibit received a grand prize at the Exposition.

The photographers whose work appeared in the exhibit were not individually credited at the time, and Du Bois himself wrote only briefly about them, observing that the volumes contained "several volumes of photographs of typical Negro faces, which hardly square with conventional American ideas." Attribution of specific photographs to Askew was undertaken much later by scholar Deborah Willis, who identified him as a primary contributor to the exhibit.

== Death and legacy ==
Askew died on July 12, 1914, and was buried at Atlanta's Oakland Cemetery. Three years after his death, the Great Atlanta Fire of 1917 destroyed his studio and the negatives and equipment that remained in it.

Askew's work received renewed scholarly attention in the early twenty-first century. Willis and David Levering Lewis's 2003 book A Small Nation of People reproduced and discussed his Paris Exposition photographs, and Shawn Michelle Smith's 2004 study Photography on the Color Line included an extended analysis of his portraits in the context of Du Bois's visual argument against racial stereotypes. In 2026, The Atlanta Journal-Constitution produced a Black History Month series re-creating Du Bois's Paris Exposition project, in which Askew's role as the photographer behind many of the original images was highlighted.

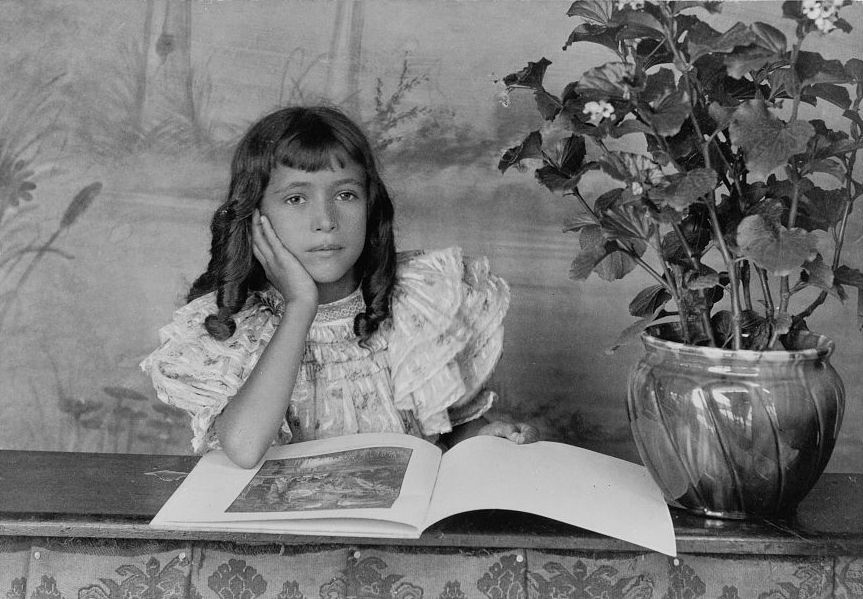
Photographic portrait of Askew's daughter

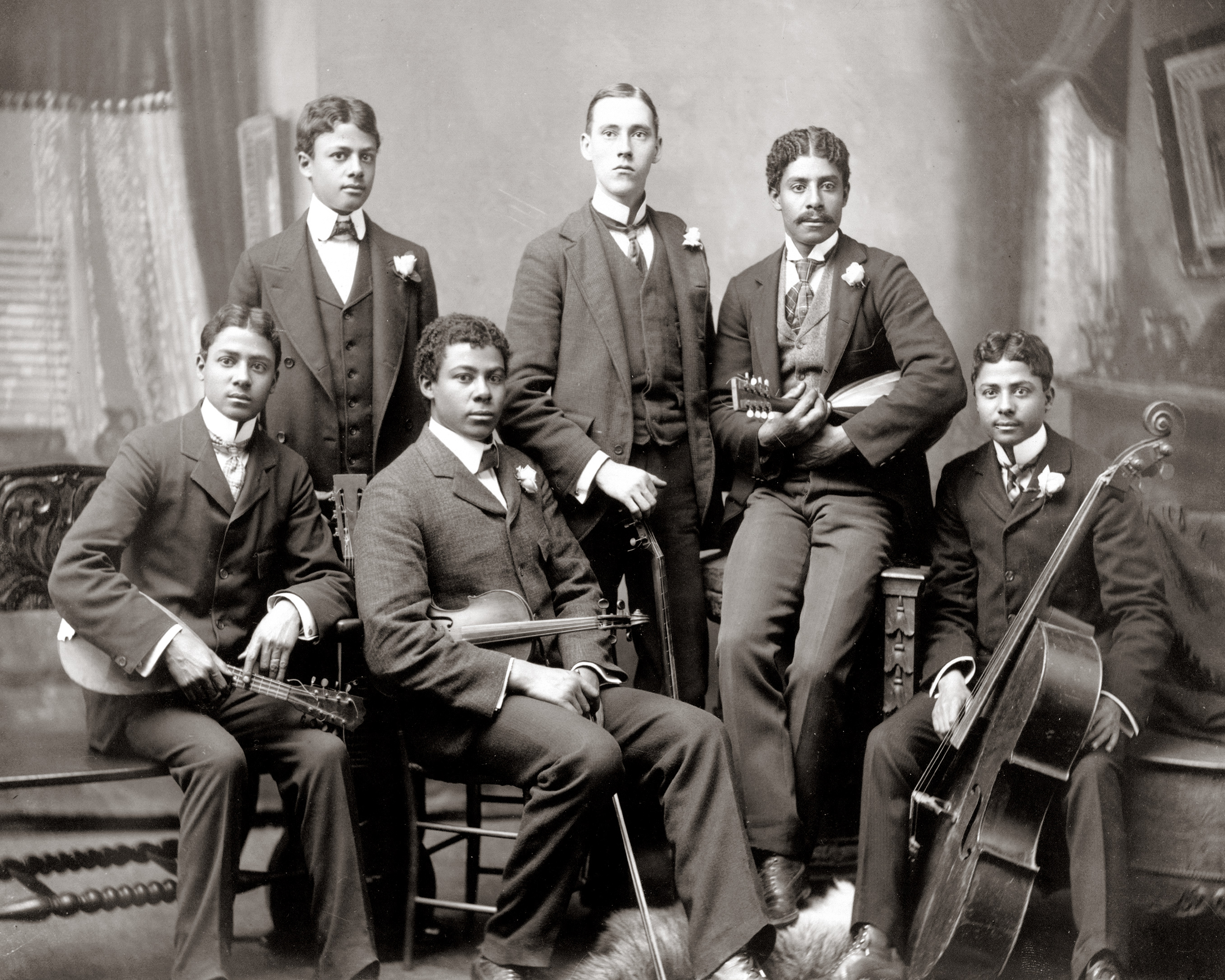
Summit Avenue Ensemble: Askew's sons and a neighbor

Askew's 1899 photograph African American men and women posed for portrait on steps at Atlanta University, Georgia was featured in the television series Abbott Elementary, season three, episode "Willard R. Abbott," in which the image was used to celebrate historical Black public-school teachers.
