= Kowaliga =

Kowaliga is a name. It may refer to:

- Kowaliga, Alabama
- Kowaliga School
- Kaw-Liga (also spelled Kowaliga), a 1953 country song by Hank Williams
