= Barbara Pope =

Barbara Pope may refer to:

- Barbara Corrado Pope (born 1941), novelist and historian
- Barbara E. Pope (1854–1908), African-American teacher, writer and activist
- Barbara S. Pope (born 1951), United States Assistant Secretary of the Navy
