= William E. Benson =

American businessman and educator (1873–1915)

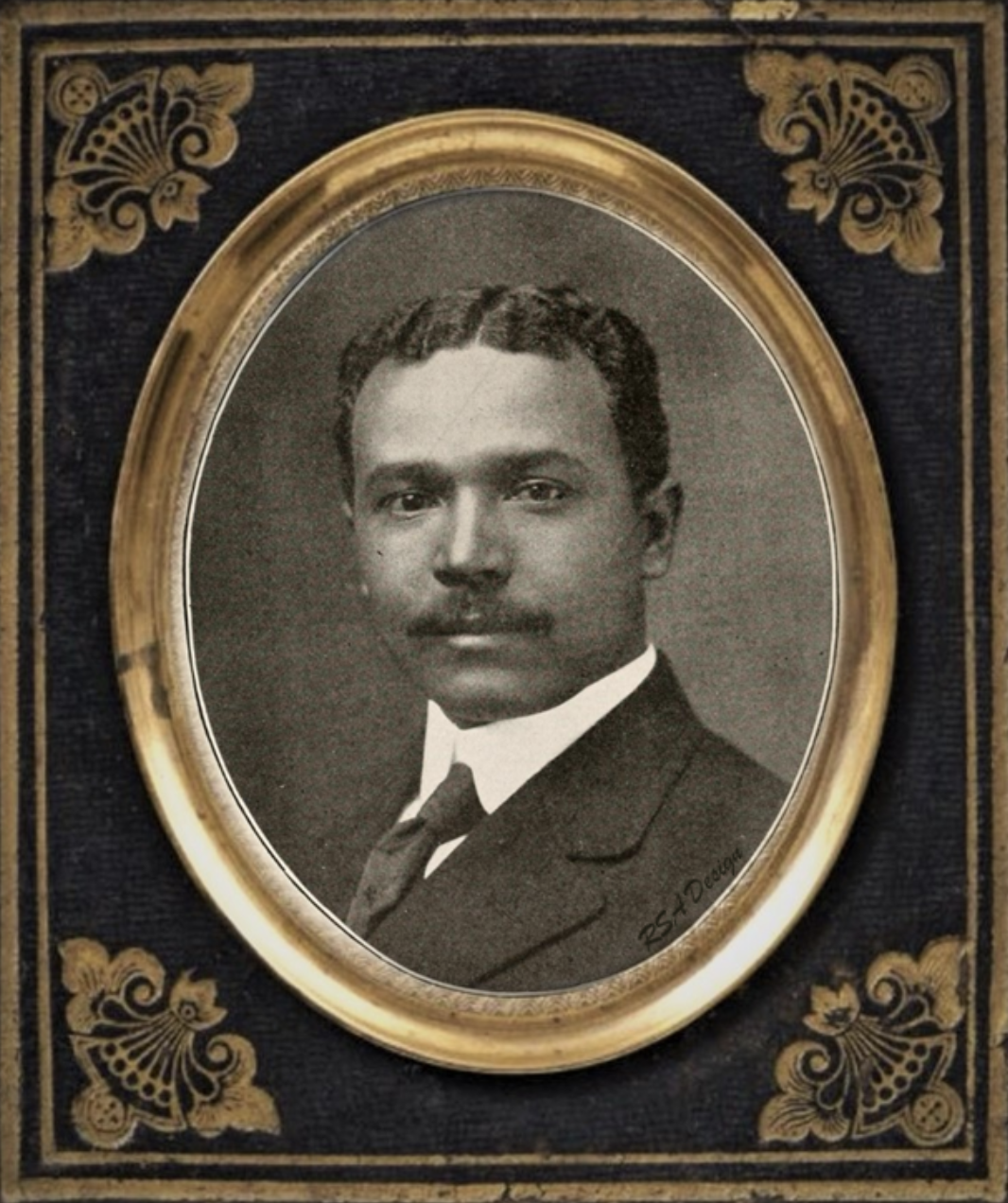
- Born: 1873; Kowaliga, Alabama, U.S.
- Died: October 1915 (aged 41–42); U.S.
- Other names: Will Benson
- Education: Fisk University
- Alma mater: Howard University
- Occupation(s): School founder, principal, businessman, real estate developer
- Father: John Jackson Benson

William E. Benson (1873–1915), commonly known as Will Benson, was an American educator, real estate developer, and businessman. He was known for founding the Kowaliga Academic and Industrial Institute, and the Dixie Industrial Company in Kowaliga, Alabama.

== Early life ==
William E. Benson was born on 1873 in Kowaliga, Alabama to parents Julia (or Lucy Jane Wiley) and John Jackson Benson (September 1850–November 9, 1925). He was the only son, and had three sisters.

He first attended Fisk University in Nashville, and later graduated with a B.A. degree (1885) from Howard University.

== Career ==
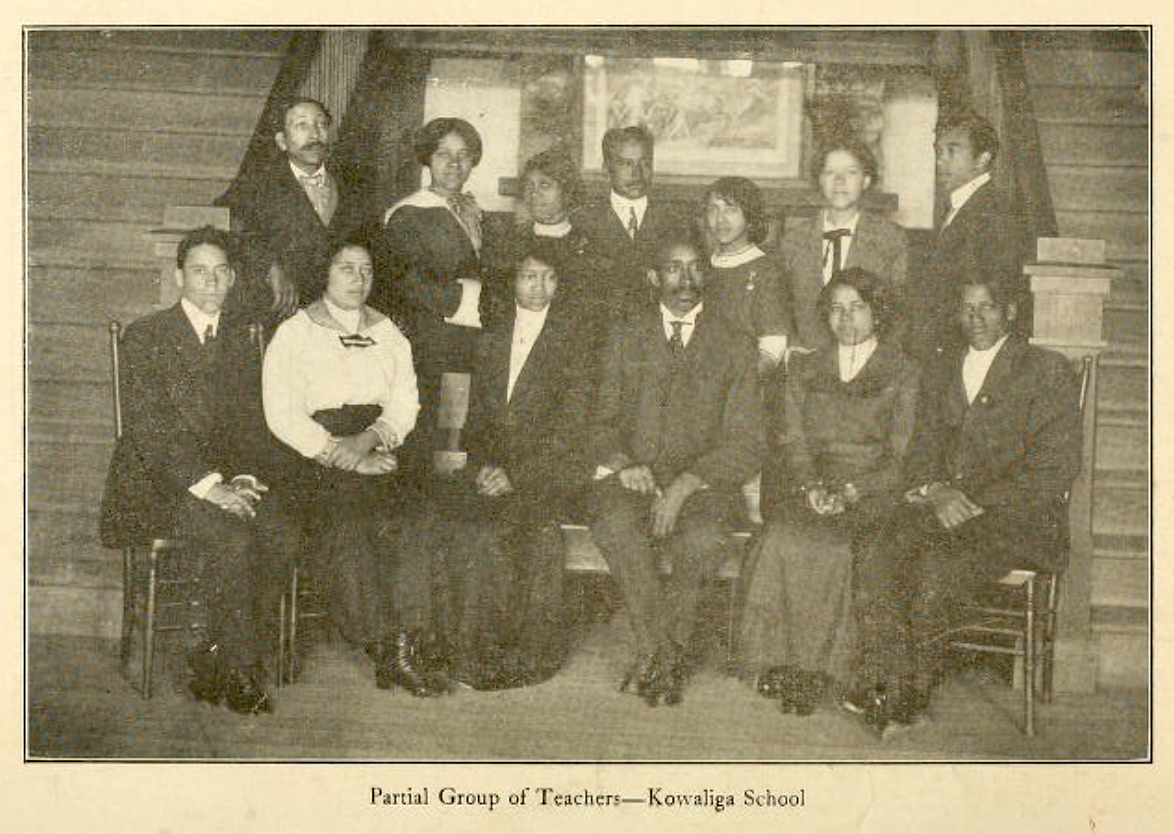
Partial group of teachers (c. 1913) from Kowaliga Academic and Industrial Institute

After university, Benson moved back to his hometown. With the help of his father he created the Kowaliga Academic and Industrial Institute in roughly 1895. The focus of the school was to improve the lives of the local African American population living in rural Alabama. The Kowaliga Academic and Industrial Institute for the Colored Race (also known as Kowaliga Industrial School, or Kowaliga School) was established in roughly 1895, the first building cornerstone was laid in August 1896, and it was incorporated in 1899. Benson was one of many first trustees of the school, and he did a lot of national fundraising for the school and scholarships.

From 1900 until June 1915, Benson serving as the founding president to the Dixie Industrial Company, an industry-centered company designed to put his former students to work locally. He was ousted by the stockholders, which ended in a legal battle that continued after his death.

== Death and school closing ==
After Benson's death in October 1915, he was buried on the grounds of the Kowaliga Academic and Industrial Institute. The school he created continued for many more years after his death, educating hundreds of Black students during a place and time where this education was difficult to access. The school closed around 1925. Kowaliga was submerged by Lake Martin after the construction of a Martin Dam in 1926.
