= Isaiah T. Hatton =

American architect (1883–1921)

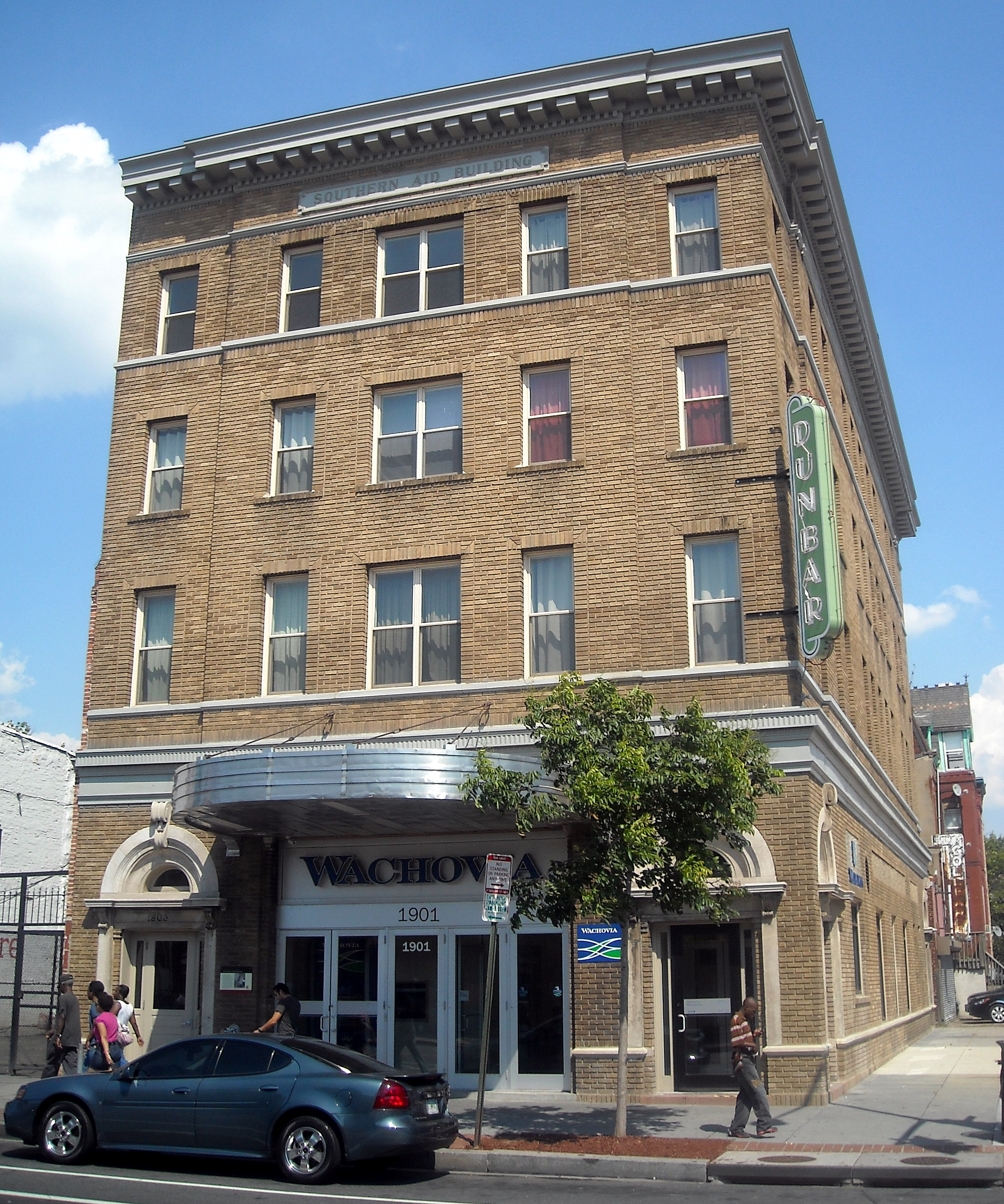
Southern Aid Society building and Dunbar Theater (Southern Aid Society-Dunbar Theater Building)

Isaiah T. Hatton (1883–1921) was an architect in the United States known for his designs of buildings for his fellow African Americans. Several are listed on the National Register of Historic Places.

Hatton was the only son of Isaiah and Mary Susan Hatton and was born on March 1, 1883, in Hagerstown, Maryland. His family moved to Washington D.C. when he was seven. He married Bertha B. Sayles. They did not have children. Several buildings he designed are listed on the National Register of Historic Places (NRHP).

== Works ==
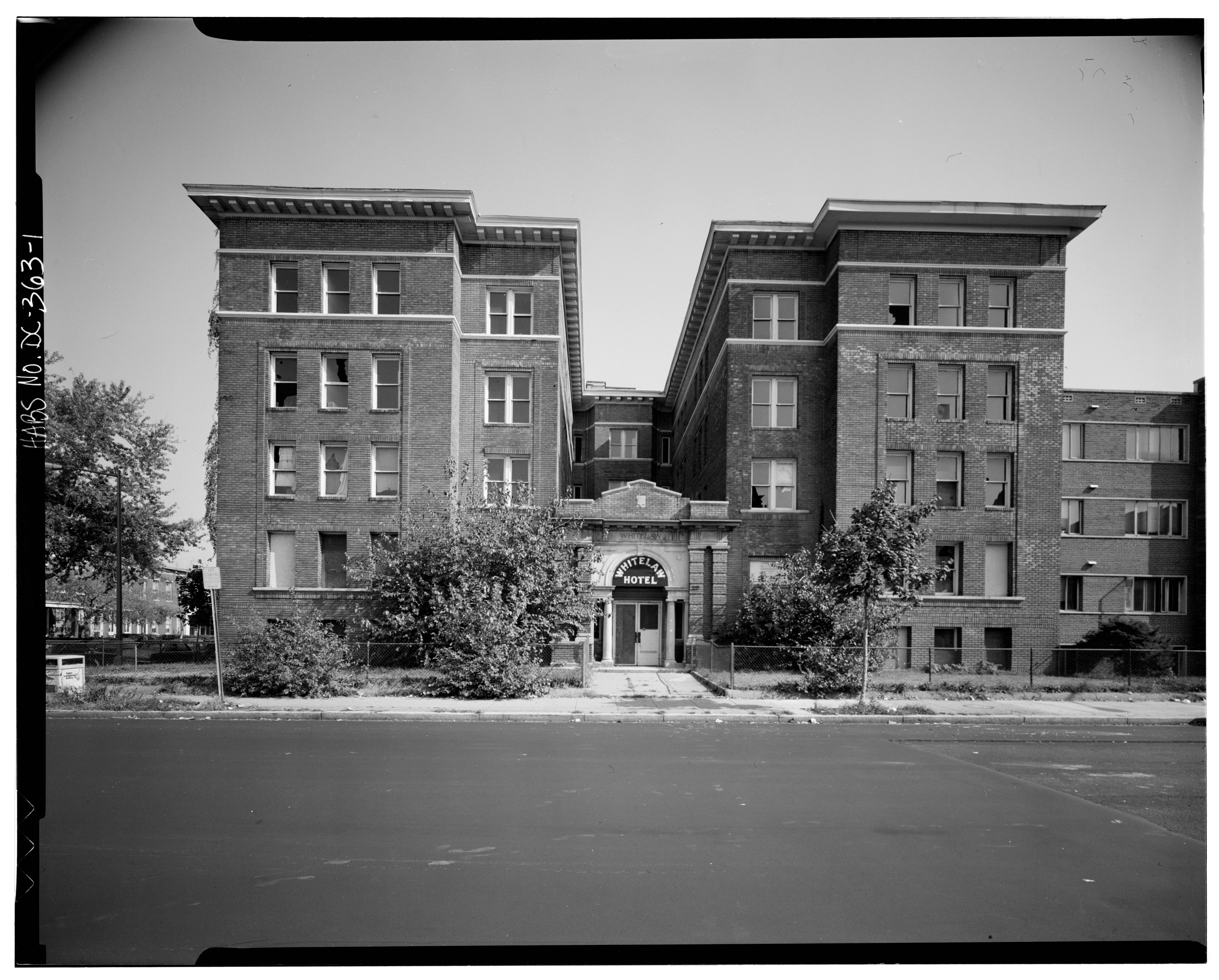
Whitelaw Apartment House (Whitelaw Hotel) in a photograph taken as part of the Historic American Buildings Survey

Selected works include:

- Third Baptist Church (1893), 1546 5th St., NW, Washington, D.C. (designed with fellow African American architect Calvin Brent), NRHP-listed
- Thomas J. Calloway House (1910), 9949 Elm Street, Lanham, Maryland, for Thomas Junius Calloway, an African American developer of the Lincoln community in Lanham, Maryland in Prince George's County, Maryland. NRHP-listed
- His own residence at 5502 Center Ave (1911) in Lincoln
- Industrial Bank building (1915) for John Whitelaw Lewis at 12th and U streets NW The bank's original location was in the Laborers' Building and Loan Association building designed by architect William Sidney Pittman. Although the bank closed in the 1930s, a Howard University graduate reopened it.
- Isaiah T. Hatton House in the Buena Vista section of Prince George's County where he moved in 1918.
- Whitelaw Hotel (1919), 1839 13th St. NW, Washington, D.C. NRHP-listed Also known as the Whitelaw Apartment House
- Southern Aid Society building (Southern Aid Society-Dunbar Theater Building), (1921) 1901–1903 Seventh St. NW, Washington, D.C., NRHP-listed
- Daniel P. Seaton House in Lincoln for Daniel P. Seaton, who wrote a book advocating Christian Zionism
