= Industrial bank =

Industrial Bank is another name for an industrial loan company.

Industrial Bank is also the name of some banks:

- Industrial Bank (China)
- Industrial Bank of Iraq
- Industrial Bank of Korea
- Industrial and Commercial Bank of China
- Industrial Bank of Kuwait
- Industrial Bank (Washington D.C.), a historic African American bank in Washington D.C.
