= Barbara E. Pope =

American writer, teacher, and civil rights activist (1854–1908)

- Born: January 1854; Washington, DC, US
- Died: September 1908 (aged 54); Washington, DC, US
- Occupation(s): Teacher, Writer, Activist

Barbara E. Pope (1854–1908) was a teacher, author, and civil rights activist.

== Early life ==
Barbara Pope was born in Georgetown, District of Columbia in January 1854 to Alfred and Hannah Pope, one of nine children. Alfred had been one of a group of slaves who had unsuccessfully attempted to escape from the District to New Jersey on the schooner Pearl in 1848. (Note: The Pearl had been chartered to carry escaping slaves from Washington to New Jersey and freedom. The more than 75 fleeing blacks boarded the Pearl on April 15, 1848. The schooner was delayed by lack of wind and then bad weather, and was captured by a pursuing steamboat while still in Virginia waters. The attempted escape and recapture of the slaves resulted in disturbances in Washington, with the event being known as the Pearl Affair.) Alfred and Hannah were freed when their owner died in 1850. Alfred worked in waste removal, acquired real estate, and became a member of the Board of Trustees of Colored Schools of Washington and Georgetown.

== Teacher ==
Pope was 16 years old when she became a teacher in those schools in 1873. In 1884 she had a one-year appointment to the faculty of the Tuskegee Normal Institute in Alabama, and then returned to teach in Washington. In 1888, a student physically assaulted her, and she refused to re-admit the student to her classroom until he apologized. Although the Board of Trustees ordered her to re-admit the student, Pope did not find the student's apology to be sufficient and resigned from her position.

== Author ==
In 1881 four of Pope's short stories were published in Waverly Magazine, a "weekly magazine for ladies". The stories were so well received that The Broad Ax proclaimed Pope "A new literary star". Those four stories were later included in Daniel Murray, Thomas J. Calloway and W. E. B. Du Bois's landmark The Exhibit of American Negroes organized for the 1900 Paris World's Fair.

== Activist ==
While Barbara Pope was attracted to the political philosophy of W. E. B. Du Bois, her father, Alfred, favored that of Booker T. Washington. She eventually broke with her father, becoming one of the first female members of Du Bois's Niagara Movement.

Pope and her sisters, along with many other well-to-do African-Americans in Washington, would vacation in Loudoun County, Virginia. On August 7, 1906, Pope bought a train ticket in Washington for Paeonian Springs, in Loudon County. After boarding the train, she chose a seat in the "white-only" section of the car, rather than the "Jim Crow" section. She refused to move to the "Jim Crow" section, and was removed from the train at Falls Church, Virginia. She was fined $10 by the city judge. Pope was then invited to the 1906 meeting of the Niagara Movement in Harper's Ferry, West Virginia, where the meeting voted to support Pope in appealing her fine. The fine was upheld in trial court, but the Supreme Court of Virginia overturned the verdict and ordered that the fine be refunded to her. Pope then sued the Southern Railway Company, asking for damages of $20,000. In June 1907, the Supreme Court of the District of Columbia found for her, but reduced the award to one cent.

== Death ==
Pope's lawsuits were not viewed favorably by her family. She suffered from insomnia for many months in 1908, and moved to Winchester, Virginia in June in hopes of recovering there. On September 5, 1908, Barbara Pope committed suicide by hanging herself.
