= Clinton J. Calloway =

Booster of schools for African Americans

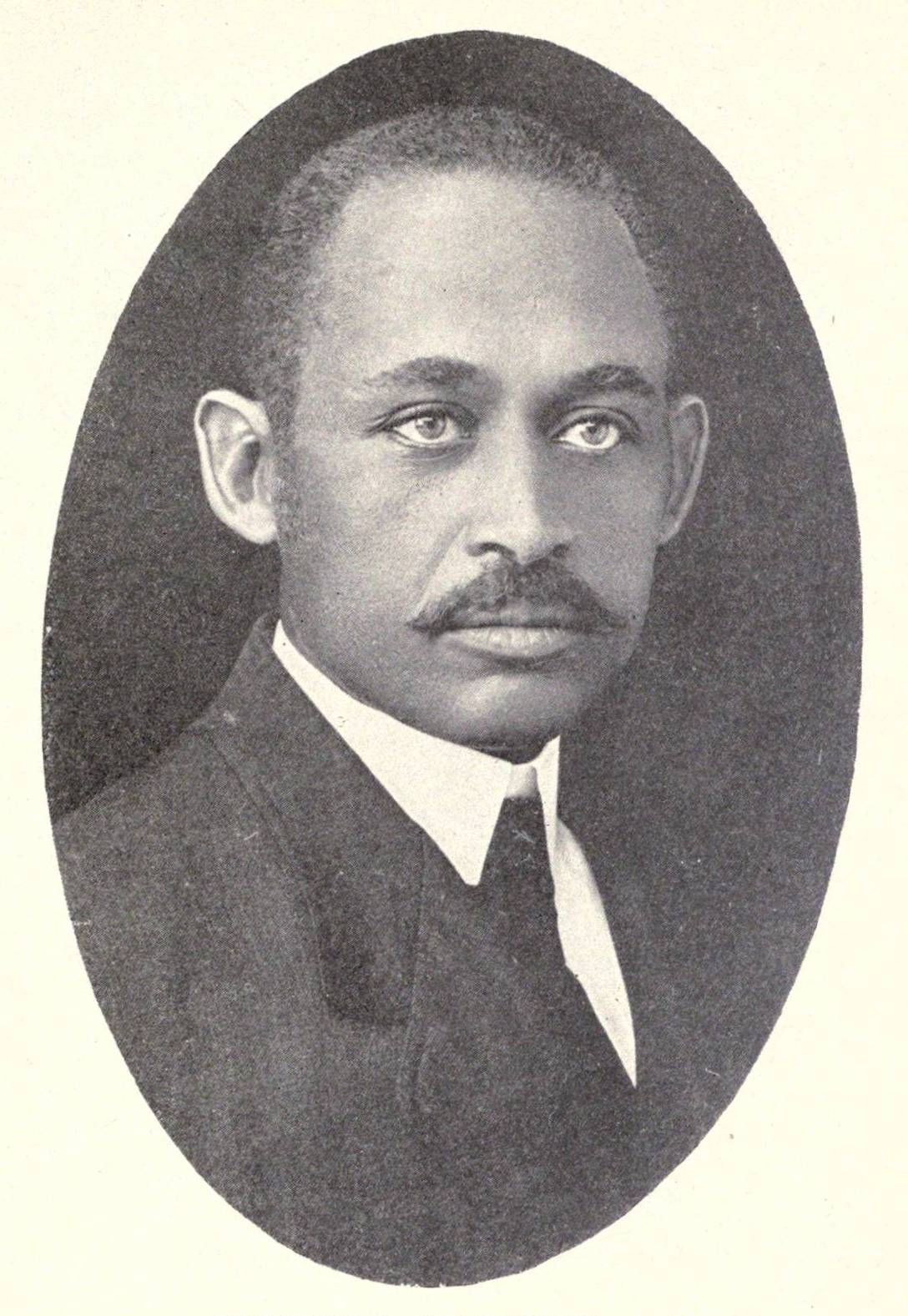

Clinton J. Calloway (April 18, 1869–1940) was an American educator and school administrator. He was a leader of efforts to open and improve rural schools in Alabama and other areas in the American South.

== Biography ==
Clinton J. Calloway was born in Cleveland, Tennessee, one of seven children. He married Josie Elizabeth Schooler March 12, 1901. He was a Fisk University graduate.

He headed Tuskegee Institute’s extension department and helped lead efforts to establish schools for African Americans in rural communities. Dana R. Chandler, an archivist and associate professor at Tuskegee University has written about him. He and Booker T. Washington wrote The Negro Rural School and its Relation to the Community. He corresponded with N. C. Newbold. His older brother Thomas J. Calloway, a lawyer and educator, also worked at the Tuskegee Institute.

After the 1899 incorporation of the Kowaliga Academic and Industrial Institute in the community of Kowaliga, Alabama, Calloway served as one of the founding members of the Board of Trustees for the private African-American school.

== See also ==
- Jeanes Foundation
- Rosenwald School
