= James Nathan Calloway =

American agriculturalist

- Born: 1865; Cleveland, Tennessee, US
- Died: Unknown
- Education: Fisk University
- Scientific career
- Fields: Agriculture
- Workplaces: Tuskegee Institute

James Nathan Calloway (1865 – after 1930) was an American agriculturalist. Born in slavery in Tennessee, Calloway graduated from Fisk University before joining the faculty of the Tuskegee Institute. Initially a lecturer in mathematics, he became involved in agricultural science and was appointed manager of the institute's largest farm in 1897. He was selected to lead an expedition to German Togoland in 1900 to promote the production of cotton there. Calloway bred a special strain of the plant suited to local conditions but returned to the United States a year later. The experimental station that he founded remained in use until 1919 and established cotton as a staple crop of the colony. He returned to Tuskegee as farm manager and taught agriculture there until at least 1930.

== Early life and career ==
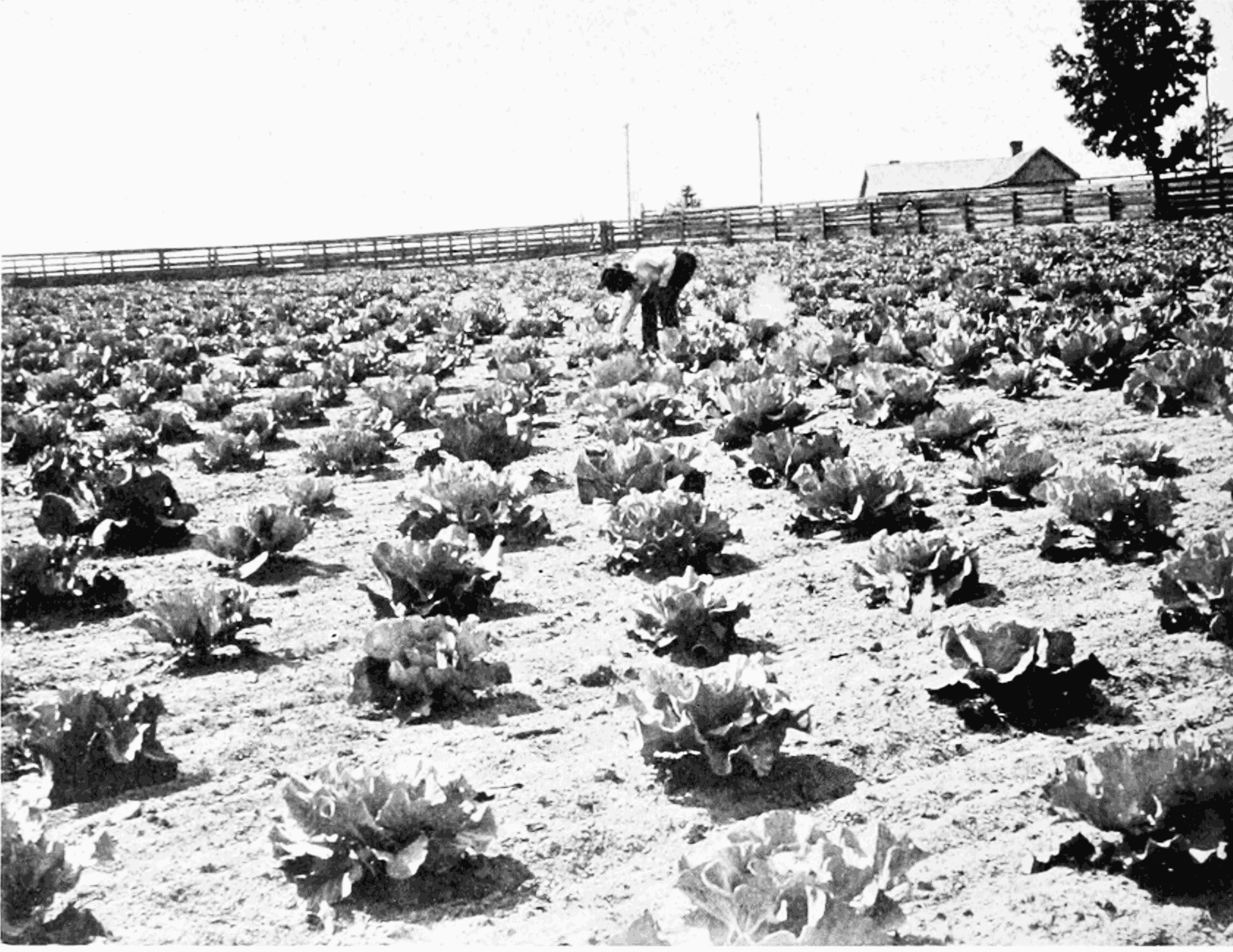
A cabbage field at the Tuskegee Institute in 1899

James Nathan Calloway was born in slavery in Cleveland, Tennessee in 1865, but his family later lived near to Tuskegee, Alabama. He studied at Fisk University in Tennessee, where he learned German, and graduated in 1890.

Immediately after graduation he joined the Tuskegee Institute, which sought to educate African Americans in the Southern United States, as a mathematics lecturer. Calloway was appointed inspector of the institute's Home Farm in 1892 after George Washington Carver perceived failings in its management under Charles W. Green. Calloway reported that the farm suffered from neglect of its tomato, sweet potato, and grape crops, but described the management of its cabbage crop and dairy farm as good. Calloway became a business agent for the Institute in 1893 and in 1897 was appointed manager of its 800-acre (320 ha) Marshall Farm, its largest agricultural site.

== Togo expedition ==
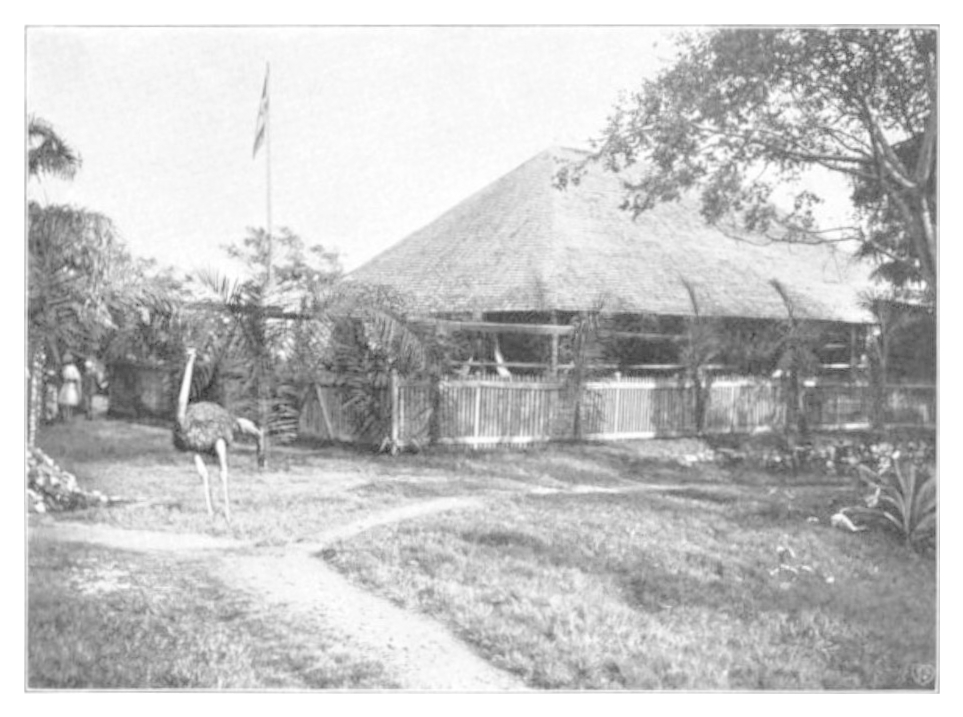
Missahoe station 1904

In 1900, Calloway was chosen as leader of the Tuskegee-Togo Cotton Scheme. This scheme was carried out by the Institute in conjunction with the German government's Kolonial-Wirtschaftliches Komitee (Colonial Economic Committee), with the stated aim "to train Africans in cotton culture and to experiment with the cloning of local and imported cotton in order to develop a strong commercially successful hybrid". The Germans hoped to transform their newly expanded colony of Togoland into a cotton-producing agricultural state and reduce their reliance on imported American-produced cotton. The cotton industry was chosen since, being a high-labour and low-value crop, it would limit the wealth of the African farmers who might otherwise engage in political resistance. The Germans had hoped the scheme would instil obedience into the Togolese population, reduce the autonomy of women, and tie the previously migratory population to the land. The Tuskegee Institute's leader Booker T. Washington, though generally opposed to colonialism, was willing to assist the German authorities in this manner to progress the welfare of the African population. It marked the first occasion that a major African American institution from the Southern US engaged in an economic or scientific endeavour with a major foreign power.

In preparation for the expedition, Calloway bred a new strain of cotton which was better suited to mechanical spinning and weaving than the native variety. His role on the expedition was described by the German agricultural attaché in Washington, D.C., Baron Beno von Herman auf Wain, as "finding the necessary authority towards the native population and in having at the same time the necessary respect towards the German government official". Calloway and a party of three Tuskegee students left New York on November 3, 1900, and travelled by boat via Hamburg, arriving in Togoland on January 1, 1901. Their intention was to establish an experimental cotton-growing station at Missahoe.

Upon arrival in Togo, it was found that the Africans were unwilling to pull the expedition's wagons but were happy to carry loads on their heads. This meant that Calloway had to source draft animals (cattle and horses) from French Sudan to carry the heavier loads. These animals, however, died from the effects of the Tsetse fly before they could be put to use on the station in harnesses. This meant that the station's plows and machinery had to be driven by manpower. Four Togolese men were harnessed to each plow and 36 to the station's cotton gin, in a move described by historian Clarence Lausane in 2003 as "inhumane". The station was also blighted by locusts, ants, "bug-a-bugs", and "jiggers".

Calloway's seeds were distributed to the Togolese who were encouraged to sell their raw cotton rather than weave it themselves, and hence transition cotton in the colony from a cottage industry into an agricultural export. This proved unpopular, as it was perceived as requiring more work for less reward. The German authorities were forced to use the threat of force and prison labor to ensure success of the scheme. The Tuskegee Institute did not foresee this, assuming that the population was destitute and would be keen to engage with the project. A three-year cotton school was established for locals, with education in agriculture and cotton ginning. Some 25 bales of cotton were produced in the first year of the station, increasing to 122 bales by 1903. Calloway left Togoland in 1901.

The project suffered heavy losses among Tuskagee students, with four out of eight sent dying by 1909 and others returning home. Two students died in 1902 before even setting foot in Togoland, drowning when the boat carrying them to shore overturned. Student John W. Robinson led the experiment for some time, though he also drowned in a canoe accident in 1909, after which there was no Tuskegee representation. The station survived until the end of the German colonial era in 1919. Though it failed to achieve the German objective of providing a significant non-American source of cotton, it still established the crop as a staple of the Togolese economy and increased the power of the Togolese people.

== Later career ==
Cutting sugar cane at Marshall Farm in 1902

After his return to the United States, Calloway was back at the Marshall Farm, teaching 30 to 45 boys there by 1904. He remained a teacher of agriculture at Tuskegee until at least 1930.

== Family ==
Calloway had five children, including Nathaniel O Calloway, who taught at the University of Illinois medical school and served as a major in the US Army Medical Corps during the Korean War. Calloway's younger brother Thomas Junius Calloway was also a Fisk graduate and a friend of W. E. B. Du Bois; another younger brother, Clinton Joseph Calloway, joined the agricultural department at Tuskagee during Calloway's period in Togoland.
