= Thomas J. Calloway House =

Historic house in Maryland, United States

- U.S. National Register of Historic Places
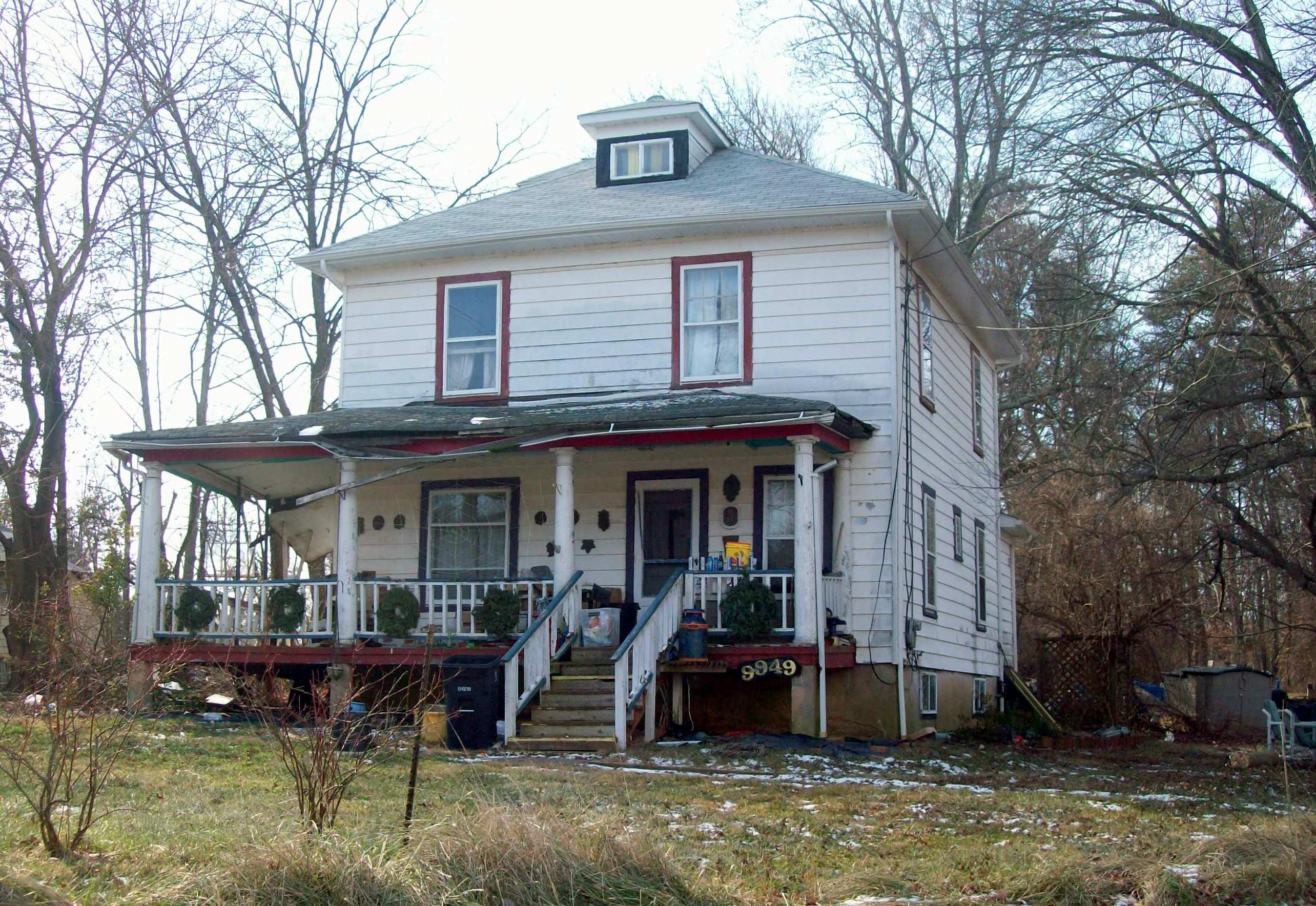
- Thomas J. Calloway House, December 2010

- Location within Maryland Location within the United States
- Location: 9949 Elm St., Lanham, Maryland
- Coordinates: 38°57′52″N 76°49′11″W
- Built: 1910
- Architect: Isaiah T. Hatton
- MPS: African-American Historic Resources of Prince George's County, Maryland
- NRHP reference No.: 05000148
- Added to NRHP: March 14, 2005

The Thomas J. Calloway House, constructed in 1910, stands on the south side of Elm Street adjacent to Crescent Avenue in the traditionally African-American neighborhood of Lincoln in Lanham, Prince George's County, Maryland. It is credited to Isaiah T. Hatton, an early African-American architect.

Thomas Junius Calloway was a prominent lawyer, educator, civil servant, and African American activist until his death in 1930. He was vice president and general manager of the Lincoln Land Improvement Company and served as first principal of the Lincoln School. The house is a 2 1/2-story, wood-frame Foursquare residence with a poured concrete foundation. The house retains its original plan and is still in use as a residence.

It was listed on the National Register of Historic Places in 2005.
