= Daniel P. Seaton =

American doctor, minister, and author (1835–1918)

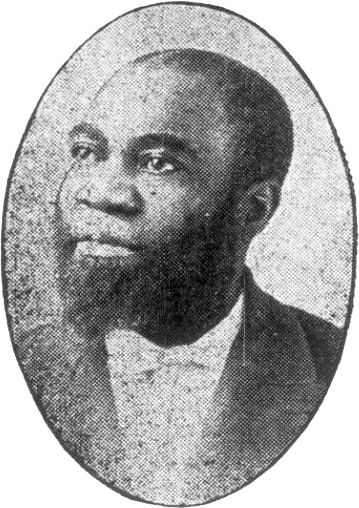
- Seaton in a 1906 newspaper
- Born: December 7, 1835 near Reistertown, Maryland, U.S.
- Died: January 27, 1918 (aged 82); Lincoln, Lanham, Maryland, U.S.
- Occupations: Physician; minister; writer
- Spouse: Letitia A. Brown (m. 1906)
- Children: 4

Daniel P. Seaton (December 7, 1835 – January 27, 1918) was a doctor, African Methodist Episcopalian (A.M.E.) minister, and author.

== Early life ==
Daniel P. Seaton was born on December 7, 1835, near Reistertown, Maryland. He spent his early life in New York.

== Career ==
Seaton studied medicine in Chicago while working as a pastor in Illinois. He also preached in Missouri, Virginia and the Baltimore conference. He was a pastor at Trinity, Bethel, St. John's and Waters A.M.E. churches in Baltimore. He retired as presiding elder of the Potomac District A.M.E. Conference in April 1917. Seaton established a church in the community and served as a doctor.

He traveled to the Middle East and wrote The land of promise or The Bible land and its revelation. It was illustrated with engravings of "some of the most important places in Palestine and Syria" and published in Philadelphia, Pennsylvania by the Publishing House of the A.M.E. Church in 1895. The book advocated for the conversion of Jews to Christianity and their return to Palestine.

Seaton was a leader of the Good Samaritans and was a Mason.

== Personal life ==
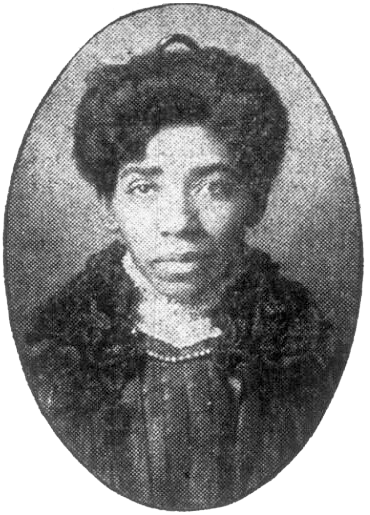
Letitia A. Brown, wife of Seaton

Seaton married Letitia A. Brown of Wilkes-Barre, Pennsylvania, on September 5, 1906. They had one son and three daughters, Frederick A., Francinia, Luxconia and Louisa.

His home in the Lincoln area outside of Washington, D.C, was designed by African American architect Isaiah Hatton.

Seaton died on January 27, 1918, at his home in Lincoln, Lanham, Maryland.

== Legacy ==
The Seaton Memorial African Methodist Episcopalian Church in Lincoln, Lanham, Maryland, is named for him.

== See also ==
- Zionism
- Christian Zionism
