= Deborah Willis =

Deborah Willis may refer to:

- Deborah Willis (academic), New Zealand professor of education
- Deborah Willis (artist) (born 1948), American artist, photographer and educator
- Deborah Willis (author) (born 1982), Canadian short story writer
