= Whitelaw Hotel =

- U.S. National Register of Historic Places
- U.S. Historic district – Contributing property
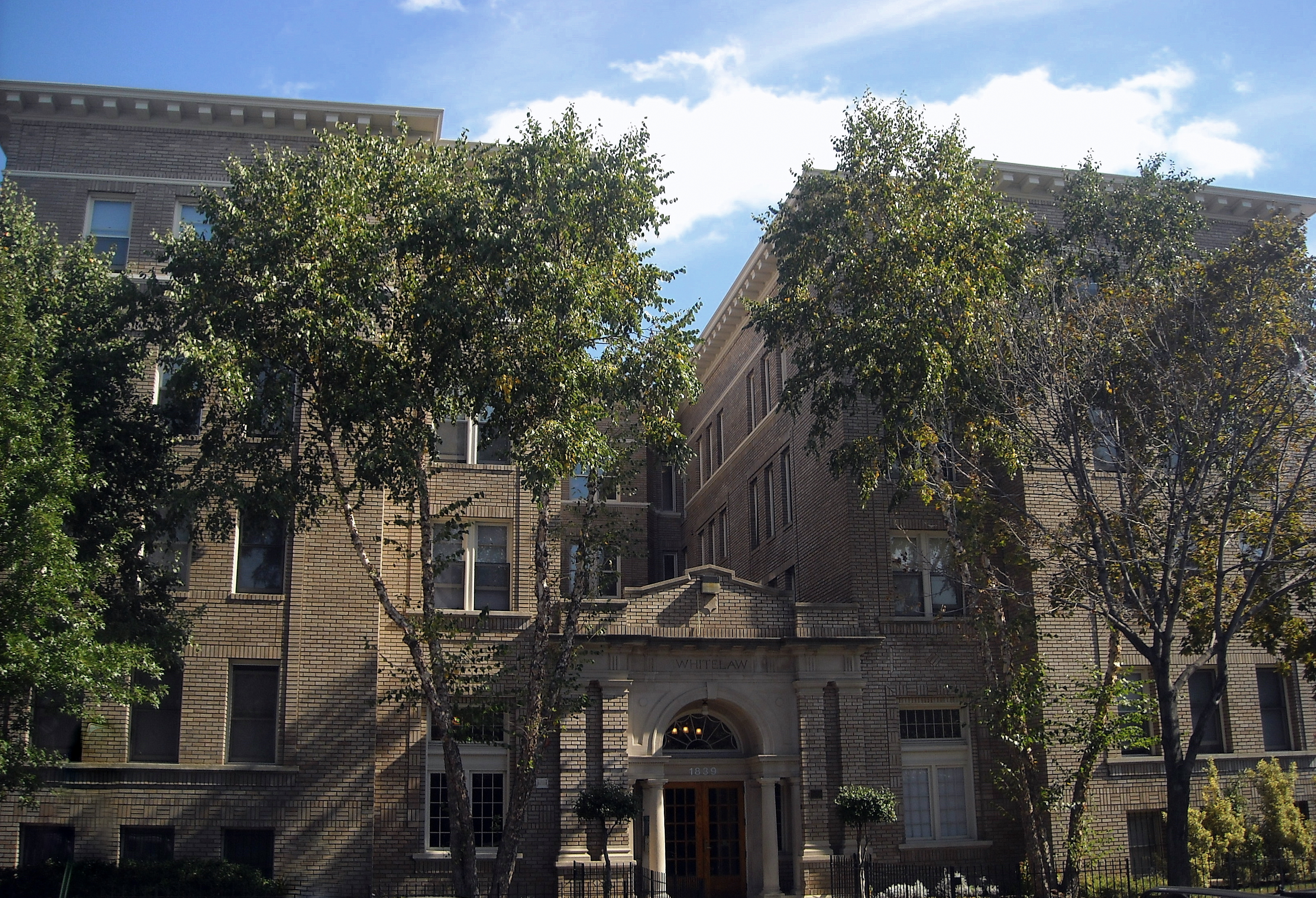

- Location within Washington, D.C.
- Location: 1839 13th St. NW; Washington, D.C.
- Coordinates: 38°54′54″N 77°1′48″W
- Built: 1919
- Architect: Isaiah T. Hatton
- Architectural style: Renaissance Revival
- Part of: Greater U Street Historic District (ID93001129)
- NRHP reference No.: 93000595
- Added to NRHP: July 14, 1993

The Whitelaw Hotel is a historic structure located in the U Street Corridor (a.k.a. Cardozo/Shaw) in Northwest Washington, D.C. It was listed on the National Register of Historic Places in 1993.

== History ==
The Whitelaw was built in 1919 as an upscale apartment hotel during the segregation era. The building was designed by architect Isaiah T. Hatton, who was one of the nation's first African American architects. Hatton designed the hotel using a classical Italian Renaissance Revival architectural style. Construction costs totaled $158,000. It was named for the mother of its builder, entrepreneur John Whitelaw Lewis who also founded Industrial Savings Bank.

It was completely financed and built by African American entrepreneurs, investors, designers, and craftsmen as a place of meeting and public accommodation for prominent African Americans during segregation. The hotel was listed in Victor Green's Green Book, a guide for African American travelers. Entertainers, such as Cab Calloway, who performed on U Street stayed at the Whitelaw as well as other African Americans who came to Washington for meetings of national black organizations and could not stay in the city's other hotels. Its large public spaces allowed the Whitelaw to become an important social center.

The end of legal Segregation in the United States and the rise in drugs in the neighborhood led to the decline of the Whitelaw. It was closed by the city in 1977 and was slated for demolition. Manna, Inc bought the building in 1991 and used historic tax credits to renovate it into low- and moderate-income housing. It re-opened in 1992.
