= City National Bank (New Jersey) =

Defunct American bank

City National Bank of New Jersey
- Type: Private
- Industry: Retail and commercial banking
- Genre: Banking
- Founded: 1972
- Founder: Charles Whigham
- Defunct: November 1, 2019; 6 years ago
- Fate: Bank failure; assets acquired by Industrial Bank (Washington D.C.)
- Headquarters: 900 Broad Street; Newark, New Jersey
- Number of locations: Three in Greater New York
- Net income: ($3,677,000) (As of 12/31/11)
- Total assets: $358,442,000 (As of 12/31/11)
- Owner: City National Bancshares
- Number of employees: 86 (As of 12/31/11)
- Website: CityNatBank.com

City National Bank was a regional bank headquartered in Newark, New Jersey with four branches in the New York metropolitan area. According to the June 2011 issue of Black Enterprise magazine, it was the seventh largest African-American owned and operated commercial bank in the United States.

As of January 2018, the bank had 3 branches, down from a peak of 9 in 2009: 2 in New Jersey and 1 in Harlem.

On Friday, November 1, 2019, City National Bank of New Jersey was closed by the Office of the Comptroller of the Currency. The FDIC was named receiver. Industrial Bank, a similar Black-owned bank headquartered in Washington D.C., acquired all deposit accounts and essentially all assets.
