= Southern Aid Society–Dunbar Theater Building =

- Southern Aid Society Building–Dunbar Theater
- U.S. National Register of Historic Places
- U.S. Historic district – Contributing property
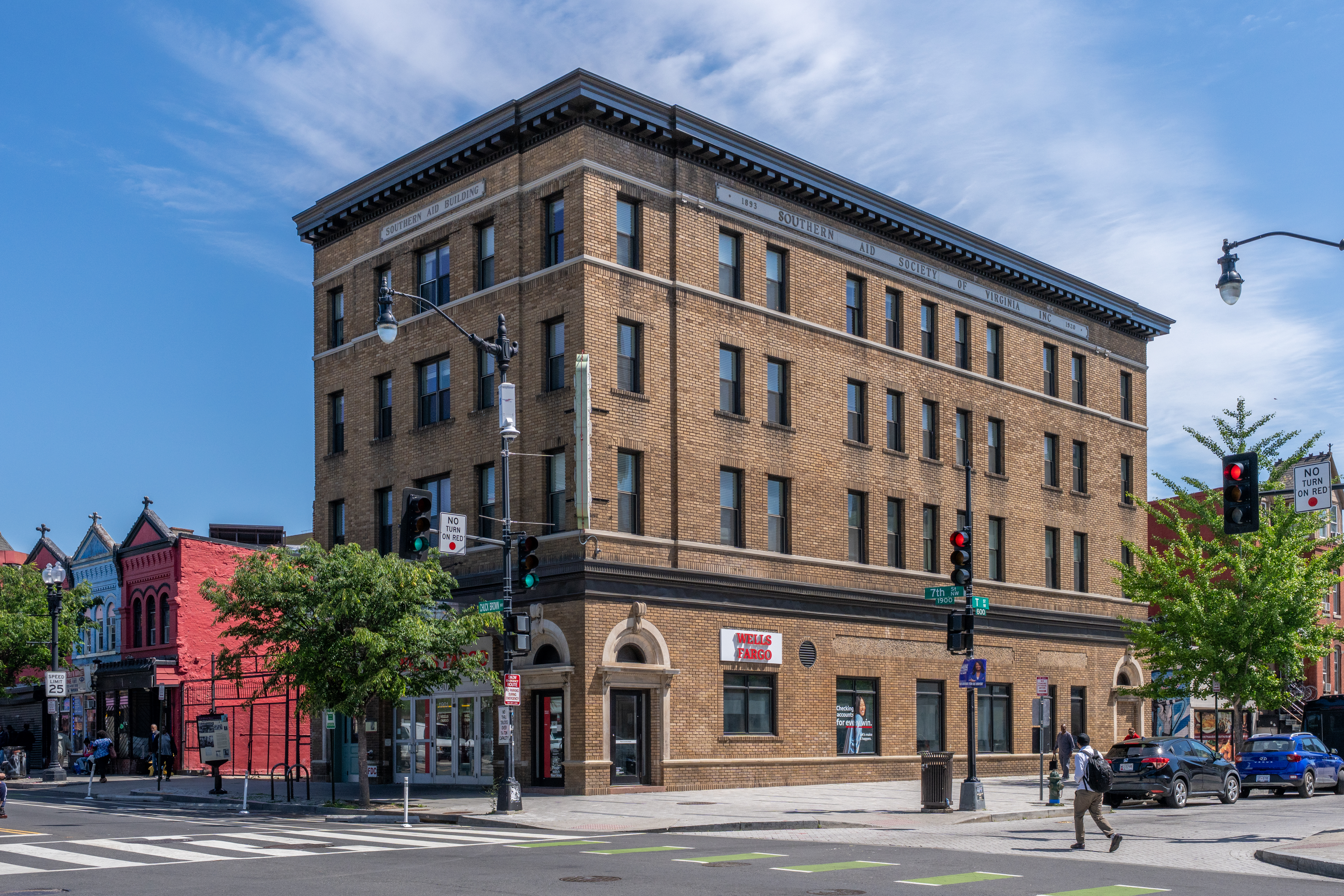
- Dunbar Theater Building in 2026

- Location within Washington, D.C.
- Location: 1901-1903 7th St. NW; Washington, D.C.
- Coordinates: 38°54′56″N 77°1′19″W
- Built: 1921
- Architect: Isaiah T. Hatton; Reginald W. Geare (theater)
- Part of: Greater U Street Historic District (ID93001129)
- NRHP reference No.: 86003071
- Added to NRHP: November 6, 1986

The Southern Aid Society Building–Dunbar Theater is an historic structure located in the Shaw neighborhood of Washington, D.C. The building was designed by architect Isaiah T. Hatton. Reginald W. Geare designed the theater portion of the building. It was completed in 1921. It has been listed on the District of Columbia Inventory of Historic Sites since 1984 and it was listed on the National Register of Historic Places in 1986. It is a contributing property in the Greater U Street Historic District.

== See also ==
- Southern Aid and Insurance Company
