= Industrial Bank (Washington D.C.) =

Bank based in Washington D.C.

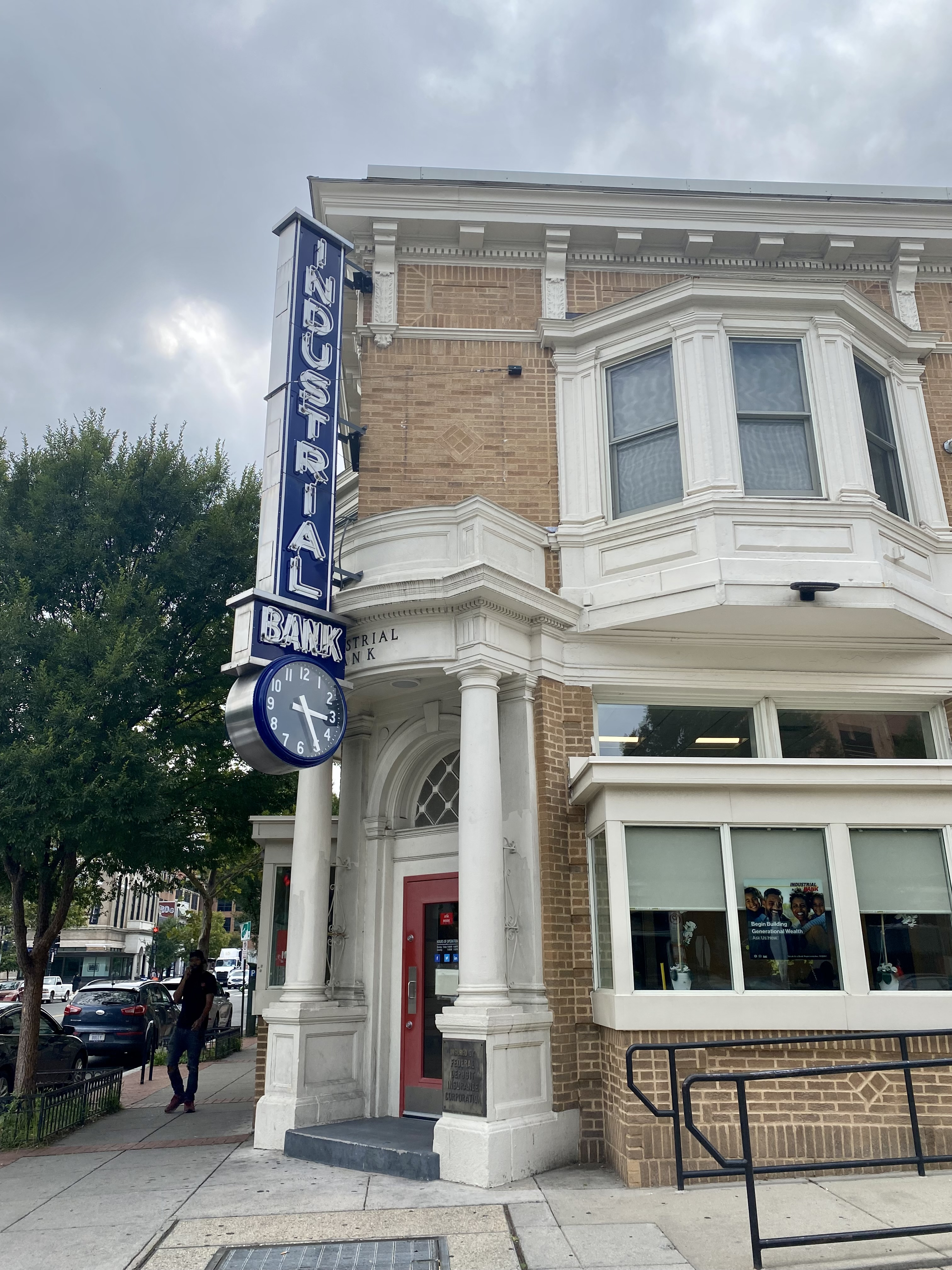
- Industrial Bank's U Street Banking Center at 2000 11th Street NW. It is the bank's oldest existing branch, designed by Isaiah Hatton a few years after the bank's founding in 1913.
- Type: Limited Liability Company
- Industry: Banking
- Founded: 1913; 113 years ago as Industrial Savings Bank
- Headquarters: Washington, D.C., United States
- Products: Retail banking
- Website: www.industrial-bank.com

Industrial Bank is a historic African American-owned bank based in Washington, D.C., United States. Industrial Bank has 9 branches: four in D.C., 11th and U, Georgia Avenue, J.H. Mitchell, Anacostia Gateway; Two branches in Maryland; Oxon Hill, Forestville (coming soon to Largo, MD), two in Newark, NJ and a branch in Harlem, NY.

== History ==
It was established in 1913 as the Industrial Savings Bank by John Whitelaw Lewis and originally operated out of the Laborers' Building and Loan Association building designed by William Sidney Pittman. An Industrial Bank building on U Street was designed by Isaiah Hatton a few years later.

The bank closed in 1932 but was reorganized and reopened by Howard University alumnus Jesse Mitchell in 1934. By 1947 the bank had $6 million in assets from over 14,000 depositors, more than 20% of whom were white. This made it the largest black-owned bank in the U.S. The bank faced staffing difficulties because trained white bank workers were unwilling to work for a black bank, but DC only had a single bank training institute, and that institute had a whites-only policy.

In 2013 the Congressional Black Caucus Foundation invested $1 million in certificates of deposit at the bank to spur lending to the African American community. The number of African American banks fell during the Great Recession and Industrial Bank was the last African American-owned bank in Washington D.C.

On Friday, November 1, 2019, Industrial Bank acquired substantially all assets of New Jersey's insolvent City National Bank.
