= Deborah Willis (academic) =

New Zealand professor of education

Academic background
- Education: University of Canterbury, Victoria University of Wellington
- Theses: A developmental investigation of the effects of active participation and self determination in memory performance (1978); Involvement in Academic Study: an Investigation of the Nature, Effects and Development of Involvement in University Courses (1989)
- Doctoral advisor: Gerald Rupert Grace, John Campbell Clift

Deborah Margery Willis is a New Zealand academic, and is professor emerita of education at Victoria University of Wellington. She was previously Pro Vice Chancellor and Dean of Humanities and Social Sciences, and Pro Vice Chancellor of education at the university, and sits on the board of the Academic Quality Agency for New Zealand Universities.

== Academic career ==
Willis completed a master's degree titled A developmental investigation of the effects of active participation and self determination in memory performance at the University of Canterbury, followed by a PhD at Victoria in 1989. Willis then joined the faculty of the Victoria University of Wellington, rising to full professor. Willis lectured in the School of Education and was Director of the Teaching Development Centre. She specialised in evaluation, learning assessment and curriculum.

Willis was appointed Assistant Vice-Chancellor (Academic) in 2003, and then Pro Vice Chancellor and Dean of humanities and social sciences in February 2004. She was also Pro Vice Chancellor of the Faculty of Education. She remained in the role until 2014, when she was replaced by Jennifer Windsor. Willis was acting Dean of the Waikato University Management School in 2016.

Willis is a member of the board of the Academic Quality Agency for the organisation New Zealand Universities. She was a member of the inaugural committee for the national tertiary education awards, known as Ako Aotearoa. In 2005 she chaired the Teaching Matters Forum, a Government appointment, and served for six years as New Zealand's representative to the Grants Committee of the University of the South Pacific.
