= The Exhibit of American Negroes =

Display at 1900 World's Fair in Paris

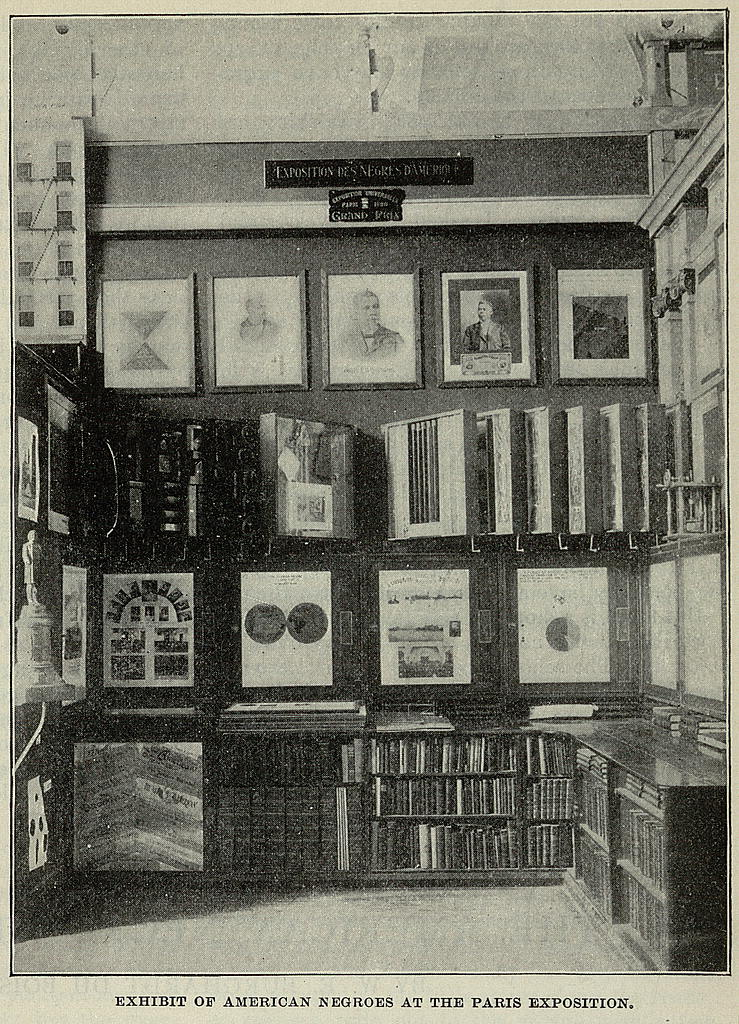
Photograph of the Exhibit of the American Negroes at the Paris Exposition, 1900

The Exhibit of American Negroes was a sociological display within the Palace of Social Economy at the 1900 World's Fair in Paris. The exhibit was a joint effort between Daniel Murray, the Assistant Librarian of Congress, Thomas J. Calloway, a lawyer and the primary organizer of the exhibit, and W. E. B. Du Bois. The goal of the exhibition was to demonstrate progress and commemorate the lives of African Americans at the turn of the century.

The exhibit included a statuette of Frederick Douglass, four bound volumes of nearly 400 official patents by African Americans, photographs from several educational institutions (Fisk University, Howard University, Roger Williams University, Tuskegee Institute, Claflin University, Berea College, North Carolina A&T), an African-American bibliography by the Library of Congress containing 1,400 titles, and two social studies directed by W. E. B. Du Bois: "The Georgia Negro" (comprising 32 handmade graphs and charts), and a set of about 30 statistical graphics on the African-American population made by Du Bois's students at Atlanta University. Most memorably, the exhibit displayed some five hundred photographs of African-American men and women, homes, churches, businesses and landscapes including photographs from Thomas E. Askew.

== Founding ==
Thomas Junius Calloway, an African-American lawyer and educator, sent a letter to over one hundred African-American representatives in various sections of the United States, including Booker T. Washington, to solicit help in advocating for an exhibit to present at the world's fair in Paris. The letter insists that, "thousands upon thousands will go [to the fair], and a well selected and prepared exhibit, representing the Negro's development in his churches, his schools, his homes, his farms, his stores, his professions and pursuits in general will attract attention... and do a great and lasting good in convincing thinking people of the possibilities of the Negro." Washington appealed personally to President William McKinley and just four months before the opening of the Paris Exposition, Congress allocated $15,000 to fund the exhibit. Calloway enlisted Du Bois, with whom he had formerly been classmates at Fisk, and Daniel Murray, Assistant to the Librarian of Congress, to assemble materials.

Du Bois included photographs that he called "typical Negro faces," exemplifying the accomplishment and progress of African Americans. He compiled a set of three large albums of photographs, the photographer of which was never identified at the exhibit. Some were formal studio portraits, but there were also informal snapshots of groups of people, children playing in the streets, people working, family outings, images of houses and businesses and the interiors of homes.

The exhibit was separate from United States national building, within the shared space of the Palace of Social Economy and Congresses with maps detailing U.S. resources, New York City tenement models, and information on labor unions, railroad pensions and libraries. It was displayed from April to November 1900 and over 50 million people passed through.

Mainstream American newspapers generally ignored the existence of the Negro Exhibit, and the U.S. commissioner-general failed to mention the Negro Exhibit in his comprehensive article published in the North American Review. Still, the Negro Exhibit occupied one fourth of the total exhibition space allocated to the US in the multinational Palace of Social Economy and Congresses, and Black periodicals like The Colored American wrote extensively about the project.

Current location

Today the Exhibit of American Negroes is housed at the Library of Congress.

== Context ==
=== Influence of the 1889 "Exposition Universelle" ===
During the 1889 Paris Exposition eleven years prior, buildings were built to represent different counties during the World Fair, and these buildings representing nations mostly occupied a site on the Champs de Mars. This was except for French colonies, which were placed on a separate, smaller site, called Les Invalides. The smaller-site for these colonies entailed not only architectural displays, but also constructed villages inhabited by people from these colonies, depicted living "in huts like savages" which made the often-unwilling participants feel "very humiliated to be treated this way." This was because, as the Senegalese jeweler named Samba Lawbé Thiam phrased it after having been in the exhibition himself, "in Sénégal... the Bureau of Hygiene does not tolerate the construction of this type of hovel."

The widespread nature of the inaccurate and racist views displayed in the 1889 Paris Exposition, being prevalent in French society enough for these views to be received positively by millions of the French public, were part of why it was so imperative that the makers of the Exhibit of American Negroes display people of their skin-color positively—and on their own terms. In showing Black people in the United States in the same dress, settings, professions, etc. as the white audience, they hoped to potentially counter beliefs regarding the inferiority of people with darker skin.

=== African Americans in France ===
As the Exhibit of American Negroes was a part of the World Fair's sensationalized exhibition to over 50 million passerby in Paris, it is more than likely that this display of the equal status of Black people in America contributed to the documented disparity in treatment of Black Americans and Black Africans in metropolitan France.

A range of Black Americans, from James Baldwin to Angela Davis to the Harlem Hellfighters, have spoken about their relatively positive experience in France as a sort of "reprieve from the racial discrimination." This is in contrast to the experiences of many other Black people in France, oftentimes from Francophone former colonies, whom continue to experience racism because they are not viewed as positively as Black Americans, most likely due to their identity's different historical relationship with France.

The Exhibition of American Negroes was a key development in causing much of the French populace, but especially Parisians, to have more positive racial views of African-Americans than the racial views they have towards many other people of African descent (e.g. North African Black people).

These contrasted views have continued to be prevalent in many places, and racism is often seen as a non-present issue in France by many French people, despite evidence to the contrary. This may be explained by the French government's repeated insistence, historically and today, that Republican universalism and France's abolition of slavery (which would take over fifty more years to also be applied inalienably to France's colonies) have largely eliminated "race" as a source of discrimination in France even with evidence to the contrary.

== See also ==
- Lincoln Jubilee
