= Martin Dam =

- Location of Martin Dam in Alabama
- Country: United States
- Location: Elmore / Tallapoosa counties, near Dadeville, Alabama
- Coordinates: 32°40′49″N 85°54′39″W
- Construction began: 1923
- Opening date: 1926

Dam and spillways
- Type of dam: Concrete arch-gravity
- Impounds: Tallapoosa River
- Height: 168 ft (51 m)
- Length: 2,000 ft (610 m)
- Dam volume: 431,000 yd^{3} (330,000 m^{3})
- Spillways: 20x gated overflow
- Spillway capacity: 134,000 cu ft/s (3,800 m^{3}/s)

Reservoir
- Creates: Lake Martin
- Total capacity: 1,622,000 acre⋅ft (2.001×10^{9} m^{3})
- Catchment area: 2,984 mi^{2} (7,730 km^{2})
- Surface area: 39,180 acres (15,860 ha)
- Normal elevation: 490 ft (150 m) (max)

Power Station
- Hydraulic head: 145 ft (44 m)
- Turbines: 4x Francis
- Installed capacity: 182.5 MW
- Annual generation: 327 million KWh

Alabama Register of Landmarks and Heritage
- Designated: January 5, 1976

Martin Dam is a concrete arch gravity dam on the Tallapoosa River in Alabama in the United States, about 10 miles (16 km) southwest of Dadeville. Impounding the 40,000-acre (16,000 ha) Lake Martin, the dam was built in the 1920s to provide flood control, hydroelectric power generation and water supply. Originally known as the Cherokee Bluffs dam, the dam is named in honor of Thomas Wesley Martin, president of the Alabama Power Company during the dam's construction. The African American community of Kowaliga (Benson) was submerged by Lake Martin as well as Sousanna and historic Native American sites.

Preparations for construction of Martin Dam began in 1916 as Alabama Power began to purchase lands that would be flooded by its construction. Actual work on the dam commenced in 1923 and was completed in 1926; the lake filled to capacity for the first time on April 23, 1928 after heavy upstream flooding. However, the dam was not officially dedicated until 1936. At the time of completion, Lake Martin was the largest man-made body of water in the world.

The dam is 168 feet (51 m) high and 2,000 feet (610 m) long, straddling the border of Tallapoosa and Elmore Counties with the powerhouse located on the Elmore (west) side. The spillway is controlled by twenty 30 ft (9.1 m) x 16 ft (4.9 m) gates and has a total discharge capacity of 134,000 cubic feet per second (3,800 m^{3}/s). At its full capacity of 1,622,000 acre⋅ft (2.001×10^{9} m^{3}), Lake Martin stretches over 30 miles (48 km) up the Tallapoosa River. The lake is drawn down by an average of 10 feet (3.0 m) each winter to facilitate flood control operations at Martin Dam.

Martin Dam's powerhouse contained three Francis turbines upon its original construction in 1927, with capacities of 45.8, 41 and 40.5 megawatts (MW). A fourth generator with a capacity of 55.2 MW was incorporated in 1952, bringing the total generating capacity to 182.5 MW. The power plant generates over 327 million KWh each year.

== See also ==
- List of largest reservoirs in the United States
- List of reservoirs and dams in Alabama
