= Kowaliga School =

School in Kowaliga, Alabama, U.S. (c. 1895–c. 1925)

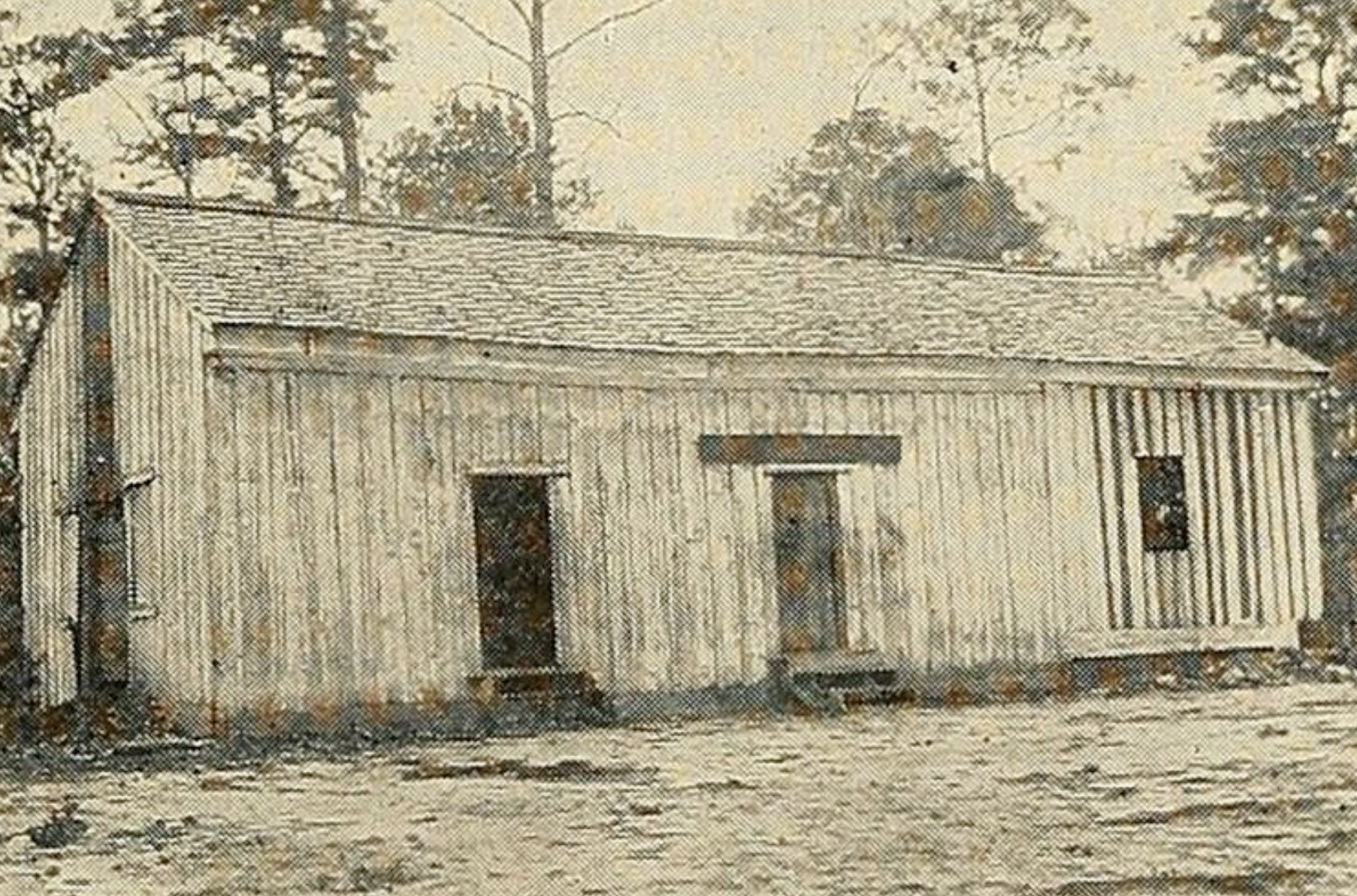
- Kowaliga Academy and Industrial Institute campus building, c. 1913 – c. 1916
- Kowaliga, Alabama, U.S

Information
- Former names: Kowaliga Academy and Industrial Institute, Kowaliga Academic and Industrial Institute, Kowaliga Industrial School, Kowaliga Institute
- Established: c. 1895
- Founders: William E. Benson
- Closed: c. 1925
- President: William E. Benson
- Affiliation: American Missionary Association

Kowaliga School was a segregated industrial school for African American students in Kowaliga, Alabama, U.S.. The school was founded on 10 acres (4.0 ha) of John Jackson Benson's farmland, by his son William E. Benson. The creation of the school informed the creation of the unincorporated village of Kowaliga. The school has also been named the Kowaliga Academy and Industrial Institute, Kowaliga Academic and Industrial Institute, Kowaliga Industrial School, and the Kowaliga Institute. During the era of segregation in the United States, African Americans were mostly restricted from attending schools, public venues, and public transportation with White people.

== History ==
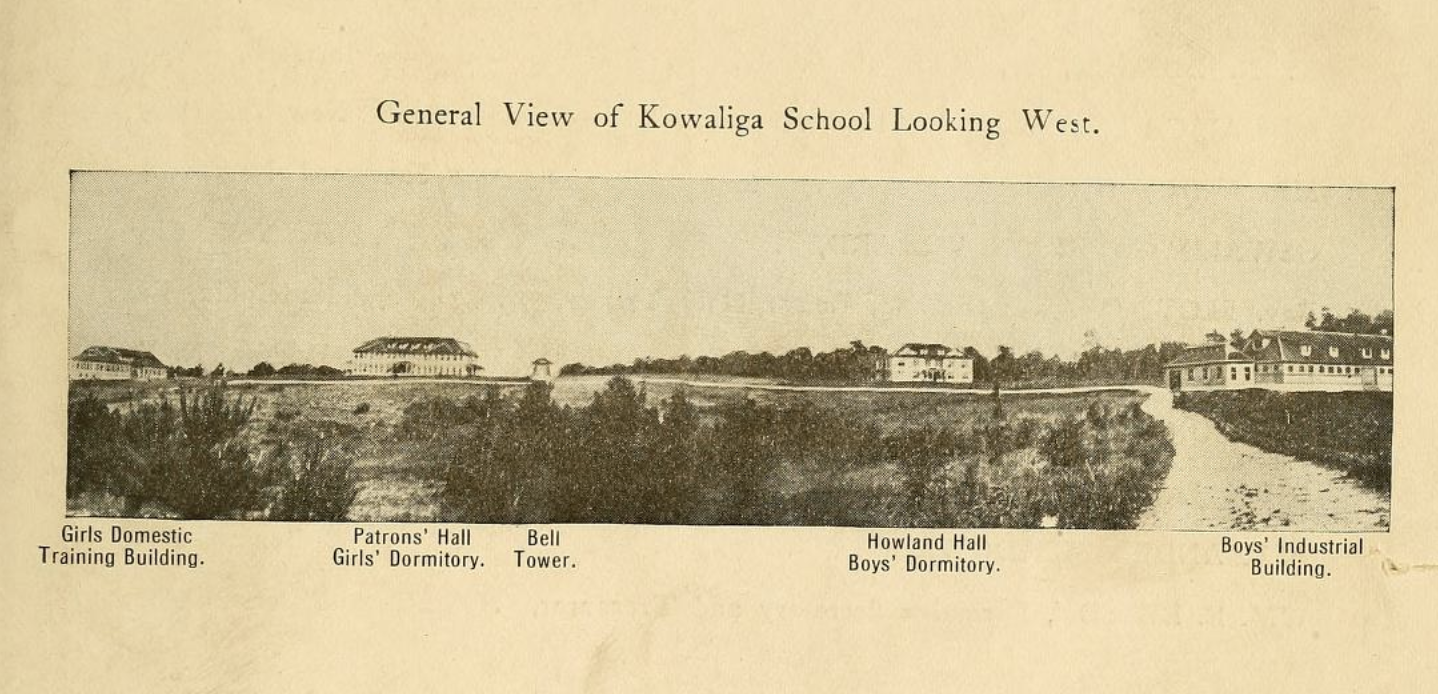
General view of Kowaliga Academic and Industrial Institute

The goal in the school creation was for rural students to eventually find industrial work with their new experiences, or alternatively create an educational foundation for these students in order to continue their education at other institutions afterwards. The Kowaliga Academy and Industrial Institute was established in roughly 1895, the first building cornerstone was laid in August 1896, and the school was incorporated in c. 1898. Some of the funding for the school came from the American Missionary Association.

In February 1909, the school experienced a fire.

In 1900, William E. Benson serving as the founding president added to the Dixie Industrial Company, an industry centered company designed to put his former students to work locally. The company initially included a modern sawmill, a large turpentine distillery, and a cotton ginnery. The Dixie Industrial Company farming was spread over 10,000 acres. The Dixie Industrial Company closed in 1916.

The school operated for over 30 years and educated hundreds of children, and eventually closed around 1925.
