= Thomas J. Calloway =

African-American journalist, educator and lawyer

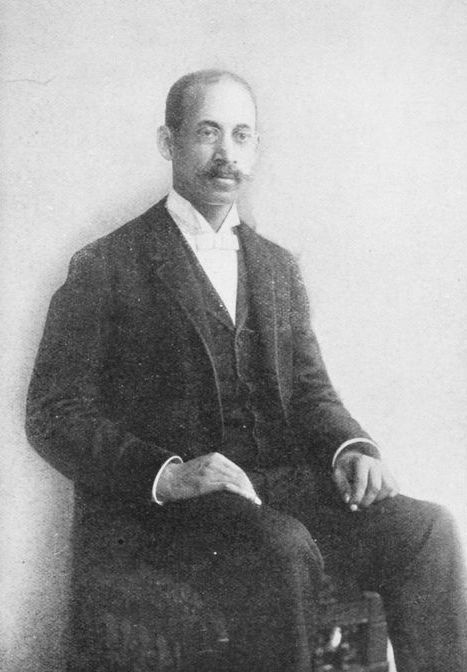
Thomas J. Calloway c. 1900

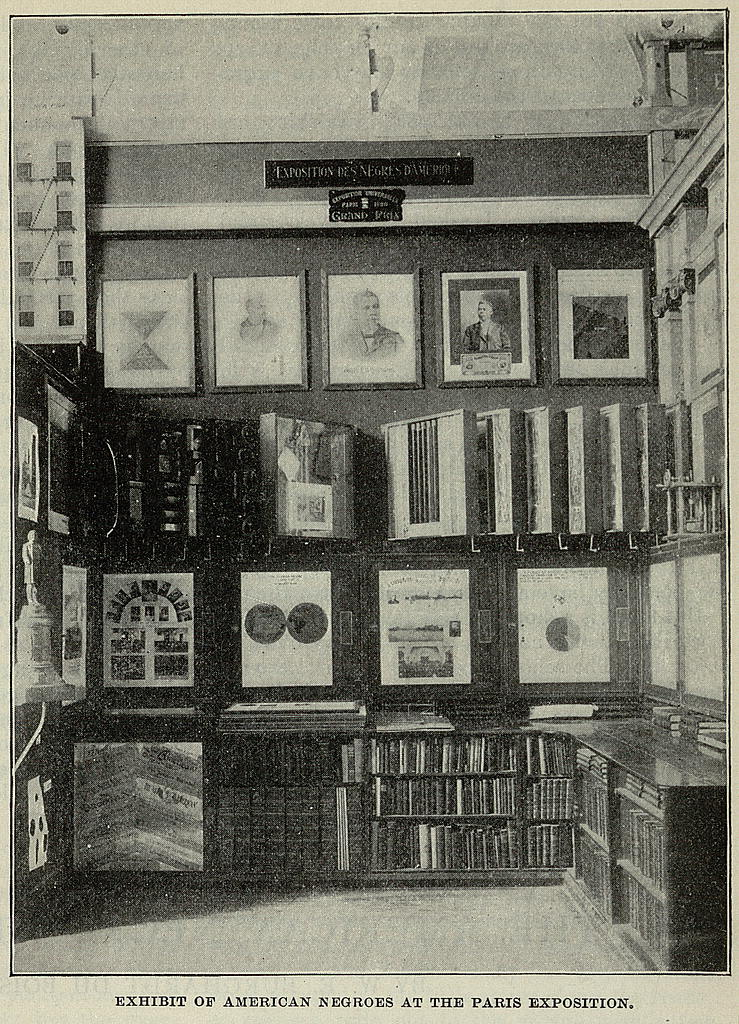
Exhibit of the American Negroes at the Paris exposition, 1900, organised by Thomas J. Calloway

Thomas Junius Calloway (August 12, 1866–May 19, 1930) was an African-American journalist, educator and lawyer. He was born in Cleveland, Tennessee, the fifth of seven children.

Calloway graduated from Fisk University in 1889 and was an undergraduate classmate of W. E. B. Du Bois. He attended law school at Howard University, earning a law degree in 1904. While attending law school, he worked as a clerk at the War Department.

Calloway taught English at a high school in Evansville, Indiana, and served as principal of the Helena (Arkansas) Normal School, president of Alcorn Agricultural and Mechanical College in Mississippi, and assistant principal to Booker T. Washington at the Tuskegee Institute (now known as Tuskegee University).

Two of Calloway's brothers also worked for the Tuskegee Institute. His older brother, James Nathan Calloway, was a lecturer in mathematics and agriculture, and worked as an agent and lobbyist for the Institute. His younger brother Clinton J. Calloway was head of the Institute’s extension department, working to establish schools for African American children in rural communities across the South.

Calloway was appointed U.S. Special Commissioner in charge of The Exhibit of American Negroes at the United States pavilion at the Exposition Universelle (World's Fair) held in Paris in 1900. He collaborated with Daniel Murray, the Assistant Librarian of Congress, and W. E. B. Du Bois, to create the sociological display; the goal was to demonstrate progress and commemorate the lives of African Americans at the turn of the century.

The Thomas J. Calloway House, in Lanham, Maryland, is listed in the National Register of Historic Places.
