= Shaw =

Shaw may refer to:

== Places ==
=== Australia ===
- Shaw, Queensland

=== Canada ===
- Shaw Street, a street in Toronto

=== England ===
- Shaw, Berkshire, a village
- Shaw, Greater Manchester, a location in the parish of Shaw and Crompton
- Shaw (Swindon ward), Wiltshire
- Shaw, Melksham Without, Wiltshire

=== Philippines ===
- Shaw Boulevard, a major thoroughfare in Metro Manila
  - Shaw Boulevard station, a station of the MRT-3

=== United States ===
- Shaw, Kansas, an unincorporated community
- Shaw, Mississippi, a city
- Mount Shaw, a summit in the Ossipee Mountains of New Hampshire
- Shaw Creek (Ohio), a stream in Ohio
- Shaw, Tennessee, now known as Burwood, Tennessee
- Shaw, West Virginia, a ghost town
- Shaw, Washington, D.C., a neighborhood
- Shaw, St. Louis, Missouri, a neighborhood
- Shaw Air Force Base, US Air Force base in South Carolina

== People ==
- Shaw (name), people with "Shaw" as given name or surname
- Shao, Chinese surname, also spelled "Shaw"
- Clan Shaw of Tordarroch, a Scottish clan

== Education ==
- Shaw Academy, an Irish online training and higher education institution
- Shaw High School (disambiguation)
  - Shaw Junior High School, listed on the National Register of Historic Places in Washington, D.C.
- Shaw College (disambiguation)
  - Shaw College (Hong Kong), a college of the Chinese University of Hong Kong
  - Shaw College of Detroit, a former college
- Shaw University (est. 1865), an American historically black college in Raleigh, North Carolina

== Entertainment ==
- Shaw Family, a fictional crime/spy family from Fast&Furious, see List of The Fast and the Furious characters
- Shaw Brothers Studio (1958–2011), formerly the largest film production company in Hong Kong
- Shaw Organisation (est. 1924), a Singapore film distributor and chain of movie theatres
- Shaw Festival (est. 1962), a Canadian theatre festival
- Astro Shaw (est. 2005), the largest film production, distribution and marketing in Malaysia

== Organizations ==
- D. E. Shaw & Co. (est. 1988), an American hedge fund, private equity and technology development firm
- Shaw Communications (1966–2023), Canadian telecommunications company, based in Calgary
- ShawCor (est. 1930s), a global energy services firm based in Houston, Texas
- The Shaw Group (est. 1987), a diversified American Fortune 500 corporation (now acquired by CB&I)
- Shaw Industries (est. 1946), an American flooring manufacturer
- Shaw Media (United States), an American newspaper publisher
- Shaws Department Stores, an Irish department store chain
- Shaw's and Star Market, an American grocery group

== Other uses ==
- Shaw (woodland), a strip of woodland, usually separating fields or lining a road
- Shaw alphabet, another name for the Shavian alphabet, an alternative for the Latin alphabet for the English language
- A common onomatopoeia of one of Hornet's voice lines in the indie metroidvania game Hollow Knight.

== See also ==
- Shaw Landing, Wisconsin, an unincorporated community
- Shaw Park, a baseball stadium in Winnipeg, Canada
- Shaw Tower (disambiguation)
- Justice Shaw (disambiguation)
- Shawe (disambiguation)
- Zzxjoanw
