= Weddington =

Weddington may refer to:

== People ==
- Elaine Weddington Steward (born Elaine Weddington, c. 1964), American lawyer
- Mike Weddington (born 1960), American gridiron football player
- Reuben C. Weddington, American educator and politician in Arkansas
- Sarah Weddington (1945–2021), American attorney in the Roe vs. Wade case
- Susan Weddington (1951–2020), American businesswoman and political figure in Texas
- Wilson Weddington (1847–1923), landowner in early Los Angeles
- W. Carlton Weddington (born 1970), a former Ohio state legislator convicted of bribery in 2012

== Places ==
=== United Kingdom ===
- Weddington, Kent, a location in England
- Weddington, Warwickshire, an area of Nuneaton, Warwickshire, England

=== United States ===
- Weddington, Arkansas, an unincorporated community in Washington County
- Weddington, North Carolina, a town in Union County

== Other uses ==
- Weddington Castle, a manor house formerly located in Nuneaton, Warwickshire, England
- Weddington High School, in North Carolina, U.S.
- "Weddington Street", a song by Frank Gambale from his 1985 album Brave New Guitar
