= Shaw High School =

Shaw High School can refer to:

- Shaw High School (Georgia) in Columbus
- Shaw High School (Mississippi) (previously McEvans Warriors K-12 School) in Shaw, Mississippi
- Shaw High School (Ohio) in East Cleveland
- Archbishop Shaw High School in New Orleans, Louisiana
- John Shaw High School in Mobile County Public School System, Alabama

== See also ==
- Shaw Junior High School, listed on the National Register of Historic Places in Washington, D.C.
- Shaw (disambiguation)
