= Mike Davis (basketball, born 1956) =

American basketball player

Personal information
- Born: August 2, 1956 (age 70) Jacksonville, Florida, U.S.
- Listed height: 6 ft 10 in (2.08 m)
- Listed weight: 230 lb (104 kg)

Career information
- High school: Bishop Mose Davis (Jacksonville, Florida)
- College: Shaw College (1974–1975); Mercer County CC (1975–1976); Maryland (1976–1978)
- NBA draft: 1978: undrafted
- Playing career: 1978–1991
- Position: Center
- Number: 26

Career history
- 1978–1981: Bancoroma Roma
- 1981–1982: Seleco Napoli
- 1982: New York Knicks
- 1982–1983: Albany Patroons
- 1983: New York Knicks
- 1983–1985: Barcelona
- 1985–1986: Limoges
- 1986–1987: Fantoni Udine
- 1987–1988: Benetton Treviso
- 1988–1989: Annabella Pavia
- 1989–1991: Grupo IFA Granollers

Career highlights
- European Cup Winners' Cup (1985); Club World Cup (1985); All-CBA First Team (1983); CBA All-Defensive Second Team (1983); CBA Newcomer of the Year (1983); NJCAA All-American (1976)
- Stats at NBA.com
- Stats at Basketball Reference

Michael Anthony Davis (born August 2, 1956) is an American former professional basketball player. Playing as a center, his career mostly took place in Italy and Spain, though he had a short stint in the National Basketball Association (NBA).

== College career ==
Born and raised in Jacksonville, Florida, Davis did not play high-school basketball, as he didn't make his school's team in 11th grade. However, after growing to 6-10, he took up the sport again. He moved to Shaw College, Detroit, in 1974, living in Dave Bing's house.

As a sophomore, he played for Mercer County Community College, earning National Junior College Athletic Association All-American honours.

Davis then moved to Maryland, playing in the Atlantic Coast Conference (ACC) of the NCAA Division I, in 1976. He was an ACC Rookie of the week in 1976–1977, also being noted for his play that season, only his third of competitive basketball. However, in January 1978, he was kicked off the squad by coach Lefty Driesell after disagreements between the two, he stayed on scholarship at Maryland.

== Professional career ==
Going undrafted in 1978, Davis moved to the Italian Serie A where he would stay four years. Returning to the US in 1982, he joined the New York Knicks, played in the summer league and exhibition games but was cut just before the season began.

The center then joined Continental Basketball Association side Albany Patroons. He averaged 16.5 points, 10.5 rebounds (a league second best) per game with the Patroons. Davis was selected as the CBA Newcomer of the Year and named to the All-CBA First Team and All-Defensive Second Team. He was re-signed by the Knicks on 23 February 1983 on a 10-day contract to replace the injured Vince Taylor. He did not play during that period, nor when he signed a new 10-day contract but was finally signed to a permanent contract in March 1983 until the end of the season. Davis scored 5 points in six minutes on his NBA debut, he would play in 8 games, averaging 1.8 points, 1.3 rebounds and 0.5 blocks in 3.5 minutes per game.

After being released by the Knicks at the end of the season, he returned to Europe, this time with Spanish Liga ACB side Barcelona in 1983. With the Spaniards he would win the 1985 European Cup Winners' Cup and the 1985 Club World Cup.

== Career statistics ==
Legend
GP	Games played	GS	Games started	MPG	Minutes per game
FG%	Field goal percentage	3P%	3-point field goal percentage	FT%	Free throw percentage
RPG	Rebounds per game	APG	Assists per game	SPG	Steals per game
BPG	Blocks per game	PPG	Points per game	**Bold**	Career high

=== NBA ===
==== Regular season ====
Year	Team	GP	GS	MPG	FG%	3P%	FT%	RPG	APG	SPG	BPG	PPG
1982–83	New York	8	0	3.5	.400	–	.600	1.3	.0	.0	.5	1.8

==== Playoffs ====
Year	Team	GP	MPG	FG%	3P%	FT%	RPG	APG	SPG	BPG	PPG
1983	New York	1	1.0	–	–	–	.0	.0	.0	.0	.0
