= Shawe =

Shawe is a surname. Notable people with the surname include:

- Bonnie Lythgoe (born 1949), née Shawe, British dancer and theatre producer and director
- Charles Shawe (1878–1951), English cricketer
- John Shawe (disambiguation)
- Phillip Shawe (1889–1945), Australian cricketer
- Philip R. Shawe (born 1969), American businessman
- Richard Shawe (fl. 1370s–1410s), a canon of Windsor from 1376 to 1403
- Robert Shawe (c. 1699–1752), Irish academic and clergyman

== See also ==
- Shaw (disambiguation)
