= Shaw College =

Shaw College may refer to:

- Shaw College (Hong Kong), a part of the Chinese University of Hong Kong, in New Territories, Hong Kong
- Shaw College at Detroit, a former college in Detroit, Michigan, United States
- Shaw College, a former name of Rust College, Holly Springs, Mississippi, United States

== See also ==
- Shaw University, Raleigh, NC, USA
- Shaw (disambiguation)
