= Frederic Waldock =

English cricketer (1898–1959)

Personal information
- Full name: Frederic Alexander Waldock
- Born: 16 March 1898; Colombo, Sri Lanka
- Died: 4 July 1959 (aged 61); Taunton, Somerset, England
- Batting: Left-handed
- Bowling: Left-arm orthodox spin
- Role: Batsman
- Relatives: Brother, Harold

Domestic team information
- Years: Team
- 1919–1920: Oxford University
- 1920–1924: Somerset
- First-class debut: 12 May 1919 Oxford University v Gentlemen of England
- Last First-class: 18 February 1934 Ceylon v Marylebone Cricket Club

Career statistics
Competition	First-class
Matches	40
Runs scored	1634
Batting average	23.01
100s/50s	0/9
Top score	85
Balls bowled	1677
Wickets	24
Bowling average	38.50
5 wickets in innings	1
10 wickets in match	0
Best bowling	7/46
Catches/stumpings	22/–
- Source: CricketArchive, 27 September 2010

Frederic Alexander Waldock (16 March 1898 – 4 July 1959) played first-class cricket for Oxford University and Somerset between 1919 and 1924, and then for representative sides in his native Sri Lanka between 1927 and 1934. He was born at Colombo, Sri Lanka (then known as Ceylon) and died at Galmington, Taunton, Somerset.

Waldock was educated at Uppingham School and from 1918 was at Hertford College, Oxford. As a cricketer, he was a left-handed middle-order batsman and a slow left-arm orthodox spin bowler. With county cricket resuming after the First World War in a fairly ad hoc manner in the 1919 season, Oxford University's first-class fixtures that year were largely against scratch teams of amateur cricketers, and Waldock was a regular player for the university side throughout. In the match against the Marylebone Cricket Club (MCC) at Oxford, he made 85, and this would remain the highest score of his first-class career. The game just before the 1919 University Match was against a side raised by H. D. G. Leveson Gower at Eastbourne; Waldock took seven first-innings wickets for 46 runs and then scored 80 of a first-wicket partnership of 166 with Miles Howell. Waldock was awarded his cricket blue and was also elected secretary for the 1920 Oxford season; in its notes on the 1919 Oxford season, Wisden Cricketers' Almanack said that "Waldock did so well... that people began to talk about him as the coming left-hand bat".

In the 1919–20 rugby union season, Waldock was awarded his Oxford blue as well; he played at fly-half.

The 1920 cricket season saw Waldock as an established member of the Oxford University cricket team and as secretary the expectation was that he would go on to captain the team in 1921. That did not happen because Waldock left the university at the end of the summer 1920 term. The 1920 Oxford team was very strong in both batting and fielding. Waldock was singled out in the season report in Wisden for his fielding at mid-off, though it added that his batting was a "disappointment". His highest score for the university side was only 46 and with Reg Bettington and Greville Stevens in the team, his bowling was scarcely used at all.

After Oxford University had played Somerset in early June, however, Waldock played for Somerset in the county team's next match against Warwickshire at Bath. And when the university season was over in early July, he joined Somerset to the end of the season, and scored consistent runs for the team, with a highest of 78 in the match against Worcestershire at Worcester, where Wisden reported that he "found the batting form which had quite deserted him while he was playing for Oxford". In the 1920 season as a whole, Waldock made 849 runs at an average of 21.76; he did not bowl for Somerset.

After the 1920 season, Waldock did not return to Oxford and disappeared from first-class cricket for three years. He reappeared in four matches for Somerset at the start of the 1924 season, but those were his last games in English first-class cricket. For the next dozen years, he played for Sri Lankan side, appearing in a few first-class matches against touring teams from England and India. In his last recorded match, a one-day match against the MCC team that was heading for an Ashes series in Australia in 1936/37, he was captain of the Ceylon team.

Waldock's brother, Harold, was at Uppingham and Hertford College, Oxford with him and also won a rugby union blue. A younger brother, Humphrey, became a distinguished judge and was knighted.
