= Shaw Tower =

Shaw Tower or variation, may refer to:

- Shaw Tower (Vancouver), an office and residential complex in BC, Canada; regional HQ of Shaw Communications
- Shaw Monument, aka "Shaw Tower", in Preswick, South Ayrshire, Scotland
- Shaw Tower, Singapore, a building in Singapore of the Shaw Brothers company, see Shaw Organisation

== See also ==
- Shaw (disambiguation)
