= O Street Market =

- U.S. National Register of Historic Places
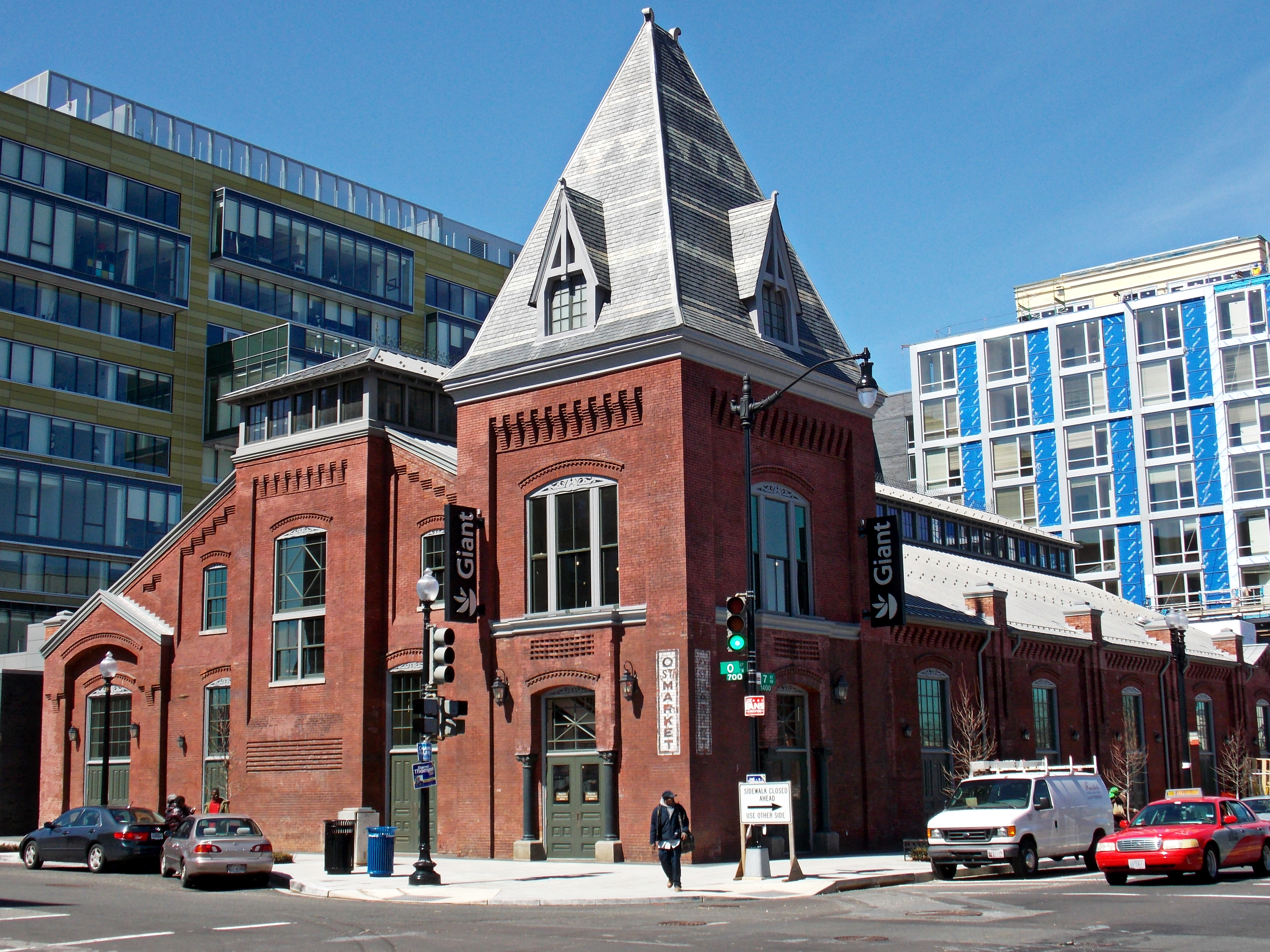
- O Street Market in 2014

- Location within Washington, D.C.
- Location: 1400 7th Street NW; Washington, D.C.
- Coordinates: 38°54′31.75″N 77°1′19.94″W
- Built: 1881
- Architectural style: Gothic Revival
- NRHP reference No.: 95000442
- Added to NRHP: April 28, 1995

O Street Market, also known as Northern Market, is a historic structure located at 1400 7th Street NW in the Shaw neighborhood of Washington, D.C. Built in 1881, it is one of three 19th-century public market buildings still standing in the city, along with Eastern Market and Georgetown Market. The market was listed on the District of Columbia Inventory of Historic Sites in 1968 and the National Register of Historic Places in 1995. The most distinctive architectural element of the Gothic Revival building is its corner tower on 7th and O Streets.

For decades, the market was a vital shopping destination for area residents. Following World War II, the market and surrounding neighborhood began to deteriorate. The building was slightly damaged during the 1968 Washington, D.C., riots, but was restored and reopened in 1980. Renovations were to begin in 2003, but in February of that year, the building's roof collapsed under snow following a historic blizzard. A decade later, the rehabilitated building reopened as part of a $325 million mixed-use development, City Market at O.

== History ==
=== 19th century ===
Following the Civil War, local government officials led by Board of Public Works head Alexander "Boss" Shepherd sought to change the image of Washington, D.C., as a small, unattractive city. Among the many improvements Shepherd planned was the replacement of the city's existing public markets with new, brick facilities in heavily populated neighborhoods. One of the older markets, Northern Liberties Market (Note: Sources also use the name "Northern Liberty Market".) at Mount Vernon Square, was razed in 1872. Many vendors refused to leave the market and several were killed during the demolition. With the help of businessmen, other vendors started the Northern Liberty Market Company (NLMC), which in 1875 opened a new public market at 5th and K Streets NW, in what is the present-day Mount Vernon Triangle neighborhood.

Shepherd nevertheless moved ahead with plans for a city-owned public market, and allocated land for the facility on the southwest corner of Square 446 (a city block bounded by 6th, 7th, O, and P Streets NW). As he did with many citywide improvement projects, Shepherd awarded contracts to businesses in which he owned large amounts of stock. After this corrupt practice was discovered, Shepherd was relieved of his post and many of the city projects he spearheaded were abandoned—including the new market.

The Northern Liberties Market struggled financially, as many residents found it too far from the commercial district on 7th Street. The NLMC sought to relocate, and in 1881 purchased the southwest corner of Square 422 (a city block bounded by 7th, 8th, O, and P Streets NW). Butcher Michael Hoover owned Square 422 in the early 1800s and sold it to printer Andrew Rothwell about 1845. Rothwell made many improvements to the property and added gardens which became popularly known as Rothwell's Gardens. The NLMC applied for building permits for a $15,000 ($500,431 in 2025 dollars), one-story brick building on May 31, 1881. The permit was signed by NLMC president Jesse B. Wilson. (Note: Like most of the NLMC's officers, Wilson was an investor in the company and not a merchant.) The new building was named O Street Market to avoid confusion with the company's other markets.

=== 20th century ===
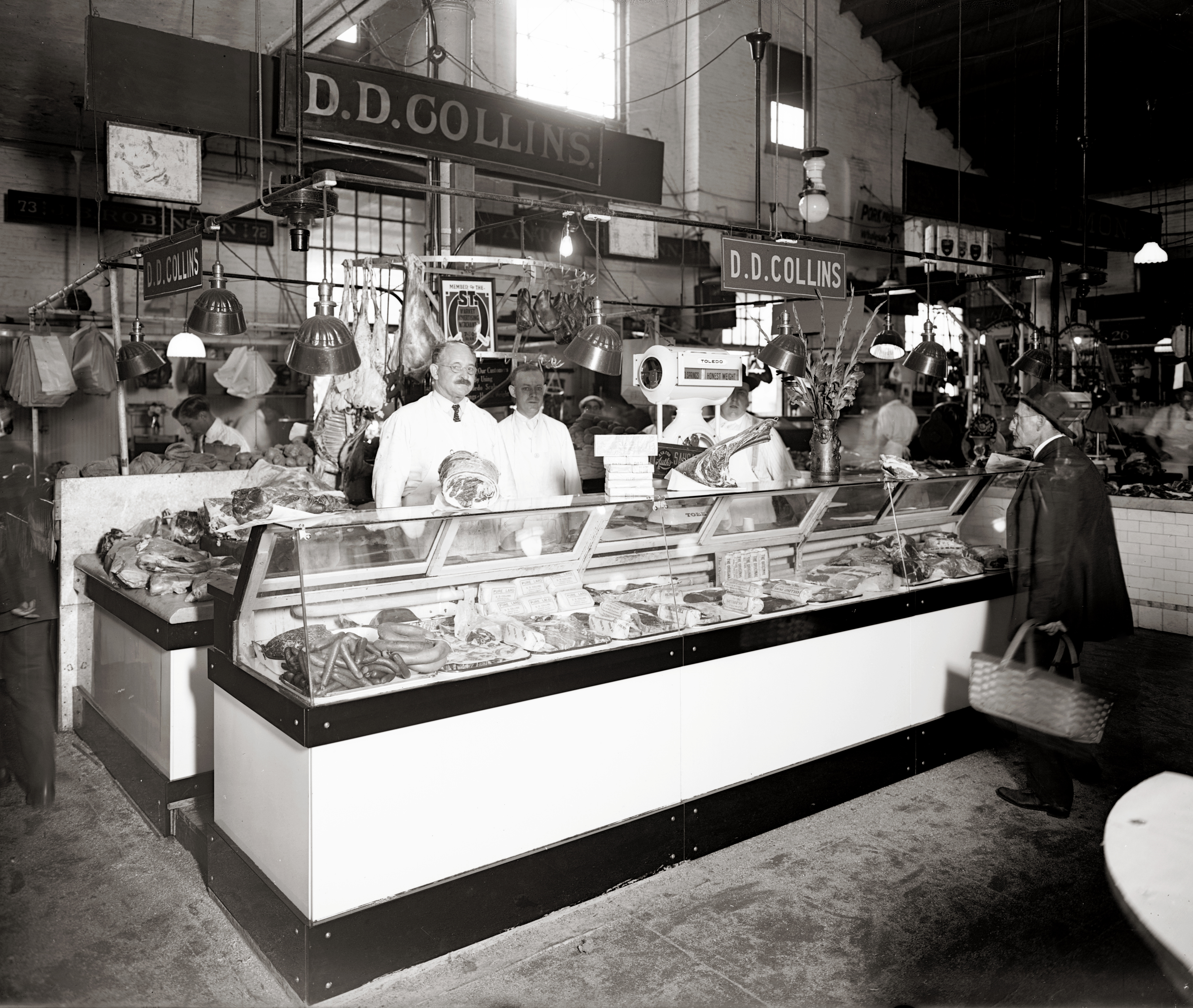
A meat stand in O Street Market, 1915

The area surrounding the O Street Market, known as Shaw, was demographically mixed. The white population included a large number of German immigrants, many of whom were vendors at the market. 7th Street NW was the heart of the city's Jewish community, and a significant number of African Americans lived in the neighborhood. The market continued to thrive even as the demographic and retail nature of the area neighborhood dramatically changed. By the 1920s, Shaw was overwhelmingly black, black vendors had supplanted the German American retailers at the market, and black-owned and operated businesses formed new retail corridors along 7th, 9th, and 14th Streets between P and U Streets. The market and Shaw neighborhood both deteriorated after World War II. By the 1960s, the market faced heavy competition from modern grocery stores and fell into disrepair. Local residents picketed the market, which led the city to enforce cleanliness regulations and building codes at the facility.

In 1966, the District of Columbia, the National Capital Planning Commission, and the Redevelopment Land Agency (RLA; a joint city-federal agency overseeing redevelopment in the city) announced the establishment of the Shaw Urban Renewal Area. The 1968 riots caused only minor damage to the building, but the market did not reopen afterward. The closure of the market and many other nearby businesses caused a widespread decline in the neighborhood, and left local residents without easy access to retail establishments. In 1972, the Council of the District of Columbia approved a $30.4 million ($252 million in 2025 dollars) plan which, in part, provided for the purchase the O Street Market and its demolition. A modern shopping mall was planned for the site. The RLA purchased the property from the NLMC. Although neighborhood residents wanted the market torn down, the RLA declined to order its destruction. In 1974, the RLA proposed renovating the O Street Market and making it the retail centerpiece of a revived Shaw neighborhood. The agency awarded a $338,974 ($2,212,938 in 2025 dollars) contract in June 1974 to the firm of James Cox & Sons to renovate the structure.

In 1977, local African American entrepreneur James C. Adkins purchased the market and the rest of Square 422 for $200,000 ($1,062,603 in 2025 dollars). Adkins began construction on a modern grocery store next to the O Street Market, (Note: Although Adkins owned the new building, the store itself was co-owned by the District of Columbia Development Corporation, Shaw Community Citizens Pact, and Giant Food. Giant Food agreed to operate the store for the three partners. Giant Food had considered buying the O Street Market in mid-1976, but for reasons which are unclear the company did not do so.) and won a $1.75 million ($93 million in 2025 dollars) loan from the federal Economic Development Administration to help renovate the 1881 market building. Adkins said he would add stalls inside and outside the market and lease them to food and other vendors. Renovation of the historic structure was more costly than anticipated, and Adkins was forced to seek an additional $300,000 ($1,330,812 in 2025 dollars) in 1979 to complete its rehabilitation. Adkins, who had also purchased Square 426, successfully petitioned the National Capital Planning Commission to close 8th Street between P and O Streets NW. Adkins planned to turn the street into a pedestrian mall, parking lot, and landscaped area. Giant Food opened on October 10, 1979, and the O Street Market reopened on February 23, 1980.

On March 31, 1994, during the two-decade crime wave of the 1980s and 1990s, the O Street Market was the site of a deadly shooting rampage. Seventeen-year-old Kevin Aaron McCrimmon paid five young men to kill 15-year-old Duwan A'Vant, who was known to frequent the market, because A'Vant had reportedly stolen a car from McCrimmon. At around 7 pm, the five men entered the market and fired more than 30 rounds, killing A'Vant and wounding eight others (including a toddler and two elderly women). Although there were 399 homicides in the city that year, the event shocked residents because it was such a brazen attack in a public place.

By the late 1990s, the O Street Market had once more become dilapidated. The structure fell into disrepair, trash collected around the building, many vendors were squatters without leases, and drug dealers and gang members loitered nearby, driving customers away. The building's owner fell behind on tax payments, and the city threatened to place a lien on the building and foreclose.

Because O Street Market is one of only three 19th-century public market buildings remaining in Washington, D.C., it was listed on the National Register of Historic Places on April 28, 1995. It was previously added to the District of Columbia Inventory of Historic Sites on July 24, 1968.

=== 21st century ===
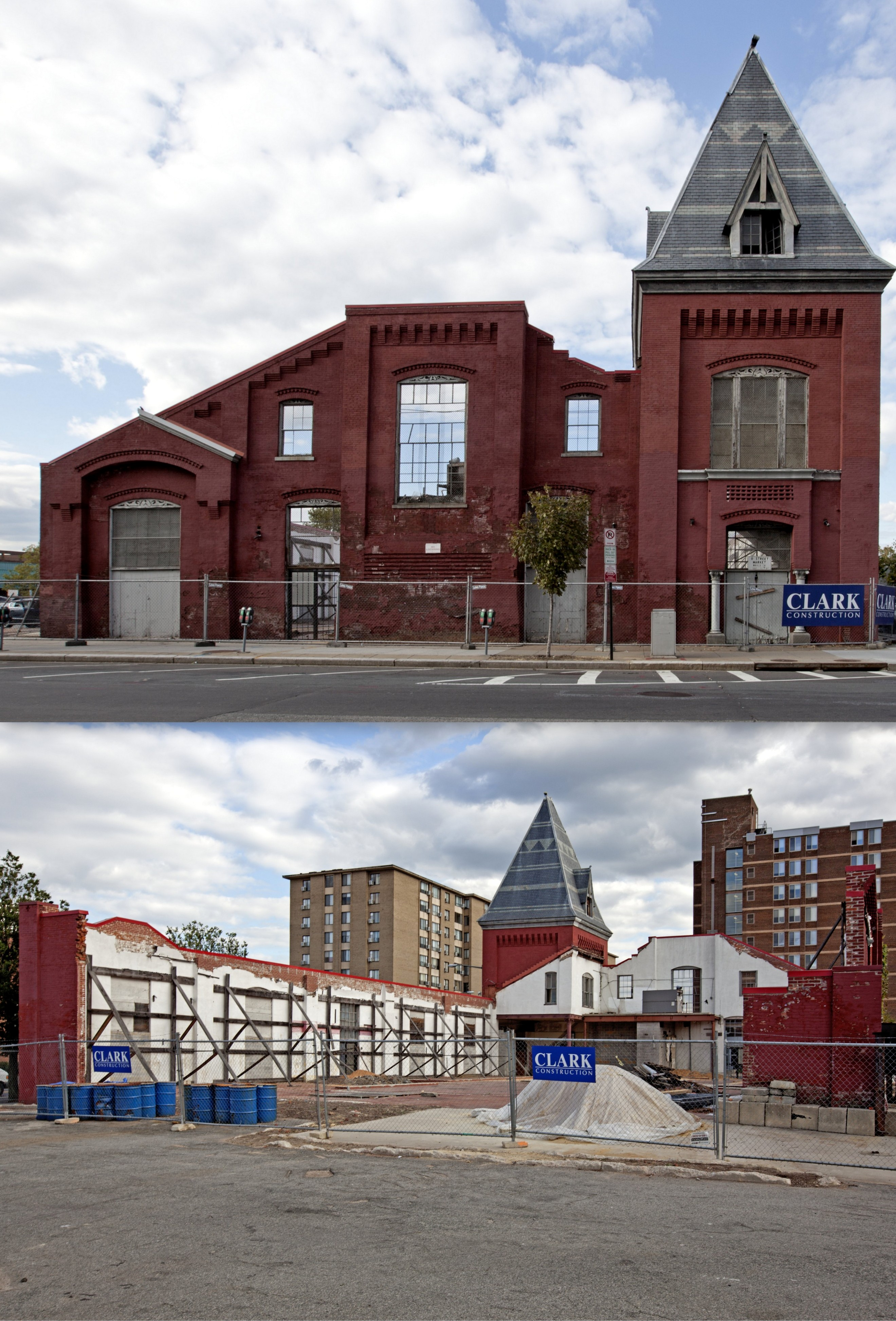
O Street Market in 2010, seven years after the roof collapsed

In 2001, local firm Roadside Development purchased the building with plans to rehabilitate the facility along with the Madison Retail Group. (Note: Roadside Development was owned by three partners: Armond Spikell, Todd Weiss, and Richard Lake. Lake's uncle had worked at O Street Market.) They proposed the partial closure of a 40-foot-wide (12 m) plaza on 8th Street to be replaced with a sidewalk, parking lot, and retail space, and for the addition of new windows in the walls. The D.C. Historic Preservation Review Board refused to authorize these changes, but the renovation of the interior was approved. The last tenants, consisting of small restaurants and shops, vacated the structure in late 2002 in preparation for remodeling set to begin in March or April 2003. On February 18, 2003, following a historic blizzard, the roof collapsed.

Redevelopment of the O Street Market was delayed for two years as the developers sought to meet the demands imposed by the Historic Preservation Review Board. Community leaders and neighborhood residents regularly called for the project to resume in hopes that it would spur other development and decrease gang activity in the area.

Roadside Development proposed a significantly expanded redevelopment in June 2004 that included most of Square 422. The company determined that the only way to make the O Street Market viable was to greatly enhance parking at the site. It could not do so without building extensive underground parking, and to build the parking garage would require construction of new buildings adjacent to the O Street Market and the Giant Food grocery store. The company initially proposed a $100 million project consisting of new construction and renovations which would add condominiums, apartments, a two-story underground parking garage, and either a new or renovated grocery store. By March 2005, when Roadside Development won its first design and zoning approval reviews, the plan had expanded into a $260 million project which included a 180-room hotel, 300 condominiums, 300 apartments, 700 underground parking spaces, and 7,500 square feet (700 m^{2}) of new retail space. The O Street Market would be restored, renovated and incorporated into a new 65,000 sq ft (6,000 m^{2}) Giant Food store. The proposal also called for the city to reopen 8th Street NW.

The O Street Market redevelopment received a setback in November 2007 when the District of Columbia Zoning Commission demanded that the development reduce the height of the new buildings to 90 feet (27 m) from 110 feet (34 m) and refused to reconsider its decision. Local residents denounced the zoning board's actions, which they perceived as imperiling redevelopment of their poverty-stricken neighborhood. After Roadside met the height requirements by removing penthouse apartments, the zoning commission approved the project in late March 2008. The project received its final approvals from the Historic Preservation Review Board and the D.C. Office of Planning in April and May 2008.

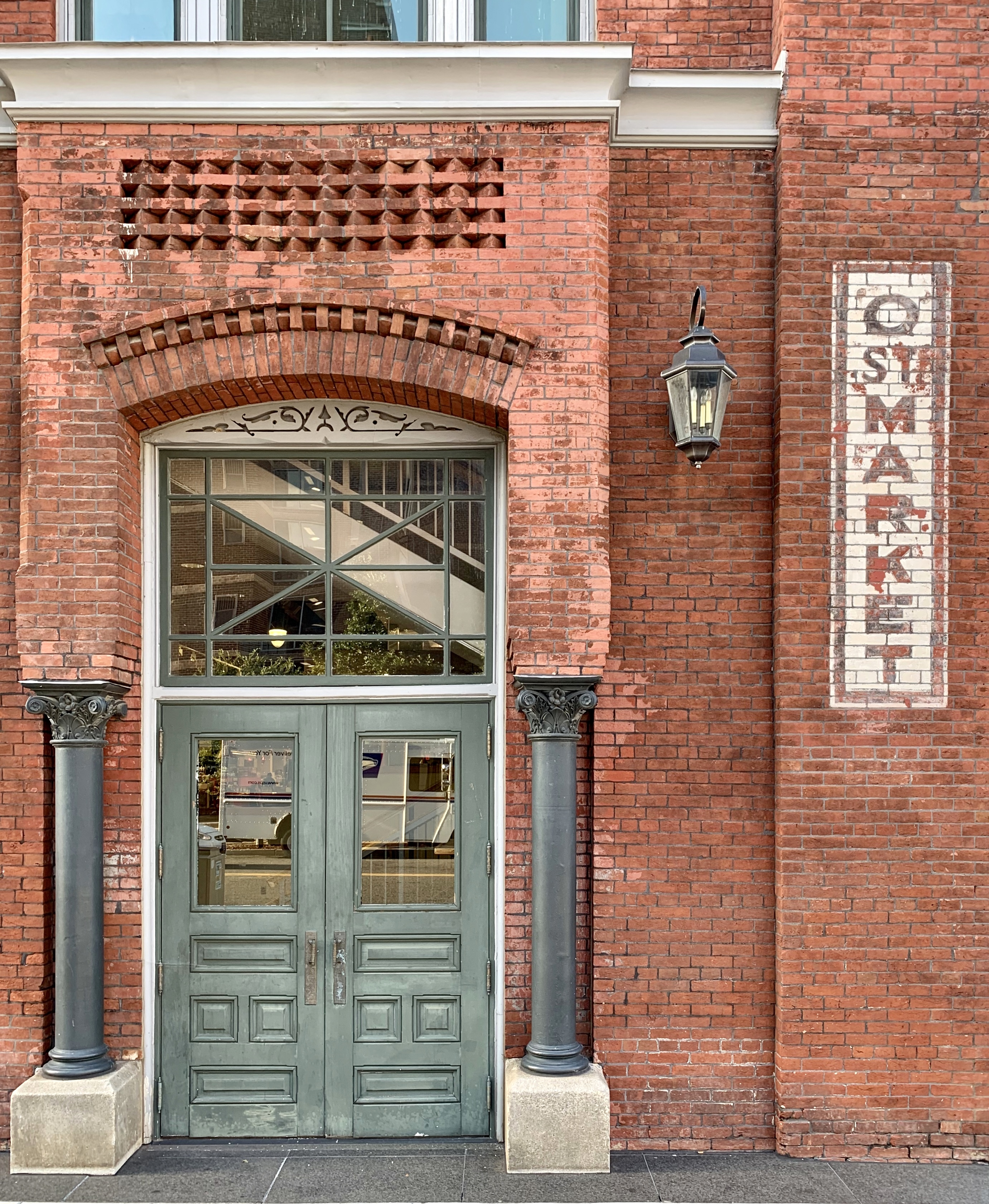
Door on the original portion of the market building after restoration.

By mid-summer 2008, the cost of the project had grown to $325 million. Now named "City Market at O", the nine-story development included over 600 units of housing, a 200-room hotel, retail space, and a new Giant supermarket almost doubling the size of the existing store. Mayor Adrian Fenty announced the city government would provide $35 million in tax increment financing (TIF) and plans were made to break ground in late 2009. The city also contributed $1 million toward the construction of the rent-controlled apartments for low-income residents, and $1.5 million in pre-development grants. Rising costs and delays pushed the project's cost higher, and by the time the city council acted, the city's TIF commitment had risen to $46.5 million.

The official City Market groundbreaking ceremony was held September 1, 2010. The Department of Housing and Urban Development (HUD) provided a $117 million loan for the development and the Obama administration chose City Market at O as one of 14 nationwide projects to receive expedited permitting and environmental reviews in order to provide hundreds of infrastructure jobs. The Giant Food store closed and was razed in mid-2011, and Cambria Suites agreed to operate the hotel in October. The project was designed by Shalom Baranes Associates and built by Clark Construction.

The new development opened in stages beginning in 2013. The 90-unit low-income senior housing apartment complex opened on August 21, 2013, and the 555-unit luxury apartment building was occupied on November 4. The apartment buildings offered a combined 86,000 sq ft (8,000 m^{2}) of retail space. The new Giant opened on November 21, 2013. The 72,000 sq ft (6,700 m^{2}) grocery store includes a cafe and bar built into the O Street Market's historic tower. In the middle of the store, arches utilizing some of the original brickwork designate the former location of the market's exterior wall. Progressive Grocer, an industry trade journal, gave an award for best overall design to the new Giant Food store in 2014. In 2015, City Market at O was a winner of the Urban Land Institute's Global Awards for Excellence competition. The 182-room Cambria Suites hotel opened in May 2014. The final phase of the development, 880 P, is a 142-unit apartment building which was completed in 2017.

== Original design ==
O Street Market previously consisted of between 12,000 sq ft (1,100 m^{2}) and 12,500 sq ft (1,160 m^{2}) (Note: Sources differ on the square footage.) on the main level and a 4,500 sq ft (420 m^{2}) basement. The facade of the original one-story, rectangular brick building is 95 ft (29 m) wide and 150 ft (46 m) long. The most distinctive feature of this Gothic Revival section is the square tower on the northwest corner of 7th and O Streets NW. A gable roof and a monitor run the length of the remaining portion of the original facade. Including the tower, there are six bays on the 7th Street facade and five on the O Street facade. On the 7th Street facade, each bay features a pair of doors and transom windows. The bays on the O Street facade also have double doors and transom windows, except for the central bay, which projects and features a large window. The second and fourth bay transom windows on the O Street facade are surmounted by double-hung windows.

The tower is crowned with a large pyramidal roof and dormers. On each street-facing facade of the tower there are two sets of doors with large transom windows. Each set of doors is framed by columns topped with cast iron foliate capitals. The columns support a projection that features decorative brickwork and a segmental arch. The windows on the second level of the tower are surmounted by a decorative wood panel and corbelled cornice.

== See also ==
- National Register of Historic Places listings in Washington, D.C.
