= Immaculate Conception Church (Washington, D.C.) =

Historic church in Washington, D.C., United States

- U.S. National Register of Historic Places
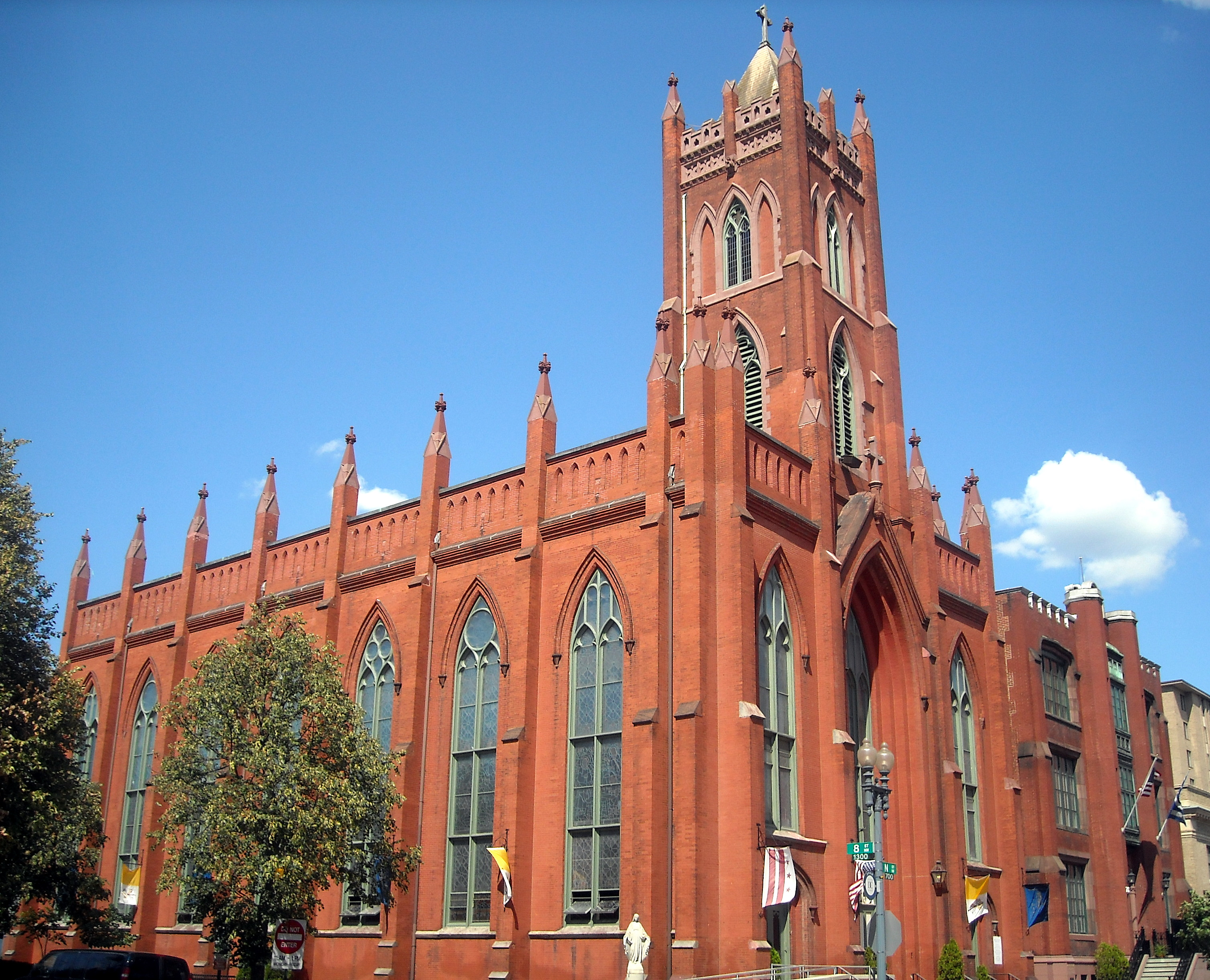
- View from southwest in 2008

- Location within Washington, D.C.
- Location: 1315 8th St. NW; Washington, D.C., U.S.
- Coordinates: 38°54′26″N 77°1′22″W
- Area: less than one acre
- Built: 1870; 156 years ago
- Architect: Clements, Edward
- Architectural style: Gothic Revival, Italianate
- NRHP reference No.: 03000946
- Added to NRHP: September 17, 2003

Immaculate Conception Catholic Church is a historic Catholic parish in the United States in Washington, D.C. Located at 1315 8th Street Northwest, the church, school, rectory, and convent were placed on the National Register of Historic Places in 2003.

The cornerstone of the original church, located on a lot near the corner of 8th and N Streets took place on October 30, 1864. Martin John Spalding, Archbishop of Baltimore, dedicated the new church on July 2, 1865, the Feast of the Visitation. The parish rapidly outgrew this structure, however, and on November 13, 1870, the cornerstone for the present Gothic Revival church was laid, with construction commencing the following year. Dedicated in 1874, at which time the old structure became the parish and school hall, the church was refurbished in 1939 and 1962–63.

== History ==
The construction of the church was finished on October 30, 1864. Father Reverend Patrick F. McCarthy was the first Pastor of the church. Before Immaculate Conception Church was established, St. Patrick's Church built in 1794, was the first parish in the city. Despite the addition of St Peter's (Capitol Hill 1820), St Matthew the Apostle (1840, and later upgraded to the Cathedral), St Mary's, Mother of God (1846) and St Aloysius (1859), St. Patrick's was becoming overcrowded and to better suit its members, Immaculate Conception Church was founded in the Shaw neighborhood. Back to the beginning of the eighteenth century, most parishioners of the church were either Catholics who were original residents in this area or other immigrating Irish, and worshiping weekly was a part of their tradition.

The land of Immaculate Conception Church originally belonged to William Jones, and it was deeded by him on October 6, 1864 for $16,000, with $8,000 paid up front. It can be seen that the church was under the construction even before the land was deeded. Father J. Walter began the project during the summer of 1864. The cornerstone was laid on Sunday, October 30, 1864. Construction was completed the following summer of 1865. On July 2, the feast of the Visitation of the Blessed Virgin, the Most Reverend Martin J. Spalding, Archbishop of Baltimore, dedicated the new church assisted by Father Walter and Rev P. F. McCarthy of St. Patrick's.

The landowner's desire was to make this land a place for church and school. At the meantime, a school was also built associated with the church and it was named as Immaculate Conception Catholic School. The building was finished construction in 1908. Due to the creation and establishment of a school, the number of parishioners grew by over 2,000. As a result, the Immaculate Conception Church and School could not hold its growing population.

The developments of the area in the two periods (1800–1850 and 1850–1880) are strongly related. Before 1850, when St. Patrick's Church was still the only Catholic parish in the city, it benefited the neighborhoods including Shaw. However, parishioners in Shaw had to walk to St. Patrick's at 10th and G Streets Northwest. Since there was no Catholic Church in Shaw neighborhood prior to 1850, parishioners in Shaw wished to have their own church as well as a school. The lack of a local Catholic church in Shaw before 1850 really encouraged the establishment of the Immaculate Conception Church in 1860s. “It was located on N Street next to a vacant corner lot 8th and N Streets and was the first structure to be built in the area.” Therefore, it is a very significant landmark in Shaw neighborhood, and it helped the neighborhood build up a reputation.
