= Judge Shaw =

Judge Shaw may refer to:

- Charles Alexander Shaw (1944–2020), judge of the United States District Court for the Eastern District of Missouri
- Elwyn R. Shaw (1888–1950), judge of the United States District Court for the Northern District of Illinois
- John Malach Shaw (1931–1999), judge of the United States District Court for the Western District of Louisiana
- Robert Shaw (judge) (1907–1972), judge of the United States District Court for the District of New Jersey

== See also ==
- Justice Shaw (disambiguation)
