= Weddington, Warwickshire =

Village in Warwickshire, England

Coordinates: 52.536°N 1.465°W

Weddington
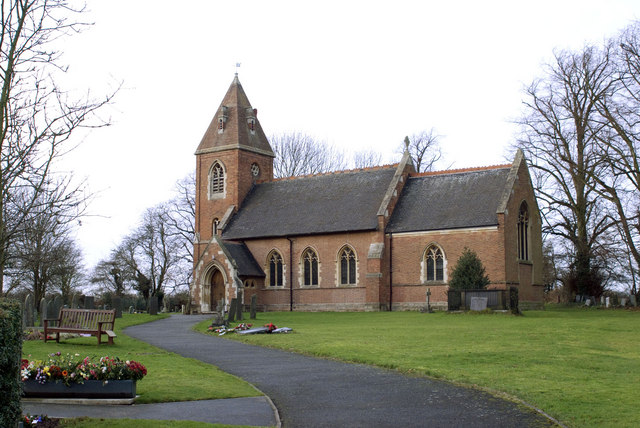
- St. James Church

- Location within Warwickshire
- District: Nuneaton and Bedworth
- Shire county: Warwickshire
- Region: West Midlands
- Country: England
- Sovereign state: United Kingdom
- Police: Warwickshire
- Fire: Warwickshire
- Ambulance: West Midlands

Weddington is an area of Nuneaton in the Nuneaton and Bedworth district, in the county of Warwickshire, England. It bounded on the northeast by Watling Street, and on the west by the River Anker. The Ward population taken at the 2011 census was 7,256.

It is surrounded on the west and south by the Anker, and comprises the church, Rectory, Church Farm, the Grove, and the grounds of the former Weddington Castle. A branch road leading south from Watling Street passes through the village.

== History ==
Weddington Castle was probably built on the site of the capital mansion-house mentioned in a suit of 1566. It may have been built by Thomas, Marquess of Dorset, who enclosed the whole manor of Weddington in 1491, converting all the land to pasture, whereby 300 acres (1.2 km^{2}) went out of cultivation, 10 houses were allowed to go to ruin, and 60 people were driven from their homes, losing their occupation.

After the forfeiture of Thomas's son, the Duke of Suffolk, the manor was leased by the Crown until 1561 and one of the lessees, Mr. Trye, rebuilt the village and 'made habitations mete for husbandry'. In 1730 Thomas notes that there were four farmhouses and the Manor House in the parish, and even in 1901 the population was only just over 100. Since that time, with the development of Nuneaton, many small houses have been built.

In 1921 the civil parish had a population of 87. Weddington became part of the parish and borough of Nuneaton under the Borough of Nuneaton (Extension) Order 1931, which came into operation on 1 April 1931.

The woodland in Weddington was 2 furlongs in length and 1 furlong broad in 1086, and in 1849 there were 90 acres (360,000 m^{2}) of woodland, but by 1886 there was none outside the grounds of the Castle.

Richard Vines, a Puritan Divine and Ancient Greek scholar, was presented to the living of Weddington in 1627 and to Caldecote in 1630, holding both for a time. He was one of the orthodox divines presented for Warwickshire to be consulted about the reformed liturgy. He had gifts as a preacher, and a sermon preached before the House of Commons in 1642 made a great impression. With other Puritans he took refuge at Coventry in 1643. In the following year he was made Master of Pembroke Hall, Cambridge, where he did good work, showing himself a good administrator and promoter of learning. He married Katherine, daughter of Humphrey Adderley of Weddington.

== Transport and facilities ==
Weddington is now a suburb of Nuneaton with two local primary schools, Weddington Primary School and the new Lower Farm Academy on the newly built estate and secondary school, Higham Lane School. The A444 runs through the parish where it is called Weddington Road; further out of Nuneaton, it is Weddington Lane.

There is a stretch of greenbelt bordering Weddington which is called Sandon Fields, known locally as Weddington or Weddy Meadows. The field has a sports pavilion, football pitches and the Cleaver Gardens flats. There is a second field, which is a narrow strip with a children's park, running south of Weddington to St. Nicolas Park; this is called Coronation Walk and known locally as Brookie Fields.

== Notable people ==
- Charles Shawe (1878–1951), cricketer
