= Charles Shawe =

English cricketer

Personal information
- Full name: Charles Shawe
- Born: 15 November 1878; Nuneaton, Warwickshire, England
- Died: 9 February 1951 (aged 72); Witham Friary, Somerset, England
- Batting: Unknown
- Bowling: Unknown

Career statistics
Competition	First-class
Matches	1
Runs scored	0
Batting average	0.00
100s/50s	–/–
Top score	0
Balls bowled	12
Wickets	0
Bowling average	–
5 wickets in innings	–
10 wickets in match	–
Best bowling	–
Catches/stumpings	–/–
- Source: Cricinfo, 26 July 2019

Charles Shawe (15 November 1878 – 9 February 1951) was an English first-class cricketer.

The son of Henry Cunliffe Shawe and his wife, Georgina Wilmot Gresley, he was born at Weddington Hall in Warwickshire. Shawe attended the Royal Military College, Sandhurst, graduating into the Rifle Brigade as a second lieutenant in 1898. He was promoted to the rank of lieutenant in April 1900, with promotion to the rank of captain coming in April 1904. He was seconded for service as aide-de-camp to General Lyttelton in May 1908. He later served as the aide-de-camp to Arthur Foljambe, 2nd Earl of Liverpool in November 1912. He retired from active service in November 1913, at which point he was transferred to the Reserve of Officers. Shawe returned to active service during the First World War, serving on the general staff.

Shawe later made a single appearance in first-class cricket for H. D. G. Leveson Gower's XI against Oxford University at Eastbourne in 1919. Batting once in the match, Shawe was dismissed without scoring in the H. D. G. Leveson Gower's XI first-innings by Frederic Waldock, while in the Oxford second-innings he bowled two overs, which conceded 32 runs. He died in February 1951 at Witham Friary, Somerset.
