= Justice Shaw =

Justice Shaw may refer to:

- Duncan Shaw (judge) (fl. 1950s–2000s), justice of the British Columbia Supreme Court
- Elwyn R. Shaw (1888–1950), justice of the Supreme Court of Illinois
- Greg Shaw (judge) (born 1957), justice of the Alabama Supreme Court
- Leander J. Shaw Jr. (1930–2015), chief justice of the Florida Supreme Court
- Lemuel Shaw (1781–1861), justice of the Massachusetts Supreme Judicial Court
- Lucien Shaw (1845–1933), chief justice of the Supreme Court of California

== See also ==
- Judge Shaw (disambiguation)
