= Miles Howell =

English cricketer

Miles_Howell

Miles Howell (9 September 1893 – 23 February 1976) was an English first-class cricketer active 1913–39 who played for Surrey (awarded county cap 1920) and Oxford University playing in the Varsity matches in 1914 and 1919. In the latter he scored a career best 170 as he skippered his side to a 45 run win.

Pamela Hume and Miles Howell at their wedding, 1926.

Howell was born in Thames Ditton to Reginald Howell (1856-1912), the managing director of Stevenson & Howell, manufacturing chemists, and Mary, the second daughter of Sir George Nares, who had married in 1882. He attended Repton School from 1907-1913 and Oriel College, Oxford University, where he captained the Oxford University A.F.C. as well as the Cricket team. On the 2nd of December 1926, at Holy Trinity Church, Sloane Square, he married Pamela Winifred Humm (1903-1992), the sister of actress Benita Hume. They had a son, John, named after Howells brother, who had fallen in France in 1915, and divorced in 1940. In September 1945, he married Evelyn Cecilia Force, née Matthews. He died in Lychwood, Worplesdon Hill, Surrey.
