= Shaw (Washington, D.C.) =

Neighborhood of Washington, D.C.

Coordinates: 38°54′40.1″N 77°1′18.9″W

- Neighborhood of Washington, D.C.
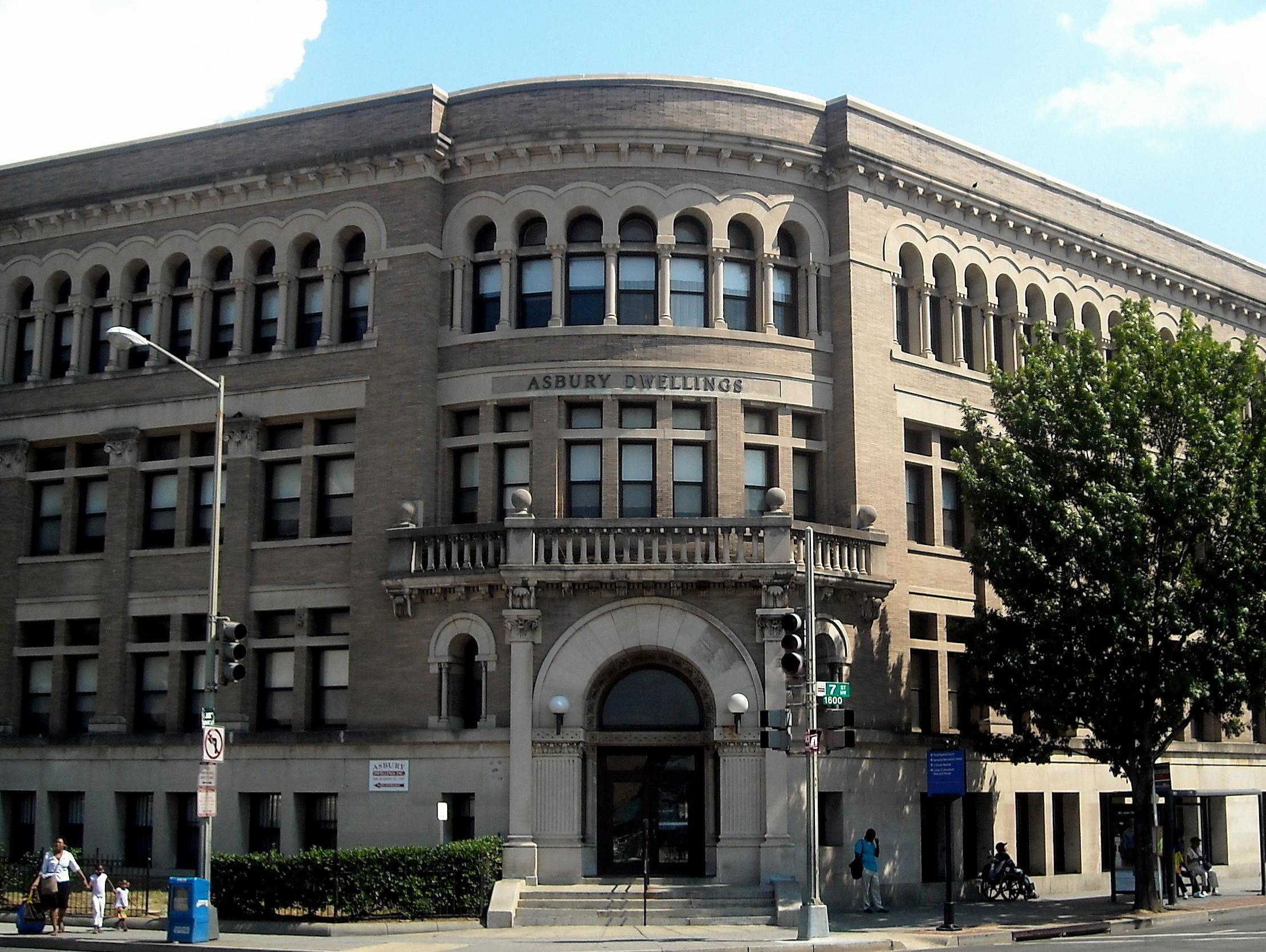
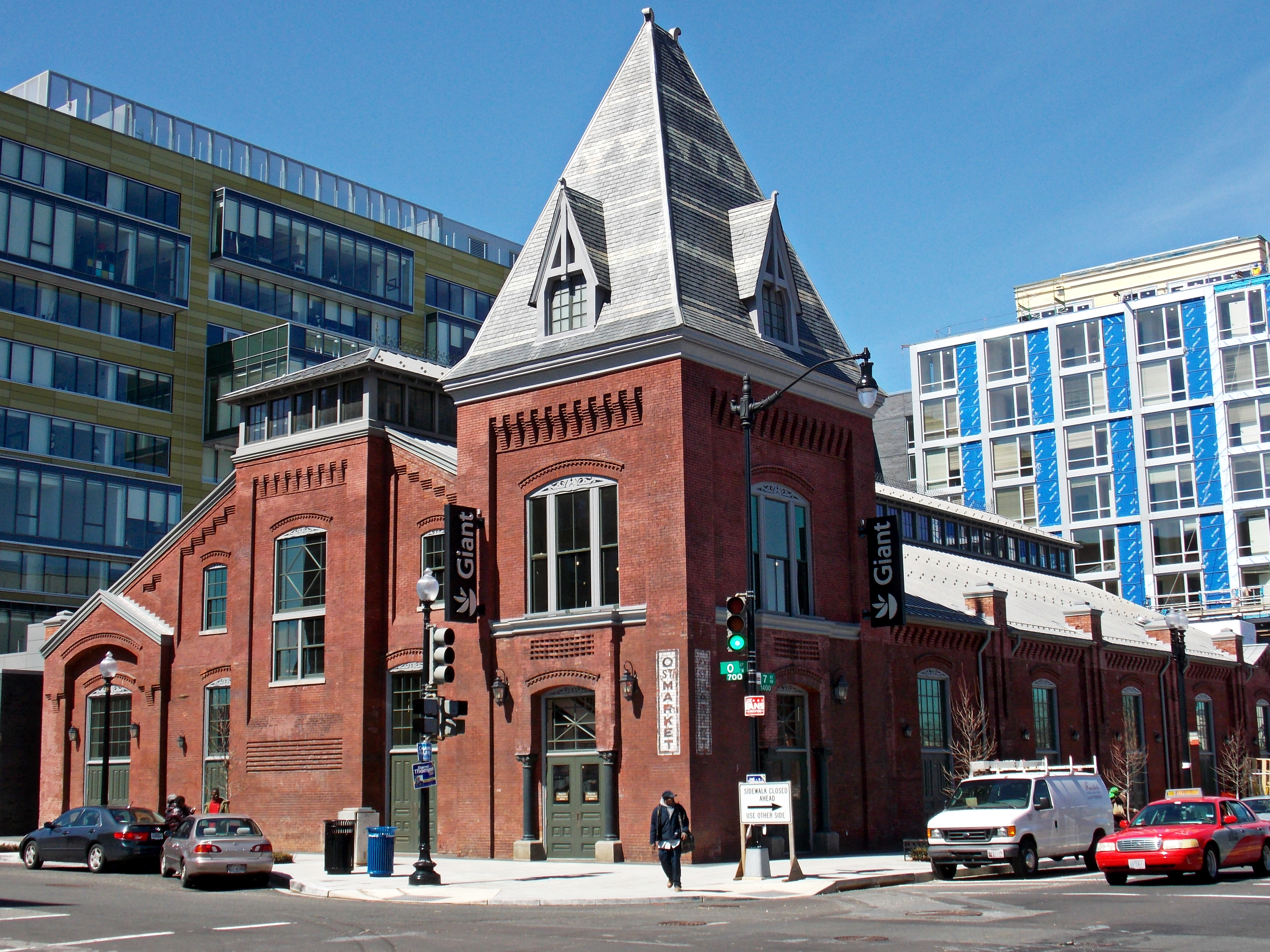
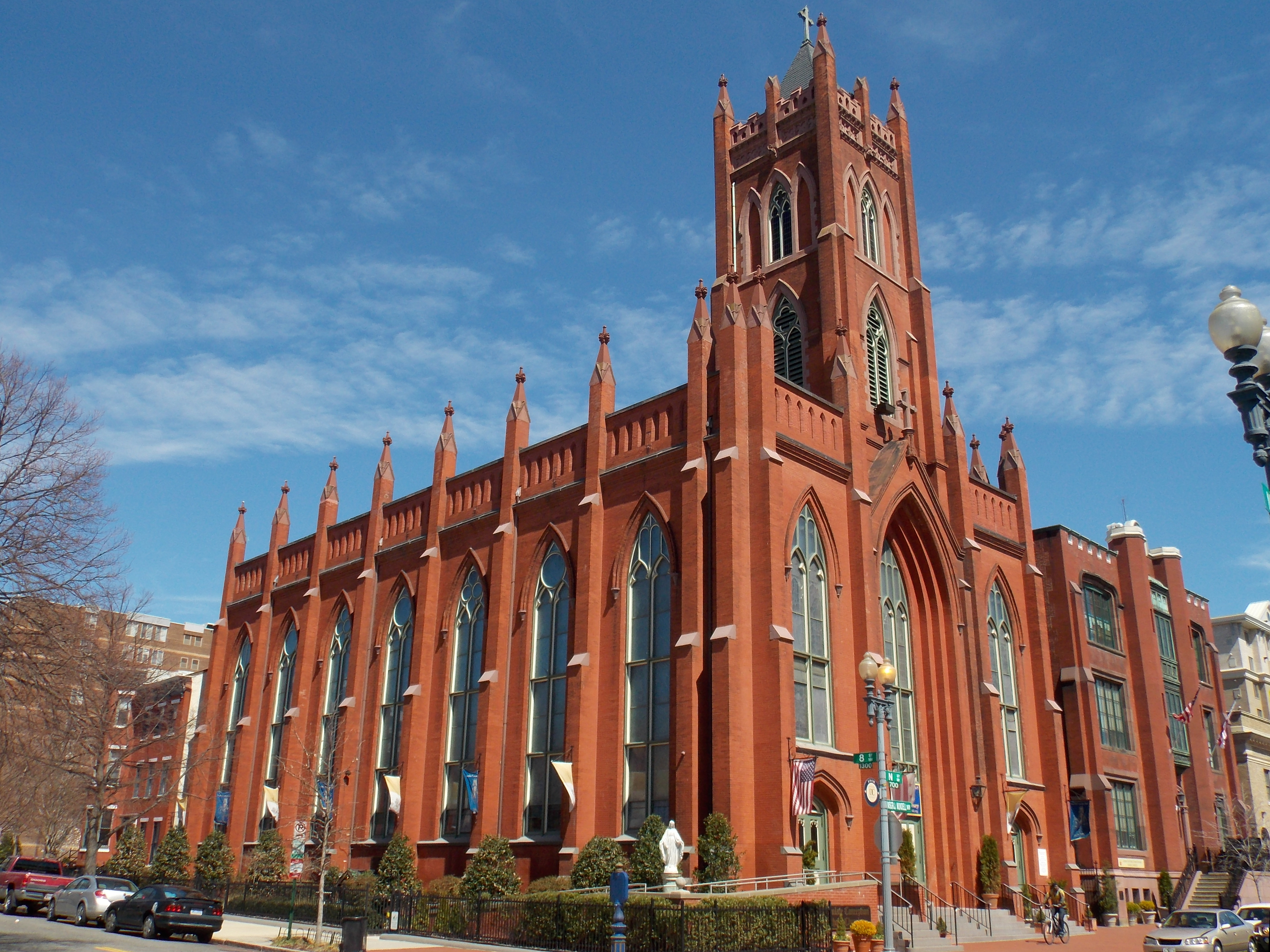
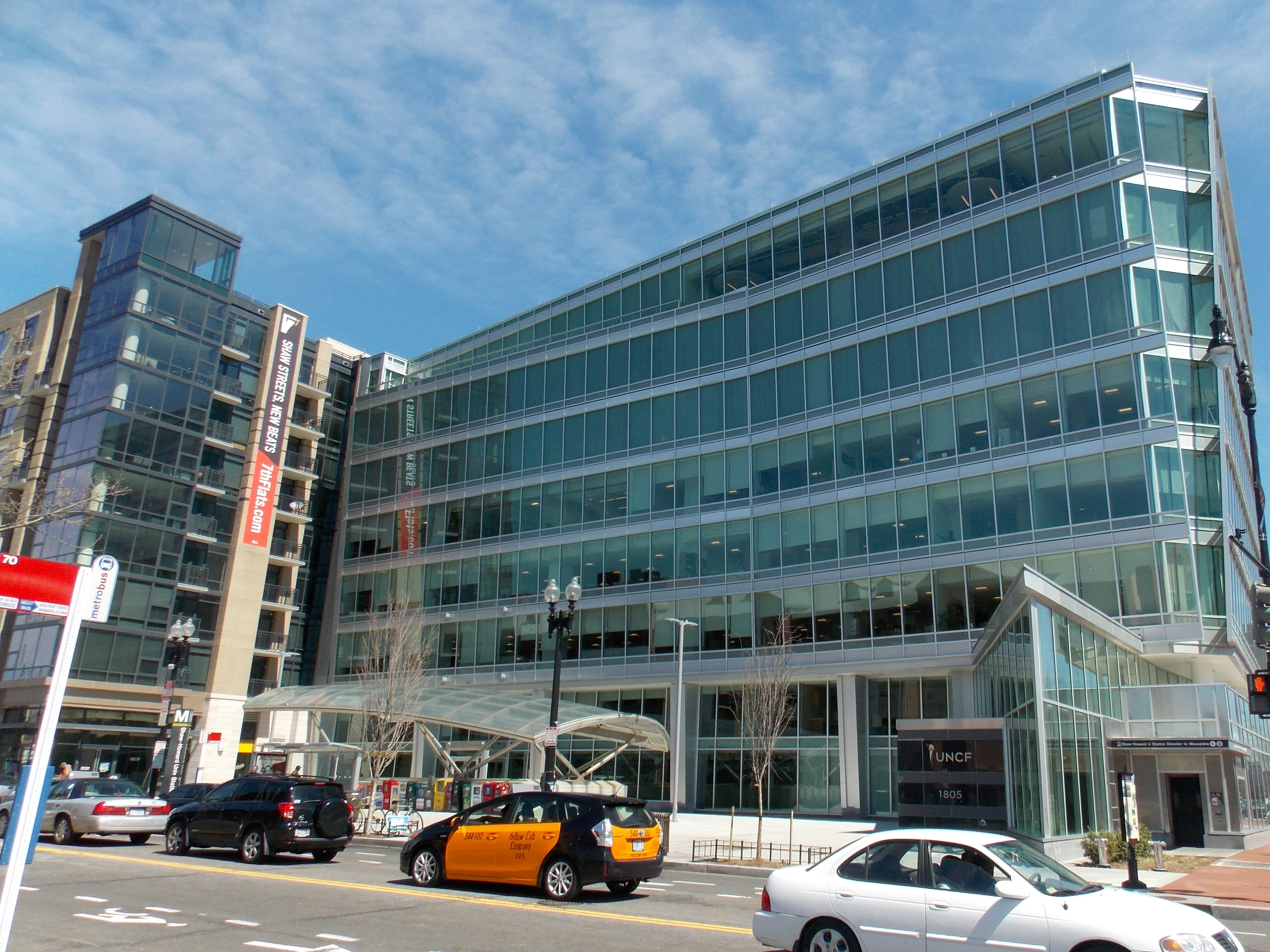
- Clockwise from top left: Asbury Dwellings; O Street Market; UNCF; Immaculate Conception Church.

- Shaw within the District of Columbia
- Country: United States
- District: Washington, D.C.
- Ward: Wards 1 and 2
- Named for: Shaw School, named for Robert Gould Shaw

Government
  - Councilmember: Brianne Nadeau (Ward 1); Brooke Pinto (Ward 2)

Area
  - Total: .73 sq mi (1.9 km^{2})

Population (2010)
  - Total: 17,639
  - Density: 24,163/sq mi (9,329/km^{2})
- Postal code: ZIP code

Shaw is a neighborhood of Washington, D.C., located in the Northwest quadrant. Shaw is a major entertainment and retail hub, and much of the neighborhood is designated as a historic district, including the smaller Blagden Alley-Naylor Court Historic District. Shaw and the U Street Corridor have historically been the city's hub for African-American social, cultural, and economic life.

== History ==
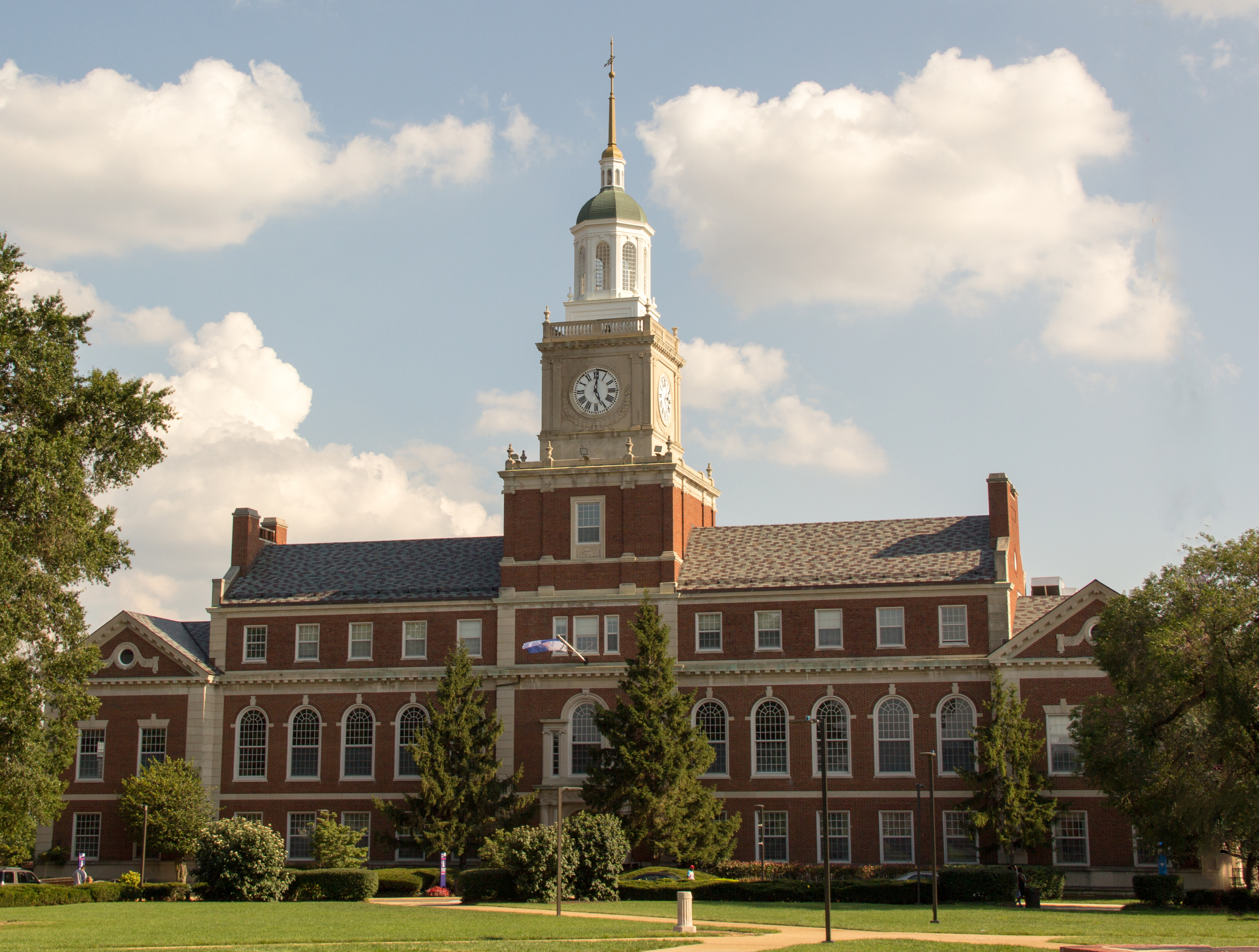
Howard University, founded in 1867

Shaw emerged from freed slave encampments in the rural outskirts of Washington, D.C. It was originally called "Uptown", in an era when the city's boundary ended at "Boundary Street" (now Florida Avenue).

The neighborhood thrived in the late 19th and early 20th centuries as the pre-Harlem, national center of U.S. black intellectual and cultural life. During this time, President Andrew Johnson signed Howard University's founding charter. Furthermore, in 1925, Professor Alain LeRoy Locke advanced the idea of "The New Negro" while Langston Hughes descended from LeDroit Park to hear the "sad songs" of 7th Street. Another famous Shaw native to emerge from this period—sometimes called the Harlem Renaissance—was Duke Ellington. Carter G. Woodson, an important historian of African American culture and society, lived in the neighborhood during the prime of his career and life in early- to mid-1900s.

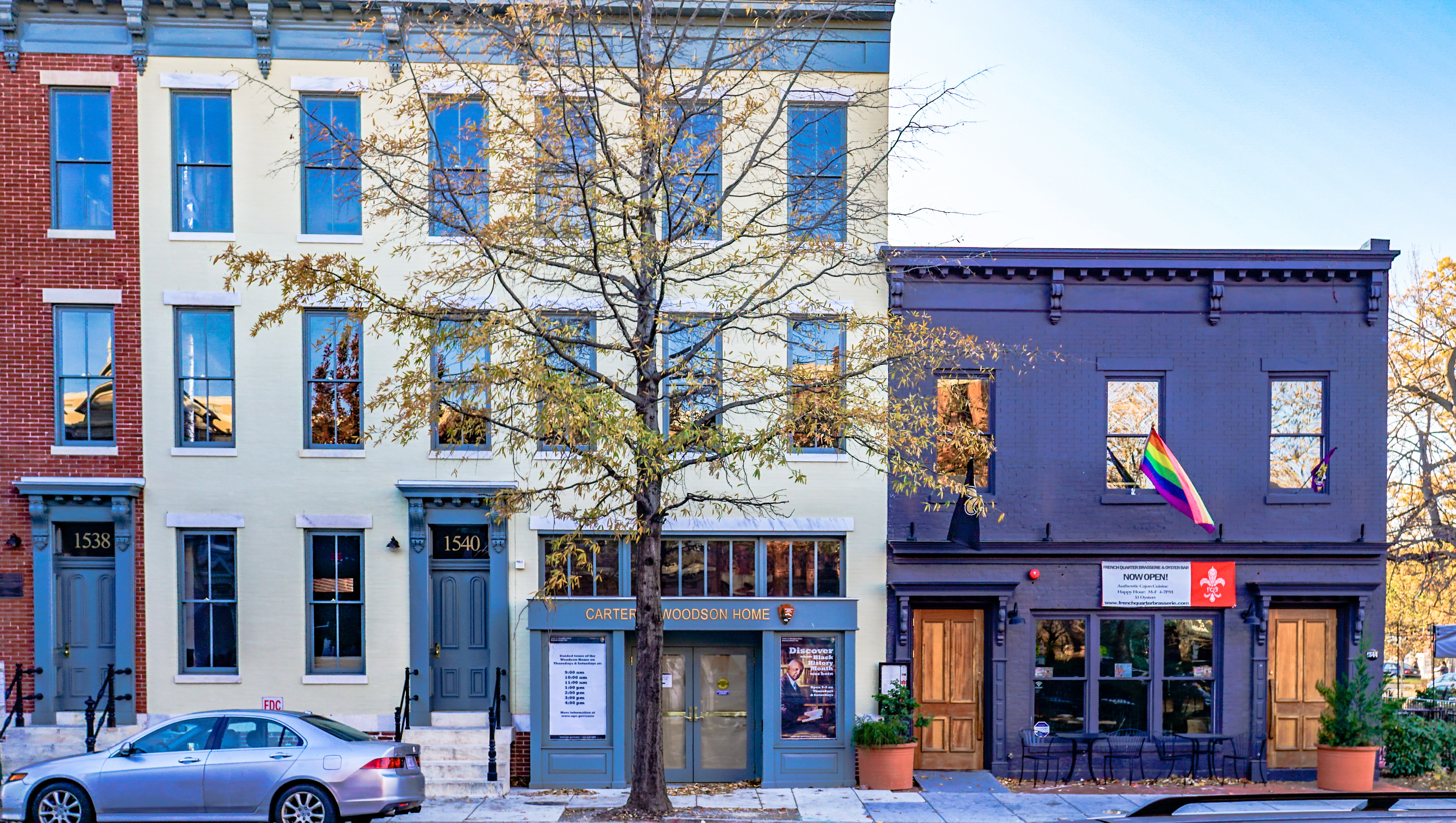
Carter G. Woodson Home National Historic Site

Following the assassination of Martin Luther King Jr. on April 4, 1968, riots erupted in many D.C. neighborhoods, including Shaw, Columbia Heights, and the H Street, NE corridor. The 1968 Washington, D.C., riots marked the beginning of a decline in population and development that condemned much of the inner city to a generation of economic decay. After the riots, Shaw was left without electricity and with burnt down buildings. Crime and fear increased. Succeeding the riots, Shaw civic leaders Walter Fauntroy and Watha T. Daniel led grassroots community renewal projects with the Model Inner City Community Organization (MICCO). MICCO used federal grant money to employ African American architects, engineers, and urban planners in inner-city Washington, D.C.

Bryant St. Pump Station, built 1905

Shaw is a residential neighborhood dominated by 19th-century Victorian row houses. The architecture of these houses, Shaw's central location, and the stability of D.C.'s housing market have transformed the neighborhood through gentrification. Gentrification beginning in the late 1970s and early 1980s generated new discussions between the inhabitants of the Shaw neighborhood and the Dupont Circle Conservancy organization. Preservation advocates in the Dupont Circle neighborhood began to propose the expansion of the neighborhood. The advocates were members of the Dupont Circle Conservancy, an organization predominantly led by European-American people. As a response to this proposal, the 14th and U Street Coalition, which called itself the representative of black interests and historical identity in neighboring Shaw, began protesting that the Dupont Circle preservationists were trying to occupy their neighborhood and its history.

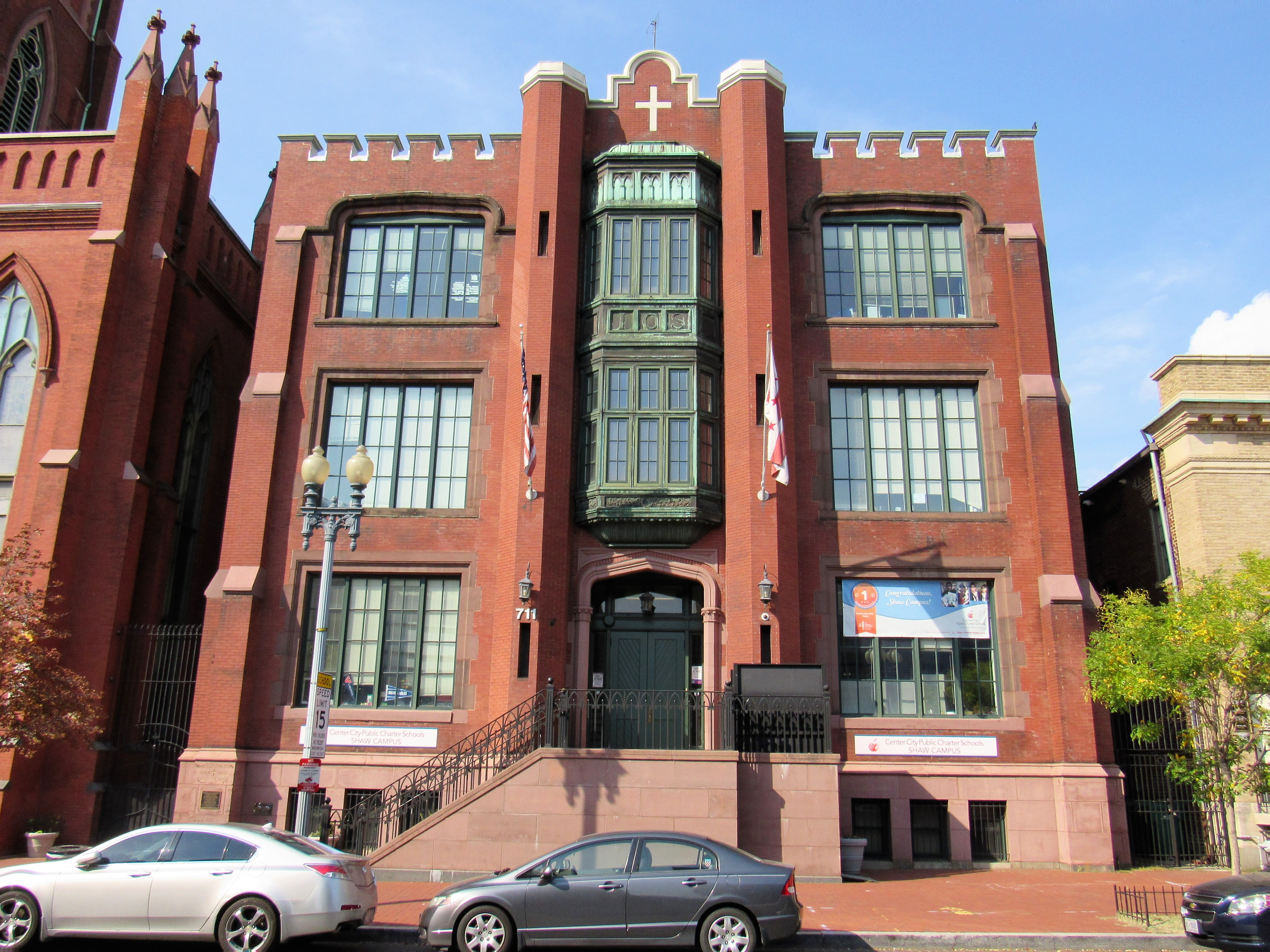
Immaculate Conception School

Until the 1960s, what is now Shaw was called Midcity. In 1966, planners used the enrollment boundary of Shaw Junior High School to define the Shaw School Urban Renewal Area covering what are now the Shaw, U Street Corridor and Logan Circle neighborhoods. The school had been named after Robert Gould Shaw, who led the 54th Massachusetts Infantry Regiment, one of the first official African American units during the American Civil War.

As the area diversified starting in the 1990s, neighborhoods in the north, west and east of what was considered Shaw during the urban renewal era became more frequently referred to by specific names and were no longer referred to as part of Shaw, such as the U Street Corridor (a.k.a. Cardozo/Shaw), Logan Circle, Truxton Circle, and Randolph Square; for the remaining area (7th/9th street corridor north from Convention Center to U Street), "Shaw" remains the unique, unequivocal name.

Gentrification in the 2010s transformed the neighborhood into an upscale retail hub. Gentrification has broadened the spectrum of political views in Shaw. Because the population has become more diversified, an influx of differing views, ideas, and outlooks has become more prominent.

== Geography ==
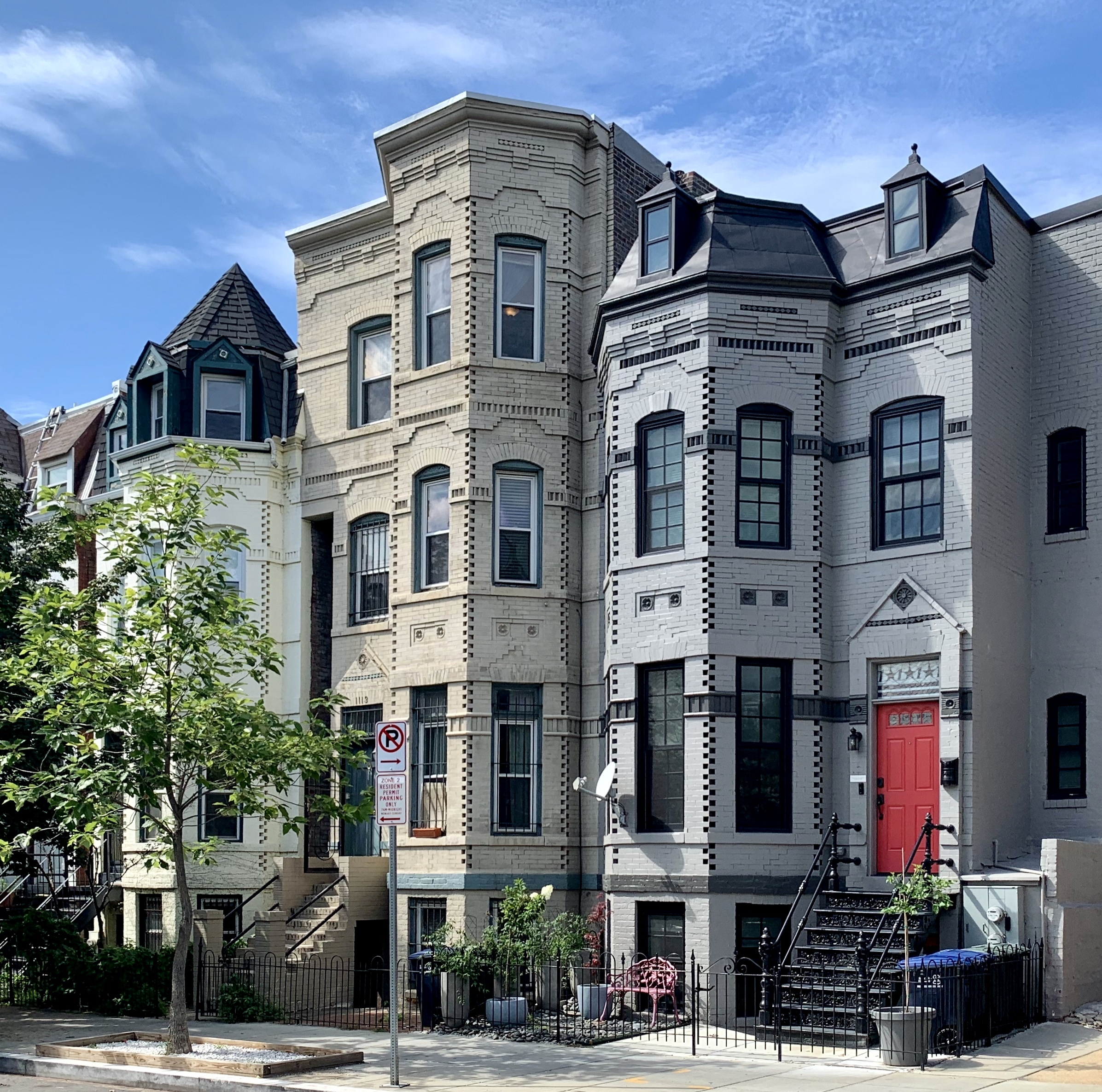
Historic rowhouses in Shaw

The most generally used definition of Shaw, without Logan Circle and the U Street Corridor, is bounded by:

- Florida Avenue NW and the U Street Corridor, Ledroit Park and Howard University on the north,
- M Street NW and Massachusetts Avenue NW, and Mount Vernon Square and Downtown Washington, D.C., on the south,
- First St. NW and Truxton Circle on the east, and
- 12th Street NW and the U Street and Logan Circle neighborhoods to the west.

Shaw consists of gridded streets lined mainly with small Victorian row houses, but also north of the convention center by urban-renewal-era low-rise apartment complexes and the late 2010s mixed-use development City Market at O. The original commercial hub of the area prior to the redevelopment in the wake of the 1968 riots and Green Line Metrorail construction was along 7th and 9th streets NW, and especially 7th street is still lined by small businesses housed in rowhouse-sized buildings. Tucked away into the alleys here are former light industrial buildings that now constitute the Blagden Alley-Naylor Court Historic District, home to restaurants, cafés and other small businesses. The Shaw Main Streets association is centered along 7th and 9th Streets between K and W streets.

== Culture ==
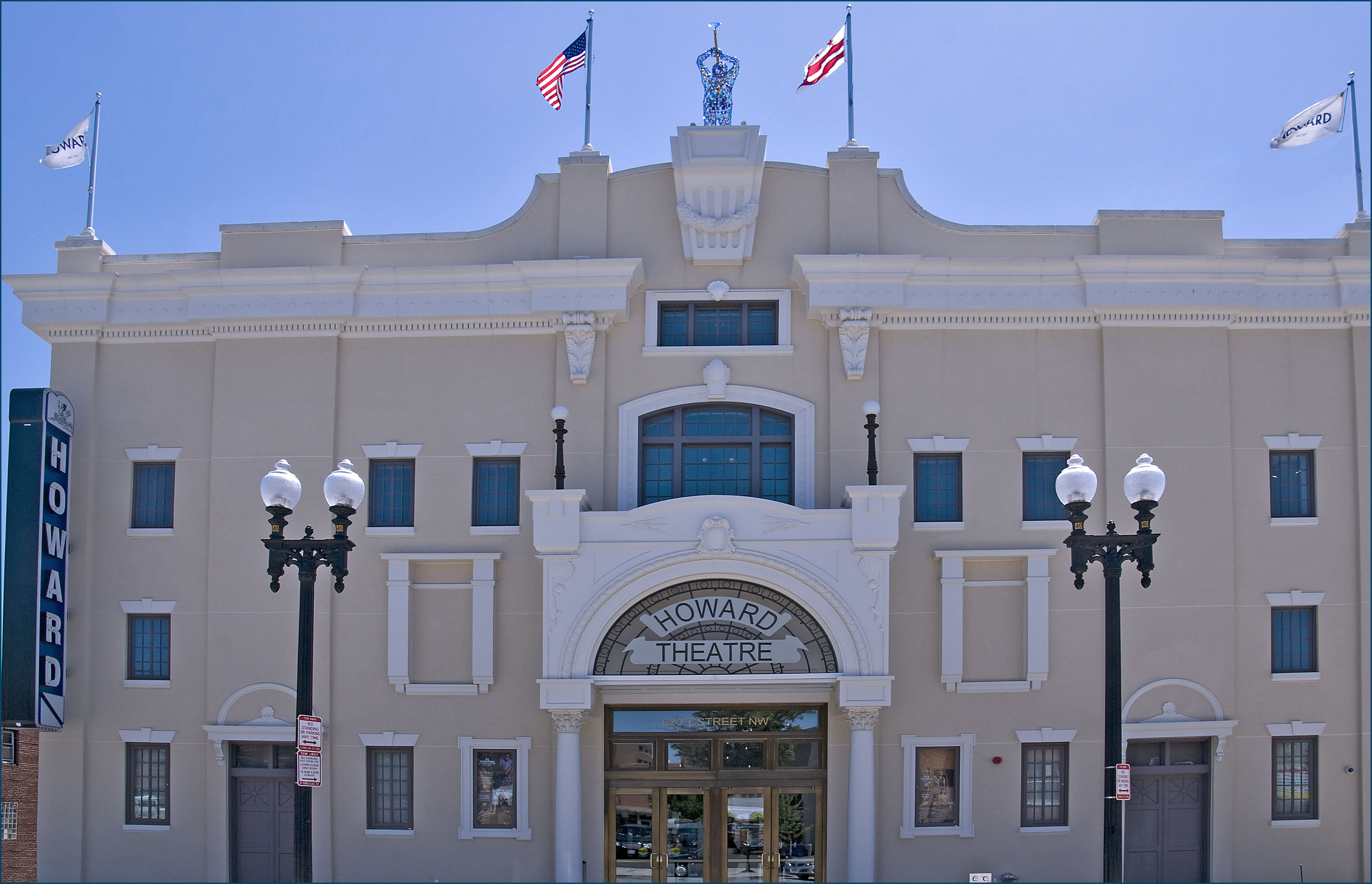
The historic Howard Theatre.

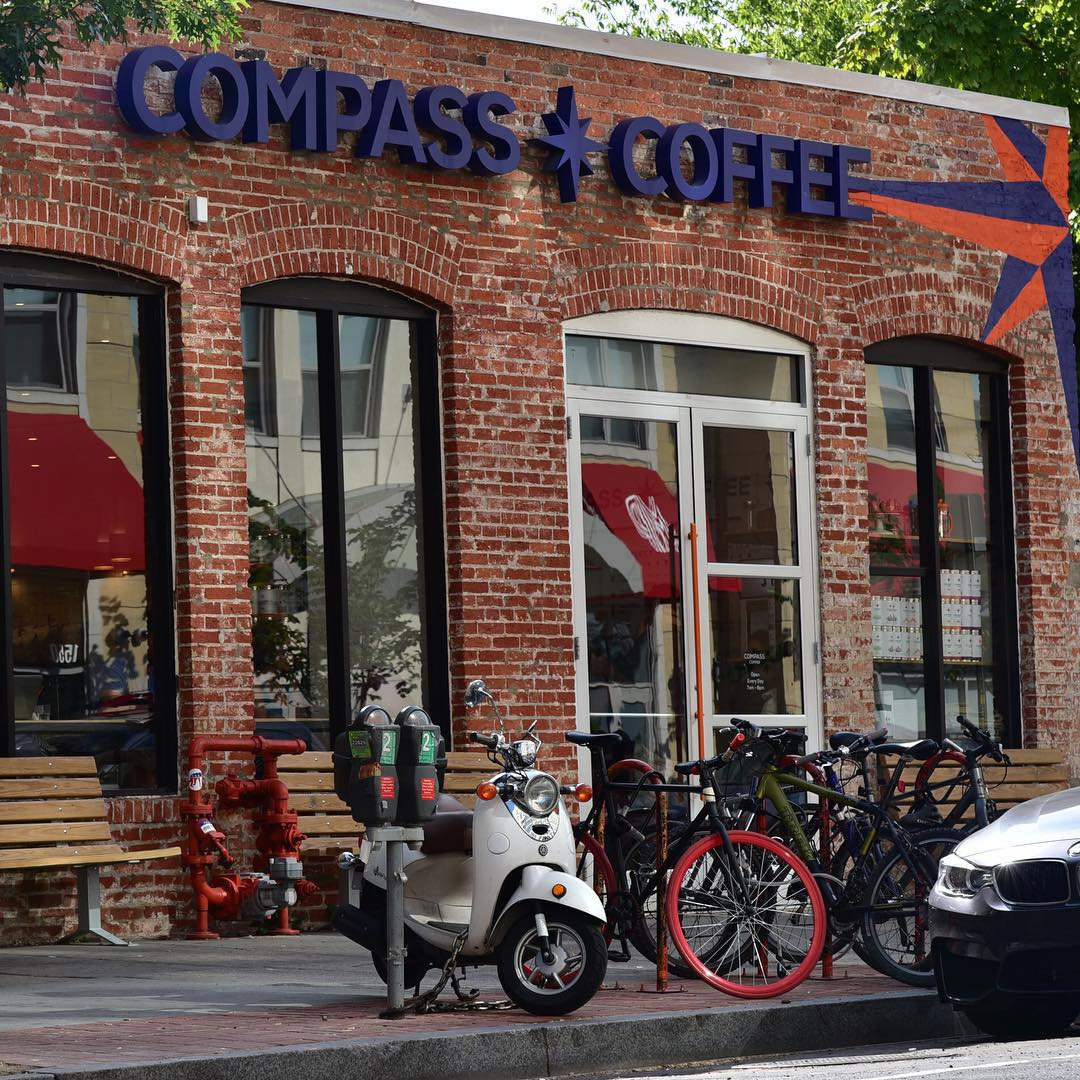
The original Compass Coffee

Shaw's neighborhood offers different cultural landmarks consisting of:

- Howard Theatre, owned by Abe Lichtman, a white owner of theaters that catered to African Americans, it was billed the "largest color theater in the World" in the 1970s. After restoration, it still hosts artists and performers in today's entertainment industry.
- Dunbar Theater, currently known as the Southern Aid Society, holds nearly 350 seats and was a popular venue for live entertainment, including many jazz and blues artists as well as movies. Originally opening in the 1920s, it was added to the National Register of Historic Places in 1968, shortly after closing in 1960.
- CityMarket at O (named "O Street Market" until 2008) is a Gothic Revival historic landmark, being one of the three public market buildings from the 19th century in DC; it won several awards for its design.
- The Shiloh Baptist Church, originally located in Fredericksburg (VA), plays an active part in helping, spiritually and economically, the Shaw's community. President Barack Obama and his family attended its Easter Sunday mass in 2011.
- The Watha T. Daniel/Shaw Neighborhood Library is a three-level library of which design was renovated in 2010 and received several awards for its excellence; it was also named as one of the top buildings of 2010 by The Wall Street Journal.
- The Walter E. Washington Convention Center, whose north portion is located in Shaw, has 703,000 square feet of exhibition space. It has hosted several official events including some hosted by President Barack Obama. It is also famous for its eco-friendly features. From 2017 to 2024, the WEWCC will be hosting Otakon.

=== Little Ethiopia ===
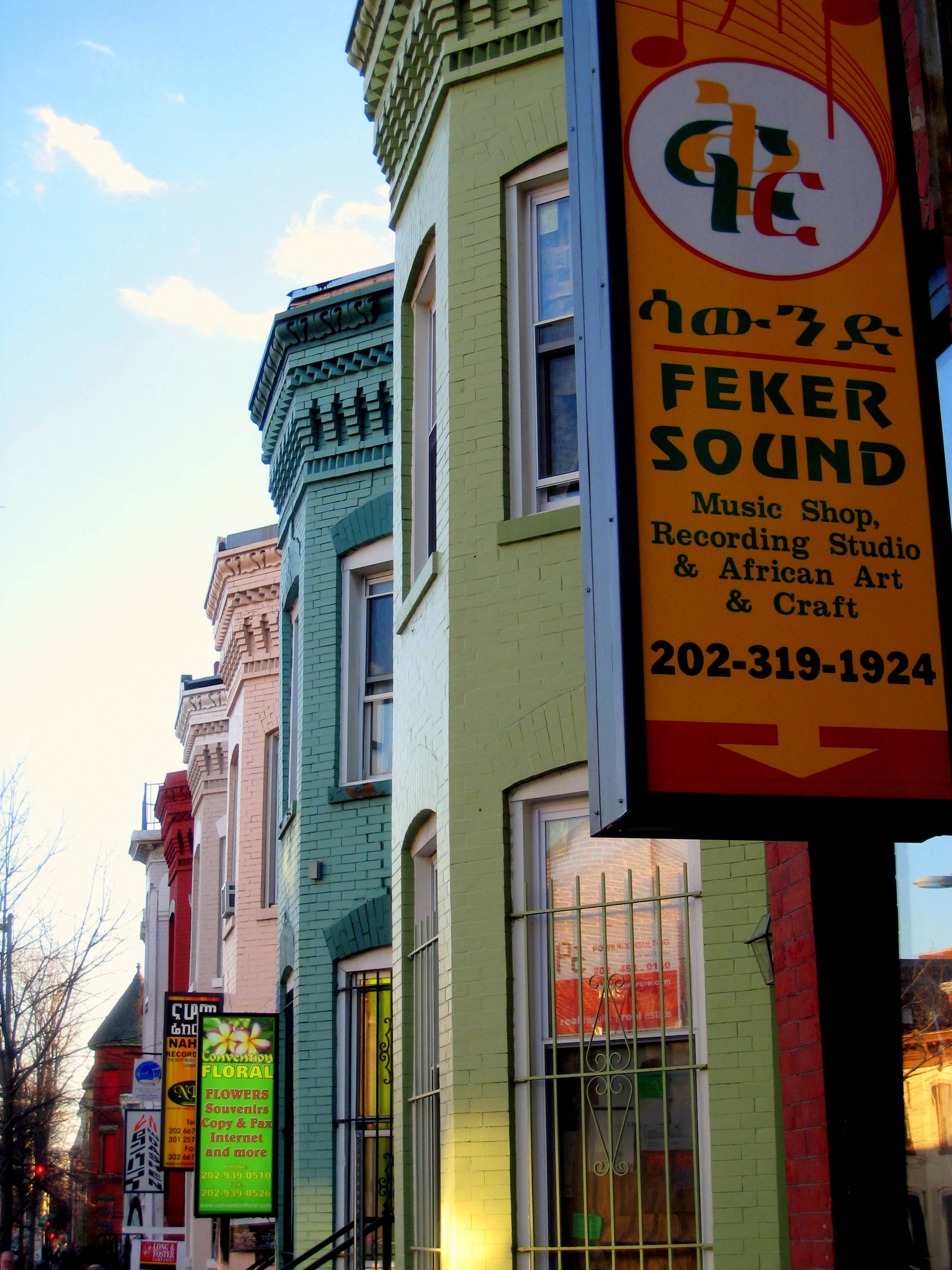
Little Ethiopia on 9th St.

Little Ethiopia is a sub-division of the Shaw neighborhood of Washington, D.C., located around 9th and U Street Northwest. It is known for its concentration of Ethiopian businesses and residents.

Since the 1980s, Ethiopian-born business owners have been purchasing property in the neighborhood of Shaw, specifically Thirteenth and Ninth Streets. The area has since gained distinctive popularity in Washington even outside of the Ethiopian community. According to restaurant owner Tefera Zewdie: "I remember it was if I'm not mistaken somewhere between 2000, 2001 it was something big for us to see one non-Ethiopian coming to the restaurant. Now 95 percent of them are non-Ethiopian." The food has become a main attraction and reason for locals and tourists to commute to Shaw and experience the many local Ethiopian restaurants. The influx of Ethiopians revitalized the area, prompting members of the Ethiopian American community to lobby the city government to officially designate the block as "Little Ethiopia". A DC Council Resolution officially recognizing the Ethiopian community in the area was passed in 2021.

== Parks and recreation ==
- Shaw Park, Shaw Dog Park, Cardozo Recreation Center
- Kennedy Recreation Center including a baseball field
- Bundy Field, Bundy Dog Park

== Demographics ==
Historical population
Census	Pop.	Note	%±
1950	34,208		—
1960	25,749		−24.7%
1970	19,994		−22.4%
1980	15,901		−20.5%
1990	15,044		−5.4%
2000	14,997		−0.3%
2010	17,639		17.6%

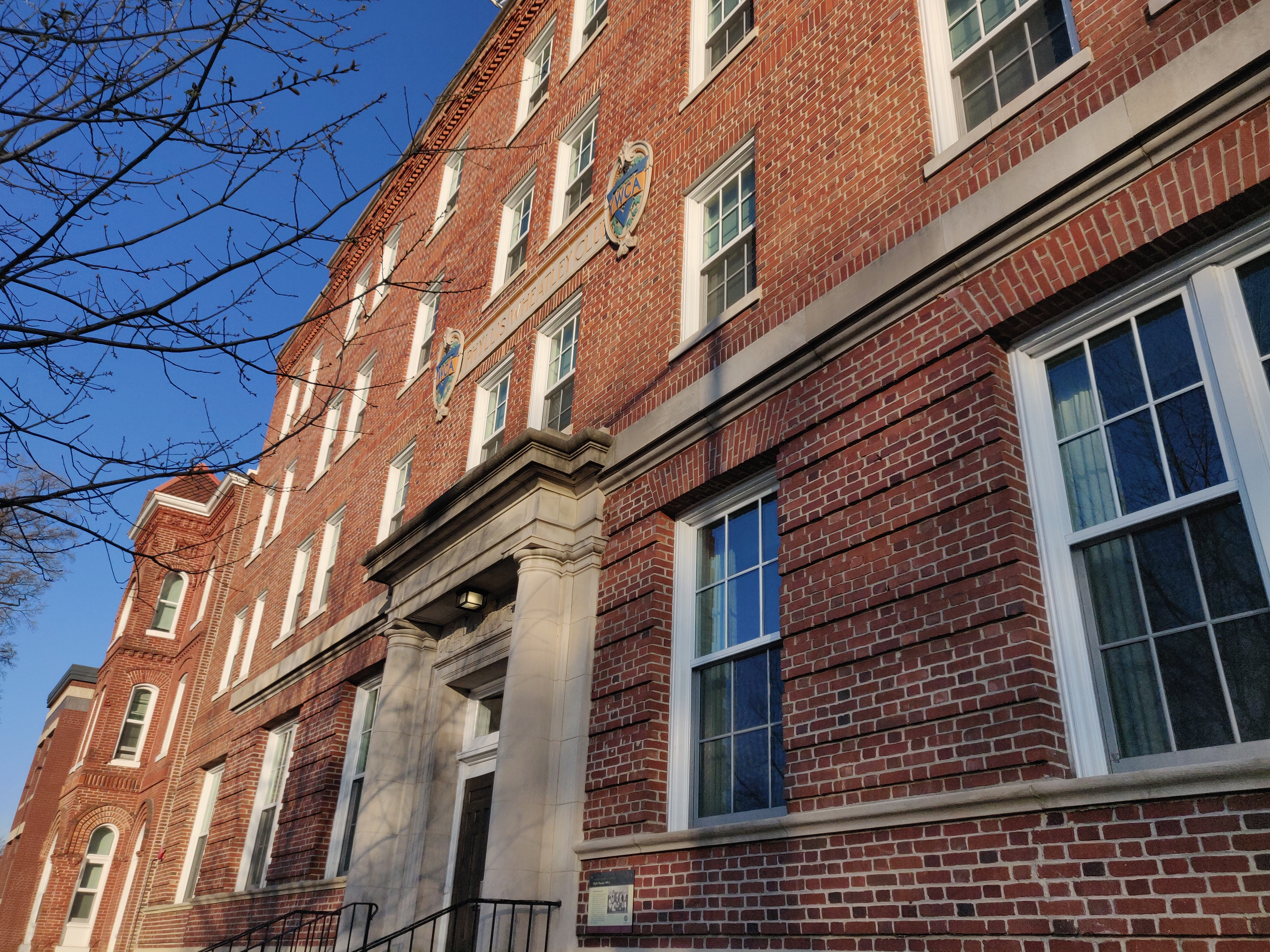
Phillis Wheatley YWCA

Shaw has grown dramatically since the mid-to-late 20th century, with a 2010 population of 17,639. In 1950, the area's population had reached over 34,000 people, around double its current level. Like many neighborhoods throughout Washington, D.C., Shaw hit a population low point in the 1980s and 1990s, rebounding considerably at the turn of the 21st century. The lack of investment and limited power in the area created a barrier in the neighborhood's development and urbanization during the early 1800s. Further growth was hindered by increasing racial tensions as more African-Americans settled in the region; by the 1850s, Washington, D.C., had the largest African-American population of any city in the United States. The increasing costs of housing also decreased the availability of affordable housing, generating further racial tensions citywide and neighborhood segregation. Although Shaw continues to be populated by many African-Americans, the price of housing experienced steady growth in the 2010s and early 2020s, which could lead to further displacement among the black community and a phenomenon known as root shock. According to the latest census of the Logan Circle/Shaw area, the majority of residents are single (71%) and college-educated (67%), with a median income of $84,875.

The majority of residents in Shaw are between the ages of 22 and 39; they constitute 44.5% of the population. This is greater than the average District of Columbia percentage of 34.5% for this age group. Children between the ages of 0 and 17 make up 15.4% of the population. The proportion of genders within each age group is generally equal except for the 85+ age group (which is 94.4% female and 5.6% male), and the 20-year-old group (which is 84.9% female and 15.1% male).

== Education ==
District of Columbia Public Schools – operates public schools.

District of Columbia Public Library – operates the Watha T. Daniel/Shaw Community Library.

== Transportation ==
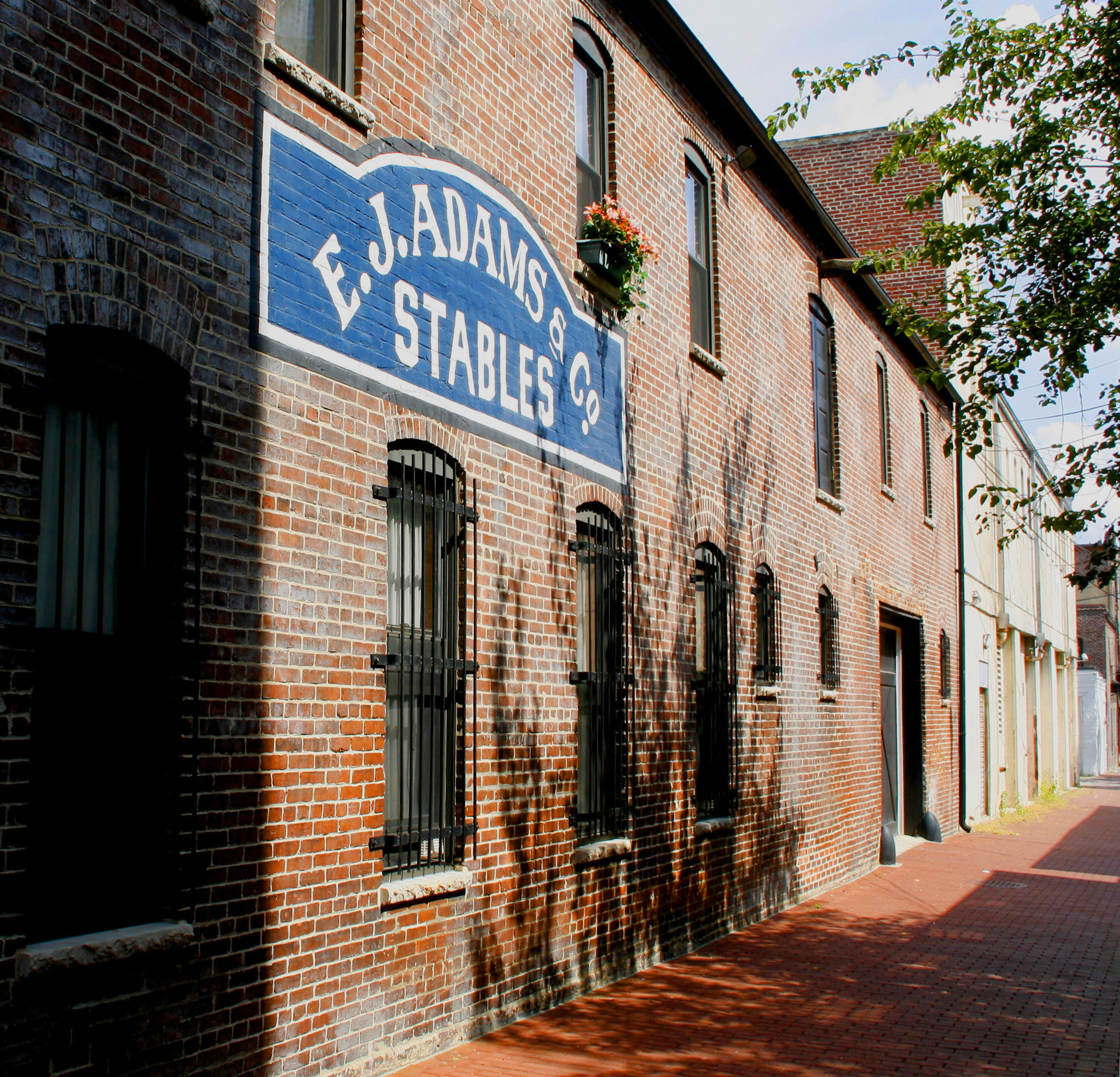
Blagden Alley & Naylor Court

Shaw neighborhood is served by the Green and Yellow lines of the Washington Metro with stops at Shaw-Howard University Station, U Street Station and Mount Vernon Square Station. There is a bus service within Shaw, which has several routes that connects the area with the Waterfront and Silver Spring via 7th Street. Also, the C91 LeDroit Park - Georgetown bus provides crosstown service between Georgetown University and Howard University. Freeway access allows cars to maneuver through the streets of Shaw.

Walk Score measures the Shaw neighborhood's transit with a score of 83 (classified as "excellent transit"), meaning transit is convenient for most trips. The White House, via public transit, is on average 10 minutes away from Shaw. Reagan National Airport, via public transit, is on average 28 minutes away from Shaw. Dulles International Airport, via cab, is on average 40 minutes away from Shaw.
