= Shaw Junior High School =

- U.S. National Register of Historic Places
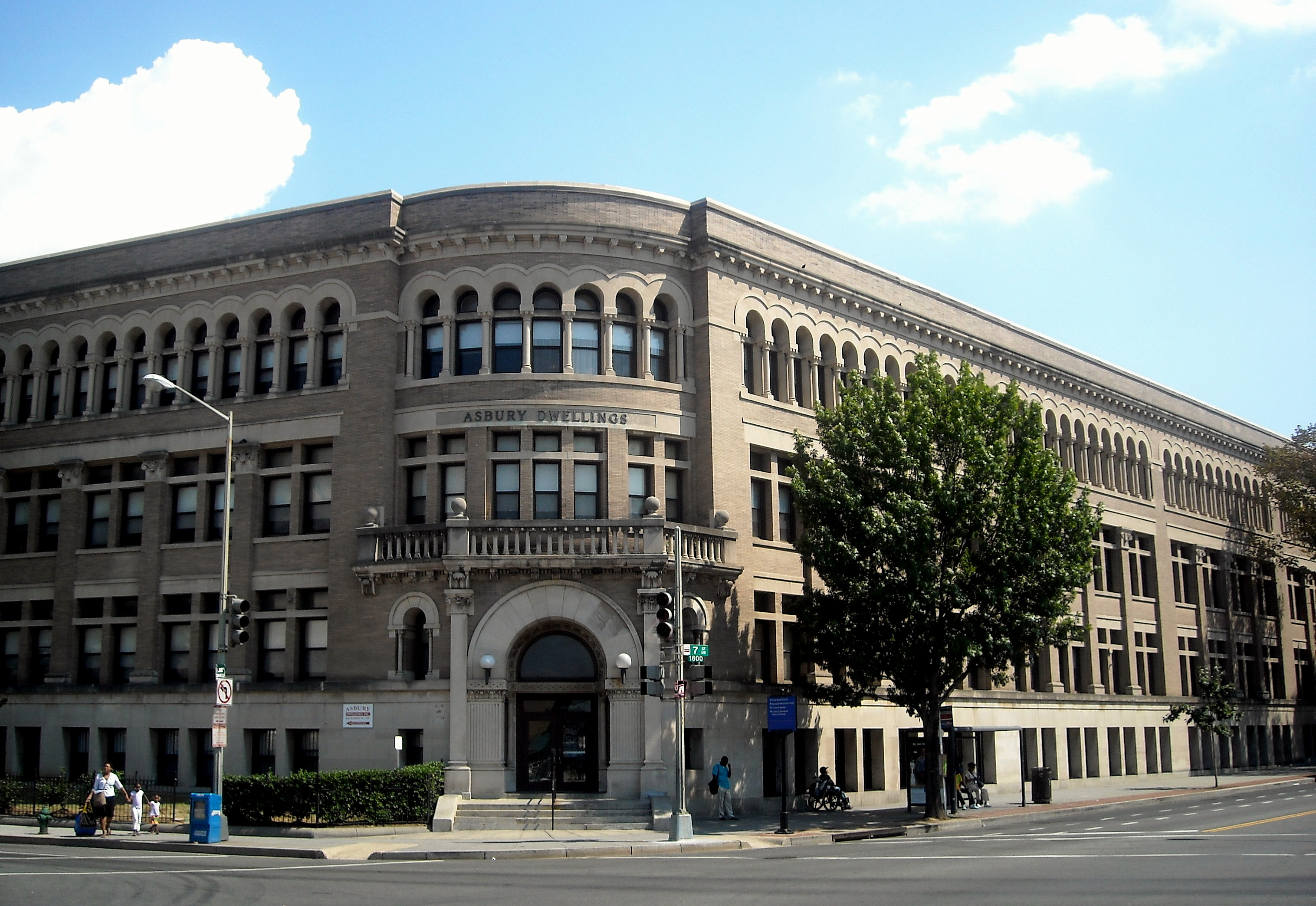

- Location within Washington, D.C.
- Location: 7th St. and Rhode Island Ave., NW; Washington, D.C.
- Coordinates: 38°54′44.11″N 77°1′18.93″W
- Built: 1902
- Architect: Henry Ives Cobb
- Architectural style: Romanesque Revival
- MPS: Public School Buildings of Washington, DC MPS
- NRHP reference No.: 08001206
- Added to NRHP: December 22, 2008

Shaw Junior High School, now known as Asbury Dwellings, is a historic structure located in the Shaw neighborhood of Washington, D.C. It has been listed on the District of Columbia Inventory of Historic Sites and on the National Register of Historic Places since 2008.

== History ==
The school was named after Robert Gould Shaw, who led the 54th Massachusetts Infantry Regiment, one of the first official African American units during the American Civil War.

From 1902 until 1928 the building housed the William McKinley Manual Training School. It was a school for white students and opened the same time as Armstrong Manual Training School for African Americans. They were part of an educational trend that began in the late 19th century of developing schools that taught industrial education along with the more traditional academic curriculum that prepared students for college. When McKinley moved to a larger campus in 1928 the building became Robert Gould Shaw Junior High School, which had previously opened for black students on M Street in 1921. The new Shaw was also a blacks-only school until segregation ended, but it remained primarily African-American. The school became overcrowded and poorly maintained. As it started to deteriorate the building was referred to as “Shameful Shaw.” It was illustrative of the city's neglect of African Americans. In 1977, Shaw was moved to a new school at 9th Street and Rhode Island Avenue NW. In 2008, Shaw again moved, this time to the Garnet-Patterson school building at 10th and V Streets NW, where it became known as Shaw Middle School at Garnet-Patterson. In 2013, Shaw at Garnet-Patterson closed due to low enrollment following the murder of its principal, Brian Betts. Shaw had a prolific music program with its band marching in the Macy's parade, the Rose Bowl and the Gimbel's parade in Philadelphia, PA. The band was directed by Mr. Lloyd Hoover. The old Shaw Junior High building now houses apartments.

== Name of Shaw neighborhood ==
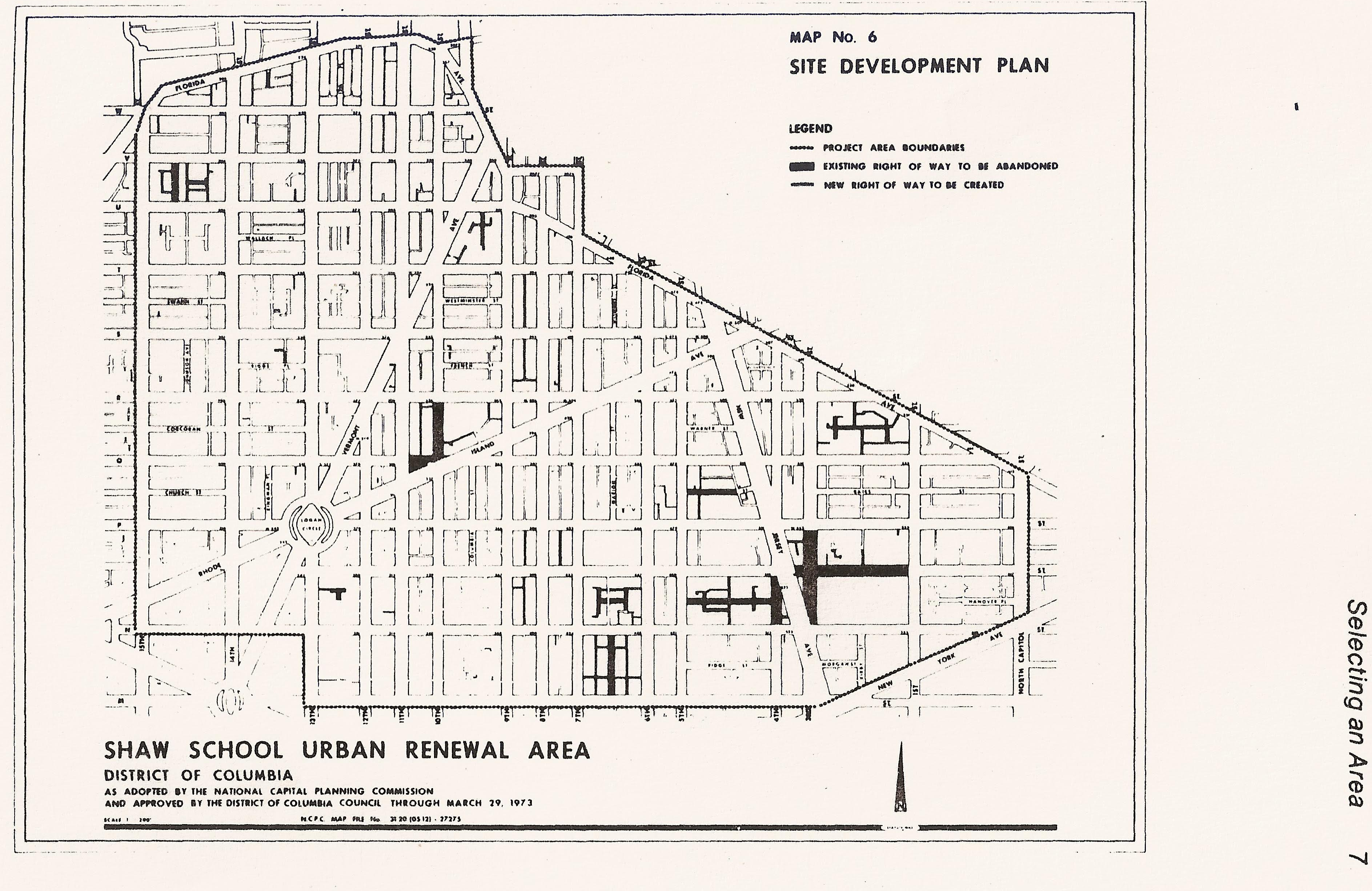
Map of the Shaw School Urban Renewal Area from which the concept of a Shaw neighborhood was derived. Includes the U Street and Logan Circle areas

Until the 1960s, what is now Shaw was called Midcity. In 1966, planners used the enrollment boundary of Shaw Junior High School to define the Shaw School Urban Renewal Area – which created a concept of a "Shaw neighborhood" larger than what is generally considered Shaw today, covering today's core Shaw neighborhood, the U Street Corridor, Logan Circle and Truxton Circle.

== Architecture ==
The building was designed by architect Henry Ives Cobb. It is part of the city's effort to hire private architects to improve the designs of public schools. The exterior is composed of buff-colored brick and limestone trim. It features an arcade of Romanesque arches on the third floor.
