= Weddington Castle =

Former manor house in Warwickshire, England

Coordinates: 52.5357°N 1.4684°W

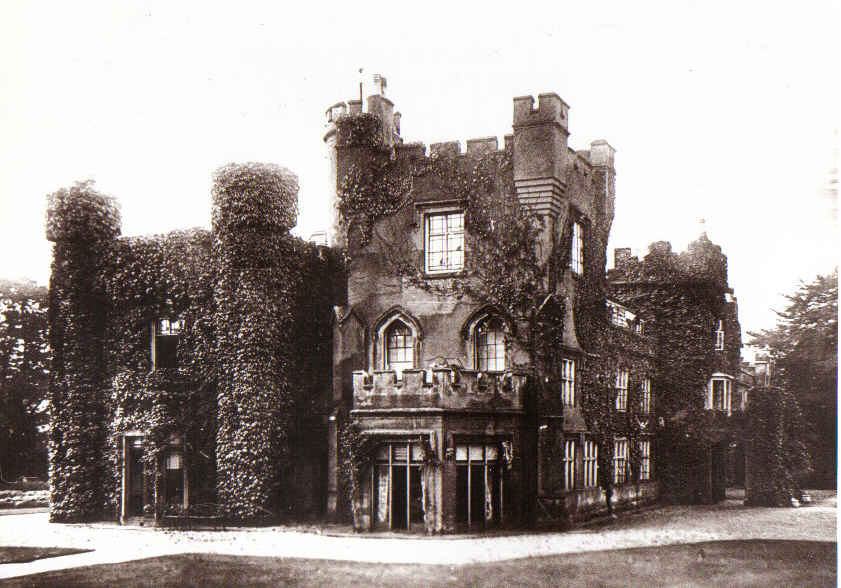
Weddington Castle

Weddington Castle, or Weddington Hall, was a manor house in the village of Weddington, Nuneaton in Warwickshire.

Evolving from a Royal Hunting Lodge in the ancient village of Weddington to become an extensive fortified Hall set amidst landscaped gardens, this centuries-old building was demolished in 1928 to make way for a housing estate.

Earliest references to Weddington Castle date from 1566, when it was mentioned in a suit. Only conjectures can be made about its history. It is believed to have been built by Thomas, Marquess of Dorset. In 1491, he enclosed the entire manor of Weddington, converted the entire piece of land to pasture, in the process turning 300 acres fallow. Records also tell of ten houses being left to go to ruins and over 60 people chased out of their homes.

The manor changed hands after Thomas's son, the Duke of Suffolk, forfeited. The Crown leased the manor until 1561 to a certain Mr. Trye, who rebuilt the village, turning it into a farming commune. In 1730, there were four farmhouses and the castle in the manor. The manor of Weddington never truly was heavily populated; even in 1901 there were hardly a hundred people living there. Only recently, with the development of Nuneaton, have houses cropped up and the population begin to rise.

Sir Samuel St. Swithin Burden Whalley (15 July 1799 – 3 February 1883) was a British Radical politician. Born into a Lancashire family "of great antiquity", he was the son of Samuel Whalley of Weddington Hall, Warwickshire.

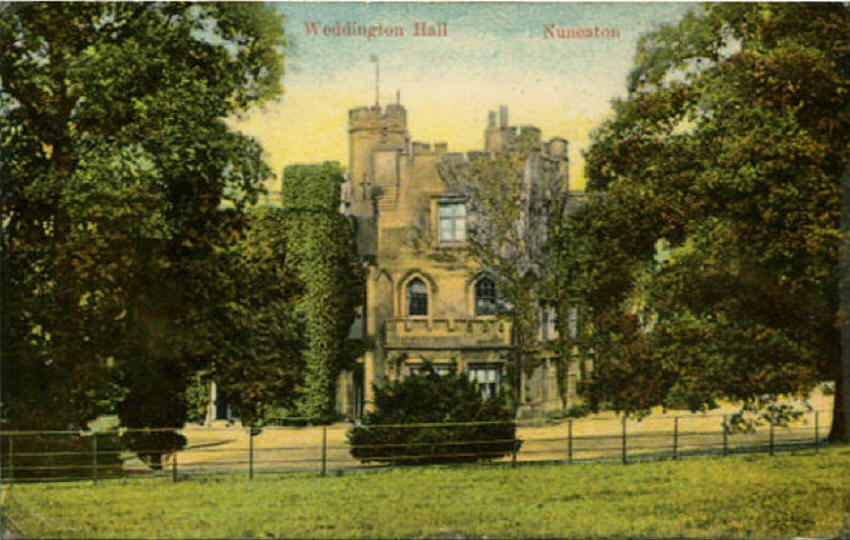
An early colour photograph of Weddington Castle.

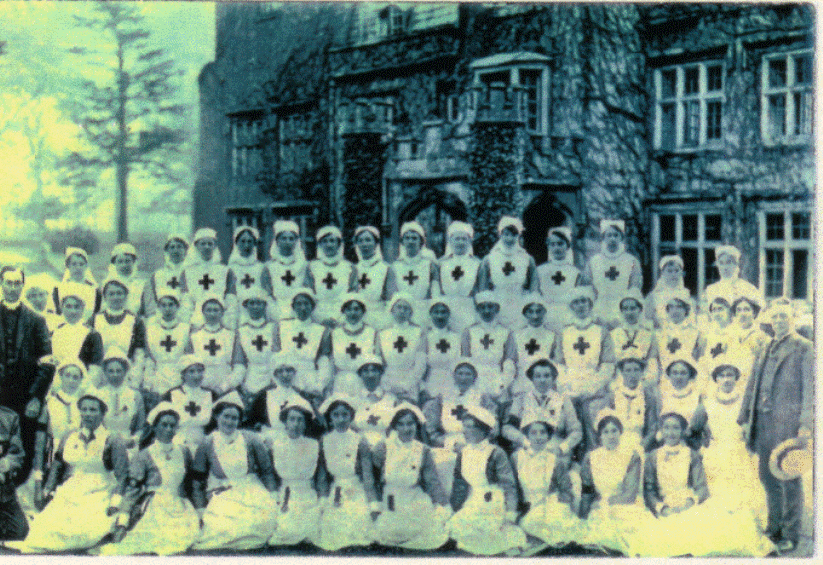
Weddington Castle as a Red Cross hospital during WW1
