= Shaw College at Detroit =

Defunct private university in Michigan

Shaw College at Detroit was an institution of higher education in Detroit that existed from 1936 until 1983.

== History ==
The institution was originally established as Michigan Lutheran College in 1936, but it closed in 1970 due to debt. Shaw University of Raleigh, N.C., had already been in talks to open an extension in Detroit before the closure, so the name was adopted.

Shaw College purchased the Basso Building in April 1976. The building was used for administrative offices and student services.
