= The Afro-Colombian Mural: Currulao y Desplazamiento =

Mural by Joel Bergner in Washington, D.C.

- Artist: Joel Bergner
- Year: 2009
- Type: Mural
- Location: U Street, Washington, DC

The Afro-Colombian Mural: Currulao y Desplazamiento, located at 1344 U Street NW, Washington D.C., is a public mural that celebrates the Afro-Colombian culture of the District and increases public awareness about the widespread displacement and other human rights violations related to the ongoing armed conflict in Colombia. The mural was funded by the DC Commission on the Arts and Humanities.

== The artist and inspiration for the mural ==
The mural was made by the internationally recognized muralist Joel Bergner and his organization Action Ashé! Global Art & Social Action Initiative. Bergner collaborated with many D.C. Afro-Colombian community members who had fled Colombia to seek asylum status in the US, and sought their guidance in how to best illustrate the grave human rights situation in that country.

Bergner also traveled to the Pacific Coast region of Colombia where the conflict is often most severe to visit his friends’ families, do research, and learn more about the political situation. This trip greatly contributed to the mural's imagery.

The woman and the figures beneath her are depicted at a large scale, which has been interpreted as representing the importance of Afro-Colombian traditions and culture. The mural's imagery has been described as contrasting with its depiction of the Colombian paramilitary and people fleeing from those forces.

== Public reception ==
The mural was unveiled at with a public event featuring speeches from the Afro-Colombian activist Marino Córdoba and a local DC council member, as well as live music, traditional Afro-Colombian food, and a traditional dance presentation by the local Afro-Colombian dance group Tangaré. The event was co-sponsored by TransAfrica Forum and the US Network in Solidarity for Afro-Colombian Grassroots Communities (NASGACC)].
