= Funk Parade =

Annual music and art street festival in Washington, D.C.

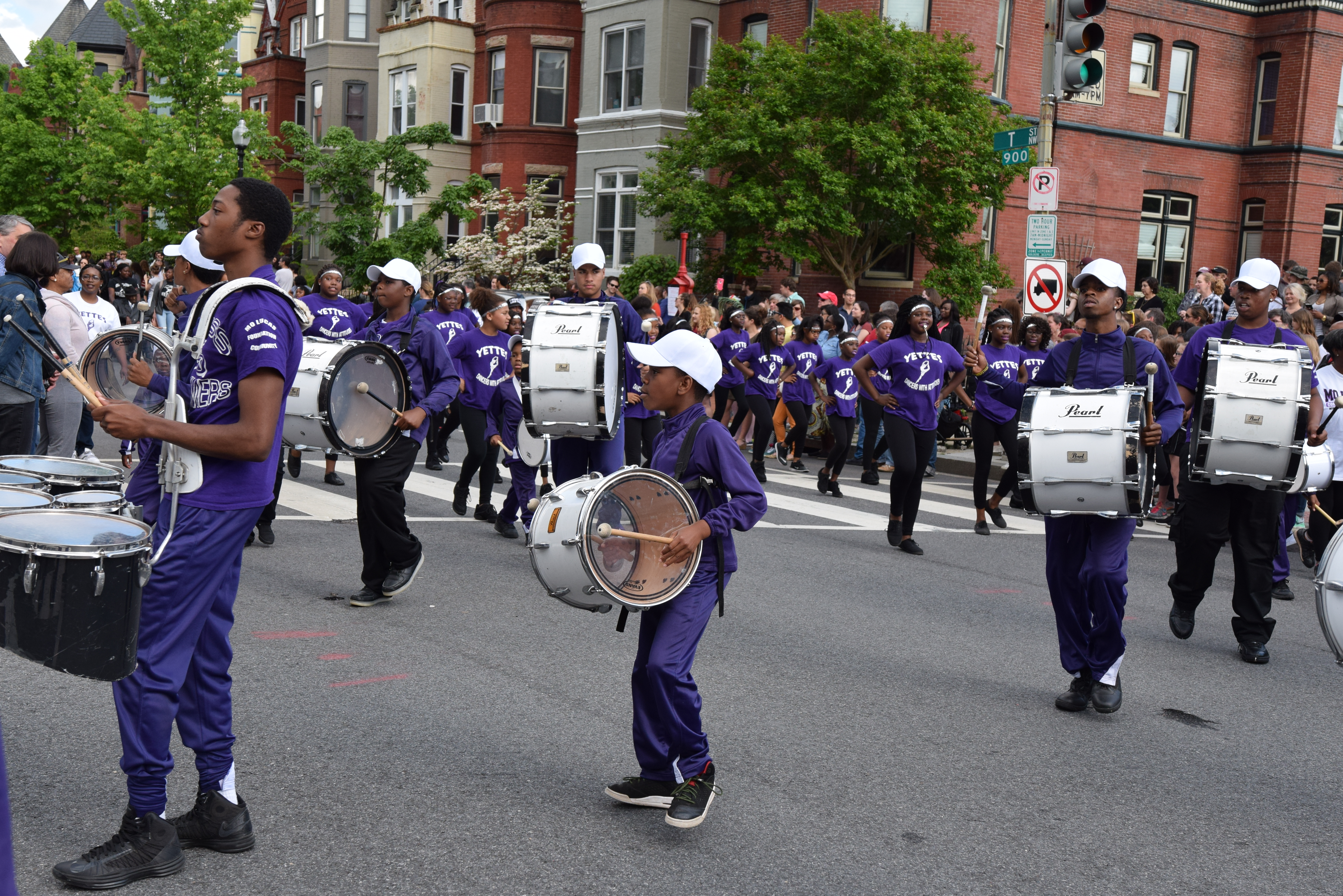
Scene from the 2016 Funk Parade

The Washington DC Funk Parade is an annual music and art street festival held on U Street in Washington DC. It is a free, day-long event that aims to unite the community through the celebration of funk music, visual arts and the diverse cultural history of the U Street neighborhood. The event features various live musical performances, live art demonstrations, community workshops and food vendors. The Funk Parade, in which dancers, marching bands, beat-boxers and various other creative art forms, closes the festival in the afternoon.

== History ==
The first Funk Parade was held on May 3, 2014. The co-founders of the event are Justin Rood and Chris Naoum, who brought together many city businesses, venues, art and community organizations to create the event. In 2014, DC government forced the parade to follow a narrow and crowded route down V Street NW, but the 2015 parade took place on the main fair of U Street.

According to founders Rood and Naoum, the parade is meant to bring together all different types of DC community members to celebrate the city's musical history and the historical importance of U Street. DC natives Marvin Gaye and Duke Ellington are commonly seen as some of the most significant musicians to transform the music culture of U Street, making it the heart of live music in DC.

== Events ==
The 2014 Funk Parade attracted more than 25,000 people.

The 2015 Funk Parade began at the beginning of 14th and U Streets all the way to the Howard Theatre at 7th Street and Florida Avenue. The event started off with the Day Fair, showcasing over 50 performing groups and food vendors from 12pm to 5pm. The parade began at 5pm outside the Howard Theatre and showcased local student marching bands including the Duke Ellington Radical Elite Show Band and Batala D.C. The parade ended at the Lincoln Theatre at 7pm, and was followed by more music performances at venues along U Street. The afterparty, beginning at 10pm, featured music groups Trouble Funk, Lee Fields and DJ Nitekrawler.

The 2017 4th Annual Funk Parade was Hosted by David "The Oh!" Oliver and Co-host Tia Cherie Polite. She also hosted The Costume Lounge along with Wendell Smith Sr.

The 2022 Funk Parade was the first in-person festival since the COVID-19 pandemic.
