= U Street (Washington, D.C.) =

Historic district in Washington D.C.

U Street Corridor
- Neighborhood of Washington, D.C.
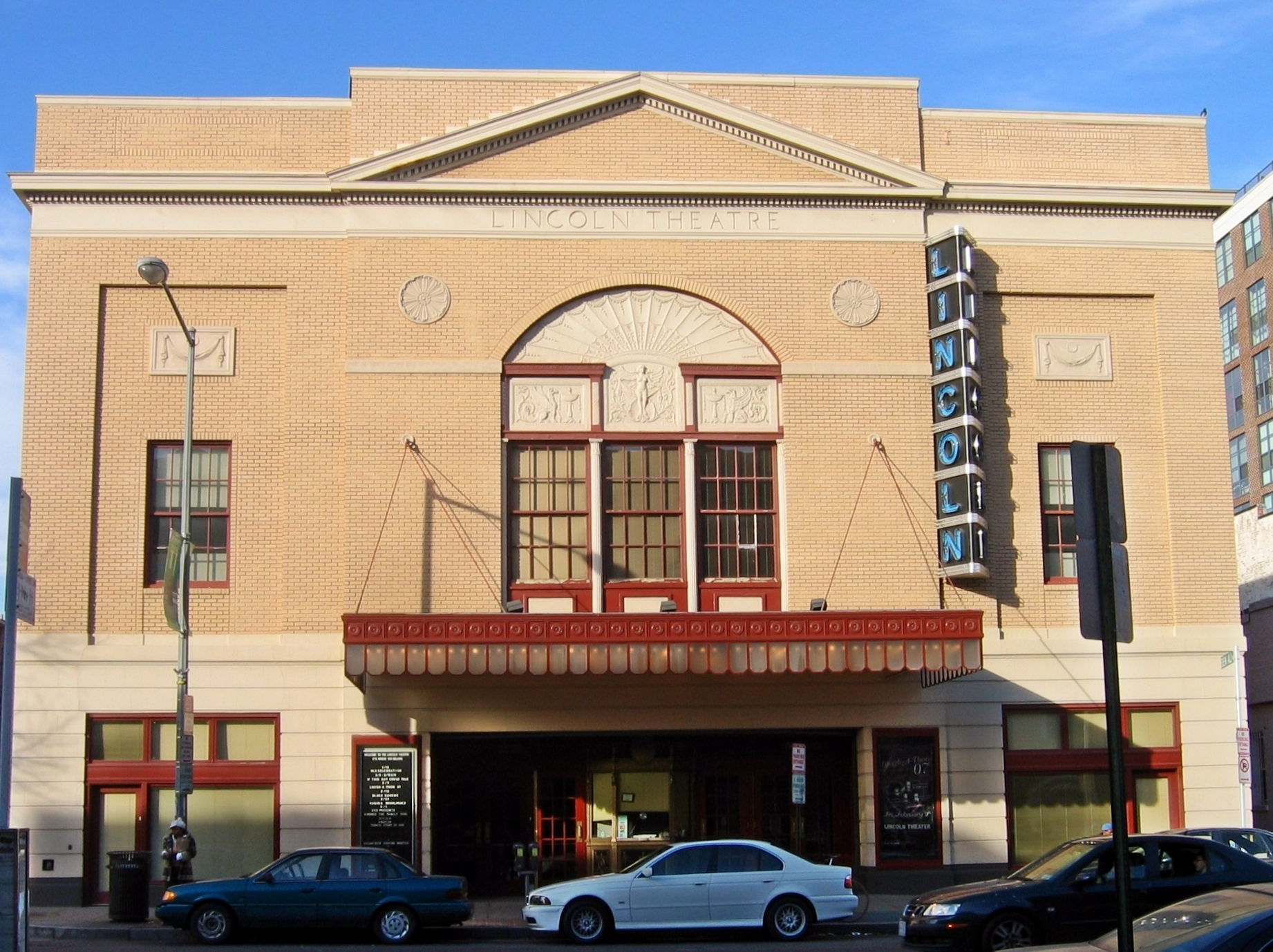
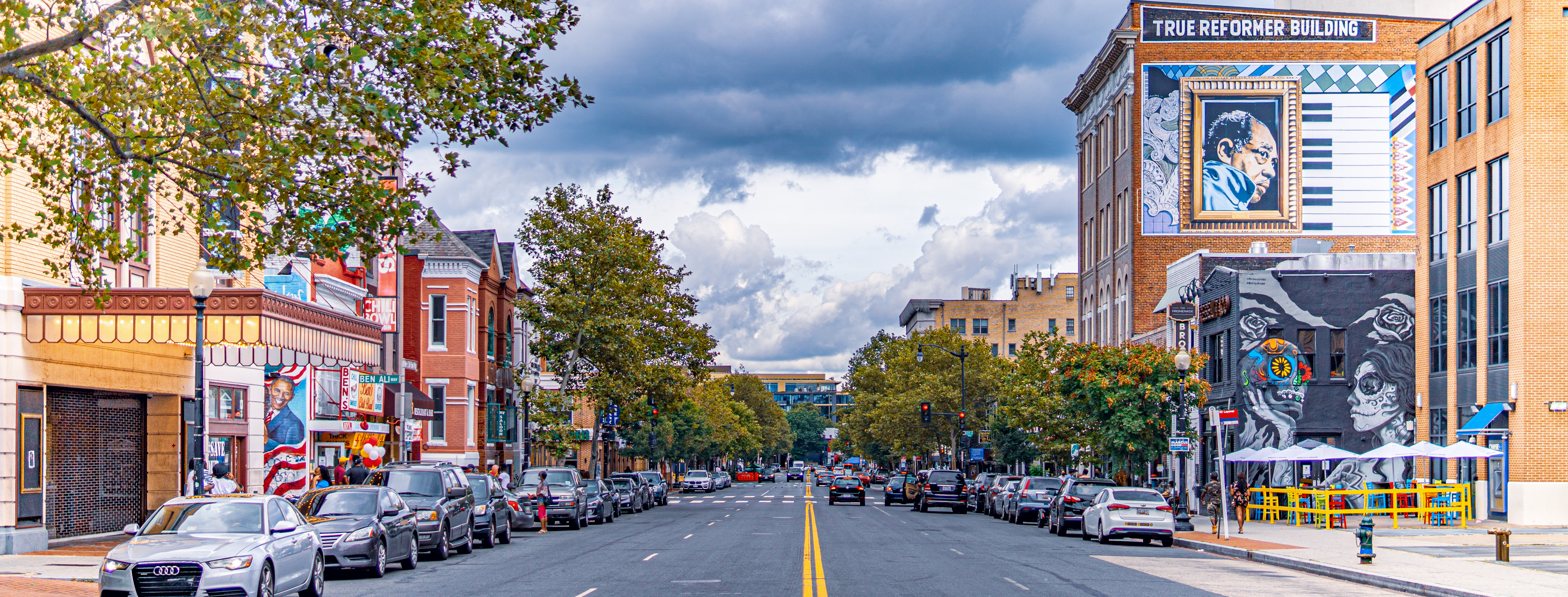
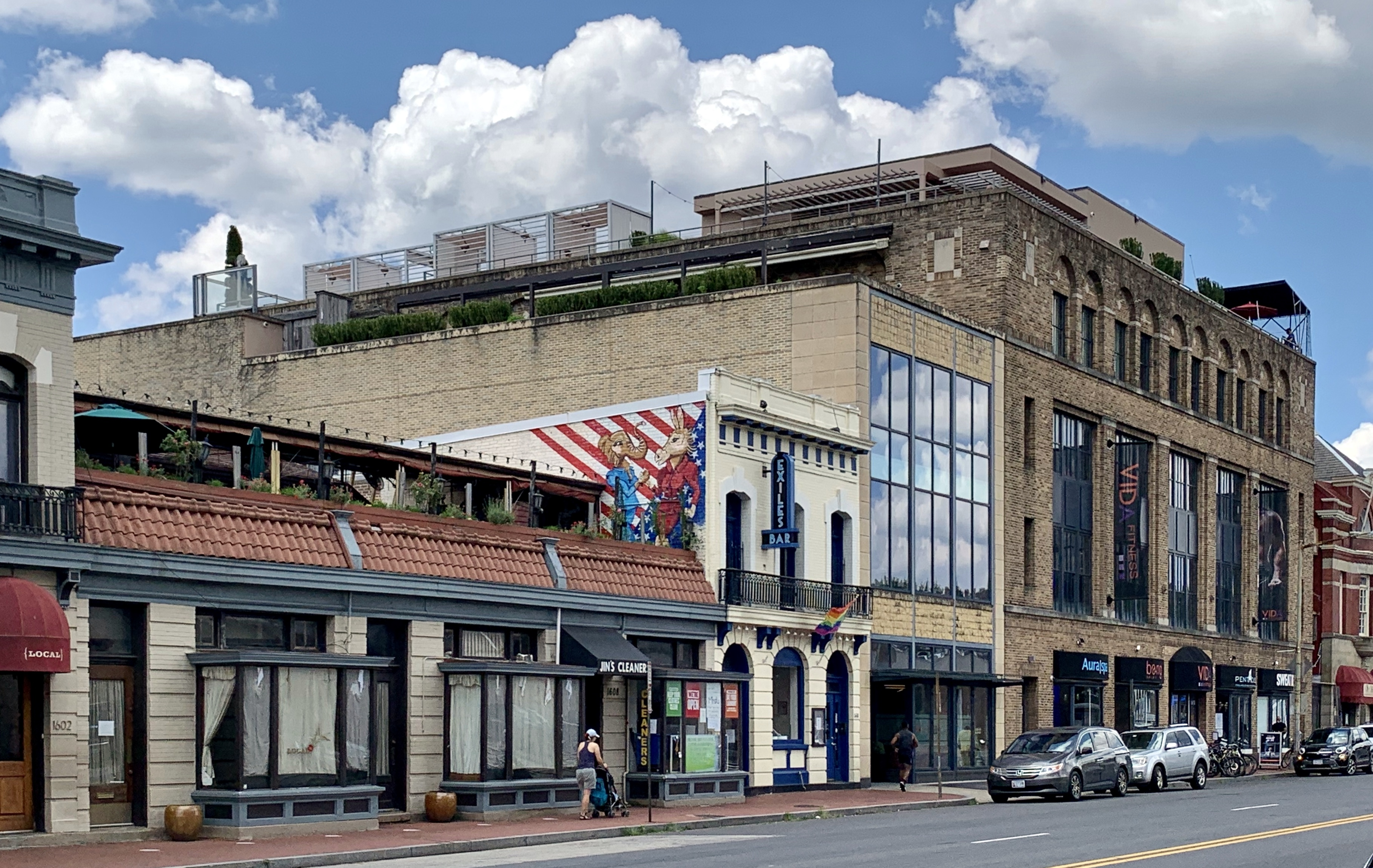
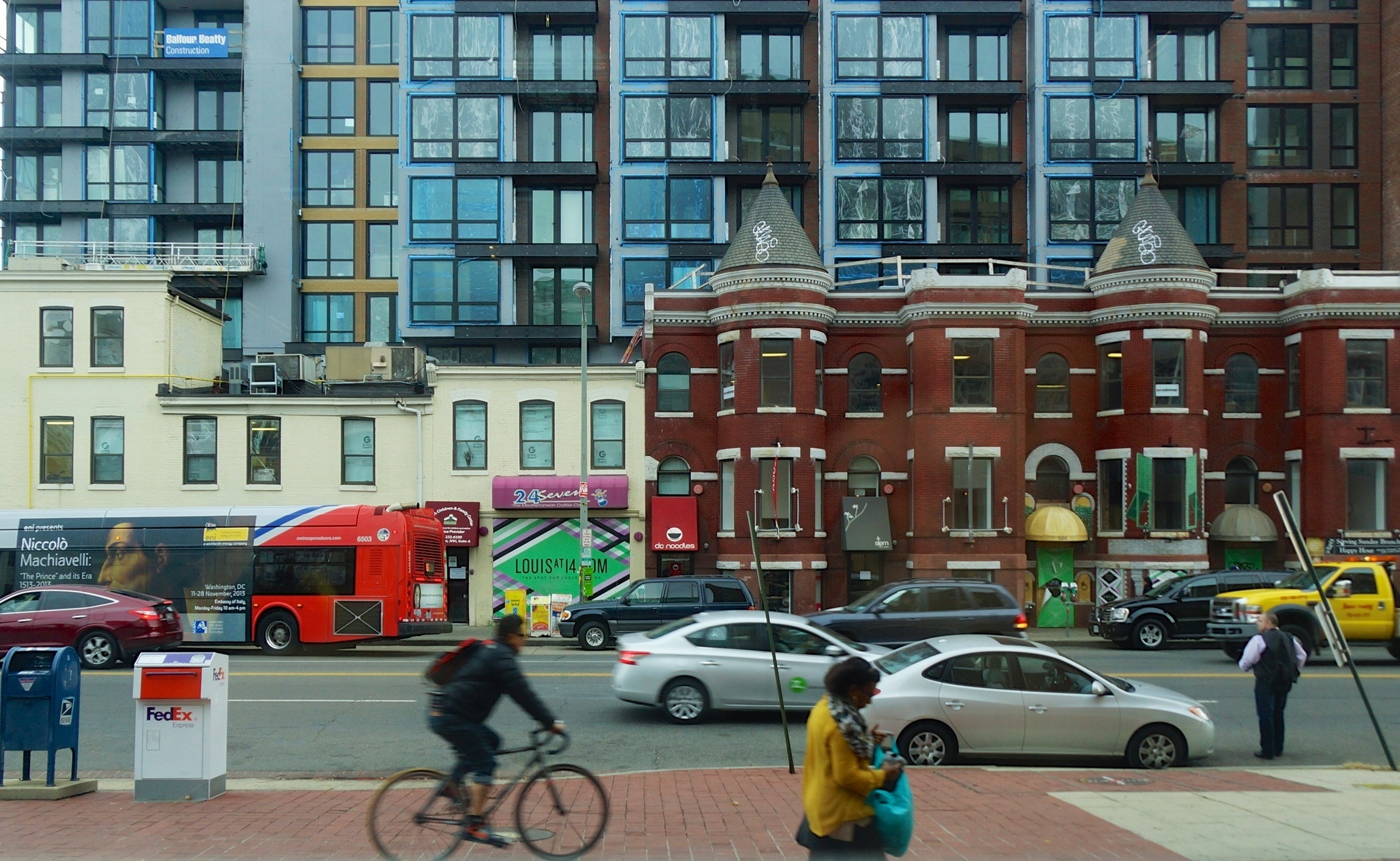
- Top: Lincoln Theatre (left) and Ben's Chili Bowl (right); middle: view of U Street; bottom: U Street by 16th Street (left) and U Street by 14th Street (right)
- Interactive map of U Street Corridor
- Coordinates: 38.917046°N 77.03293°W
- Country: United States
- District: Washington, D.C.
- Ward: Ward 1

Government
  - Councilmember: Brianne Nadeau (Ward 1)

Area
  - Total: .2 sq mi (0.52 km^{2})

Population (2017)
  - Total: 5,385
  - Density: 26,732/sq mi (10,321/km^{2})
- Postal code: ZIP code
- Website: https://washington.org/dc-neighborhoods/u-street

The U Street Corridor or Greater U Street, sometimes known as Cardozo/Shaw, is a neighborhood in Washington, D.C., located in Northwest D.C. Centered along U Street, the neighborhood is one of Washington's most popular nightlife and entertainment districts, as well as one of the most significant African American heritage districts in the country.

The area was largely built after the U.S. Civil War and with the arrival of the Washington streetcar system in the 1880s, the neighborhood development boomed. By 1920, the neighborhood was predominantly African-American and flourished as the "Black Broadway", the heart of African-American culture in Washington. The area declined for a period following the 1968 Washington riots, but recovered following the 1991 opening of the U Street station of the Washington Metro. Since the 2000s, the area has been subject to significant urban redevelopment and gentrification.

== History ==
=== 19th century ===
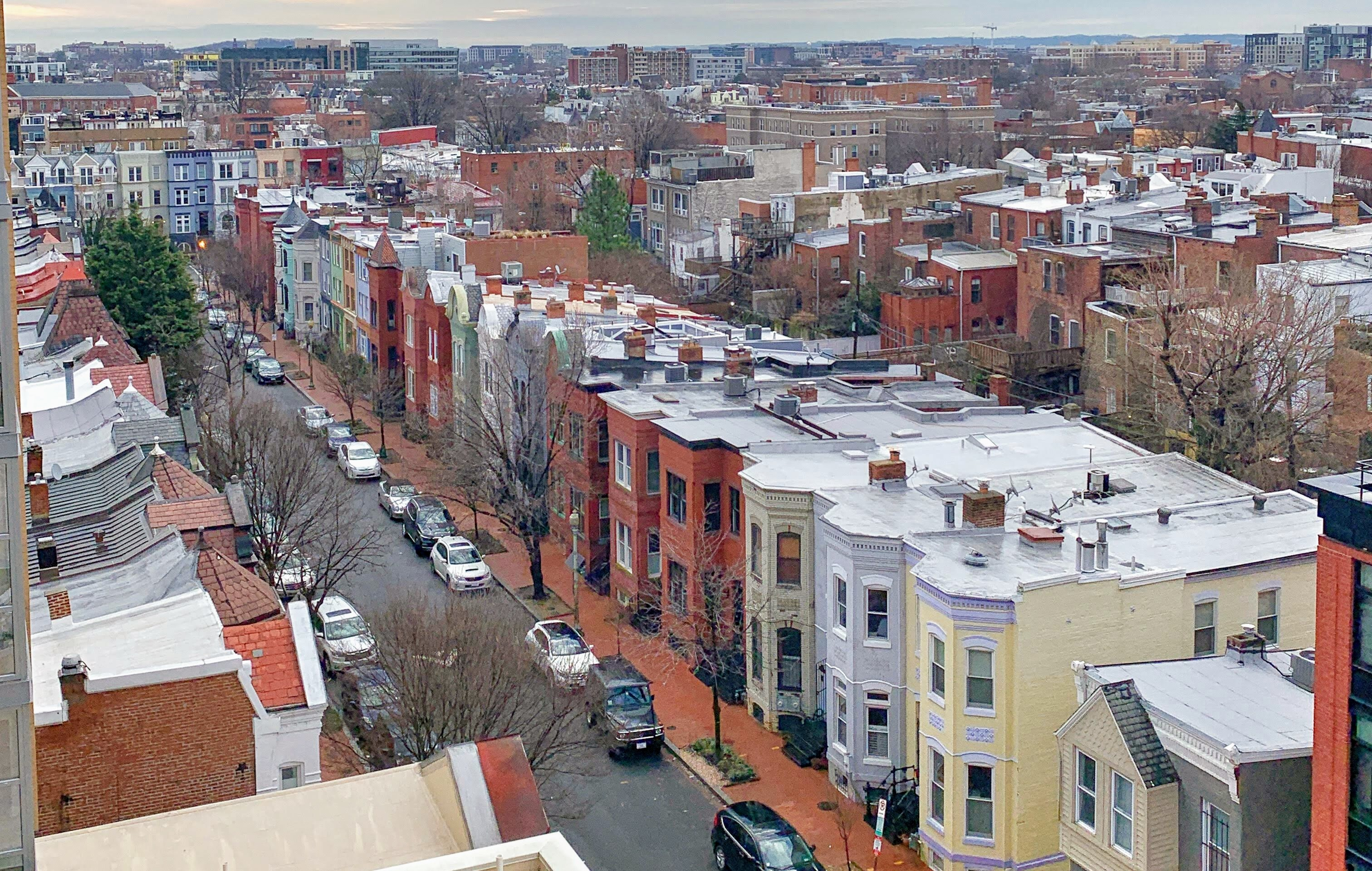
View of 19th-century Victorian rowhomes on Wallach Place.

U Street is a largely Victorian-era neighborhood, developed between 1862 and 1900, the majority of which has been designated as the Greater U Street historic district.

At the time of the Civil War, the area was woods and open fields. The Union command chose this area for military encampments including Camp Barker near 13th and R streets and others in what is now the Shaw neighborhood proper. The encampments were safe havens for freed slaves fleeing the South, and thus the area became a popular one for African Americans to settle.

After the war, horse-drawn streetcar lines opened, running north from downtown Washington along 7th, 9th and 14th streets, making the area an easily accessible place to live. The lines were later turned into cable cars. Both blacks and whites lived here, gradually shifting to a predominantly African American population between 1900 and 1920. The area's oldest buildings are Italianate, Second Empire and Queen Anne-style row houses built rapidly by speculative developers in response to the city's high demand for housing with the post-Civil War growth of the federal government.

=== Early 20th century ===
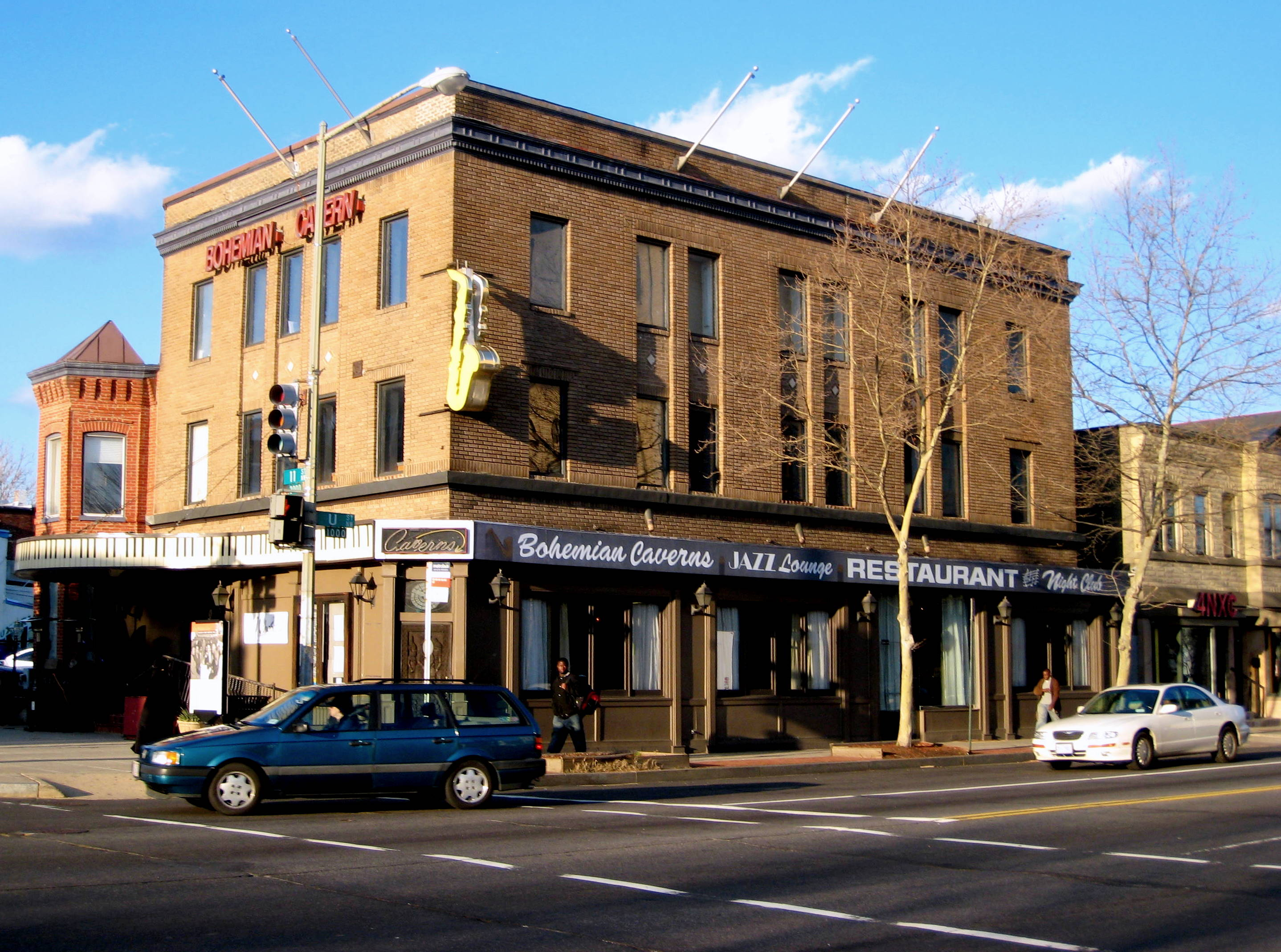
Bohemian Caverns hosted acts like Duke Ellington and Miles Davis.

Until the 1920s, when it was overtaken by Harlem, the U Street Corridor was home to the nation's largest urban African American community. The area was home to the Industrial Bank, the city's oldest African American-owned bank, and to hundreds of black-owned and black-friendly businesses, churches, theaters, gyms, and other community spaces. Natives of the area included jazz musician Duke Ellington, opera singer Lillian Evanti, surgeon Charles R. Drew, and law professor Charles Hamilton Houston.

In its cultural heyday – roughly consisting of the years between 1900 and the early 1960s – the U Street Corridor was known as "Black Broadway", a phrase coined by singer Pearl Bailey. Performers who played the local clubs of the era included Cab Calloway, Louis Armstrong, Miles Davis, Sarah Vaughan, Billie Holiday, and Jelly Roll Morton, among many others.

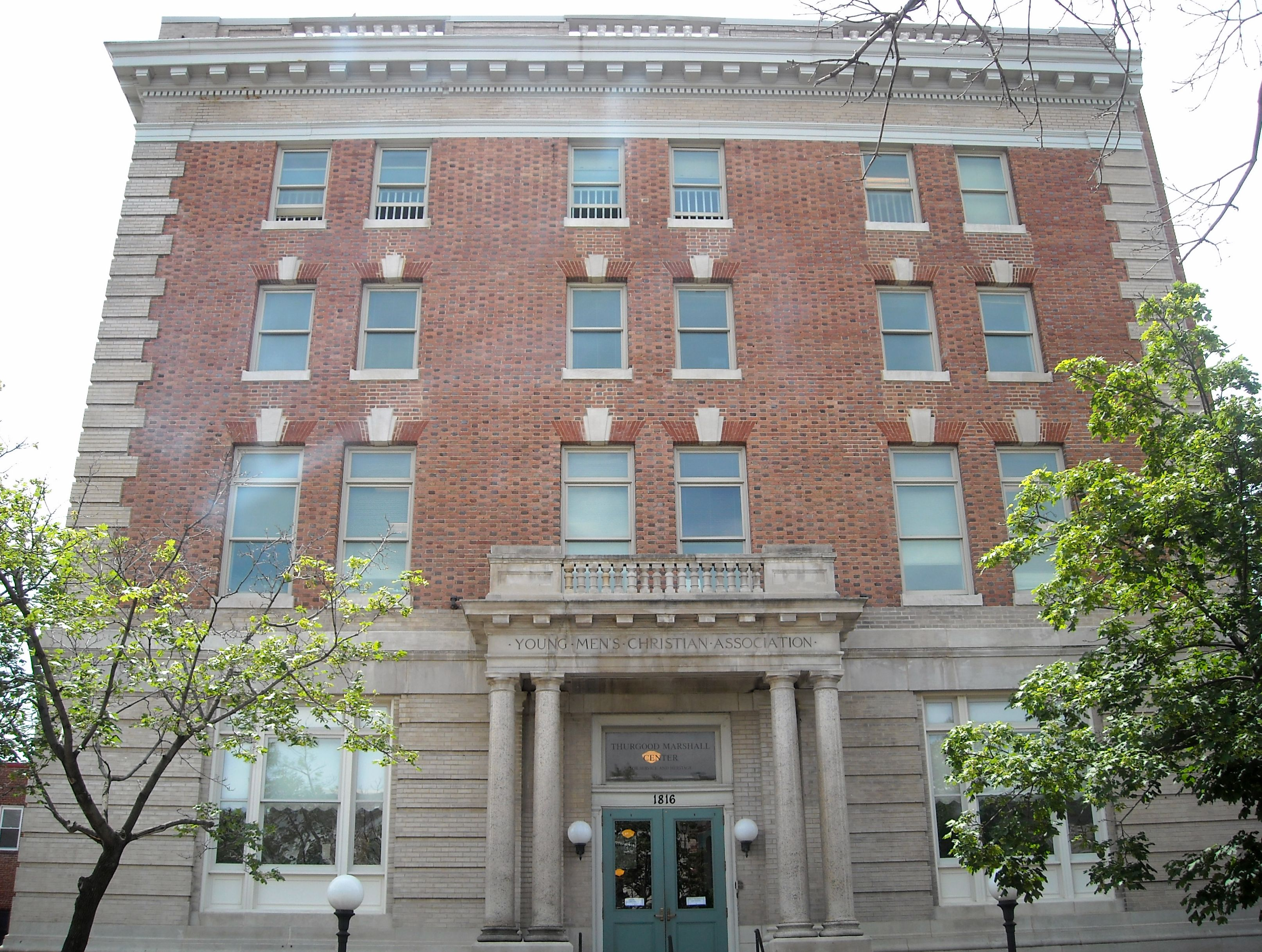
Thurgood Marshall Center

During Prohibition, U Street was also home to many of the capital's 2,000-3,000 speakeasies, which some historians credit for helping integrate a city long divided between black and white.

From 1911 to 1963, the west end of the U Street neighborhood was anchored by Griffith Stadium, home of the District's baseball team, the Washington Senators. The Lincoln Theatre opened in 1921, and Howard Theatre in 1926. Duke Ellington's childhood home was located on 13th street between T and S Streets.

The Green Book, a travel guide for black travelers (1933–1963) listed many sites along U Street NW by Green Book Travelers.

=== Late 20th century ===
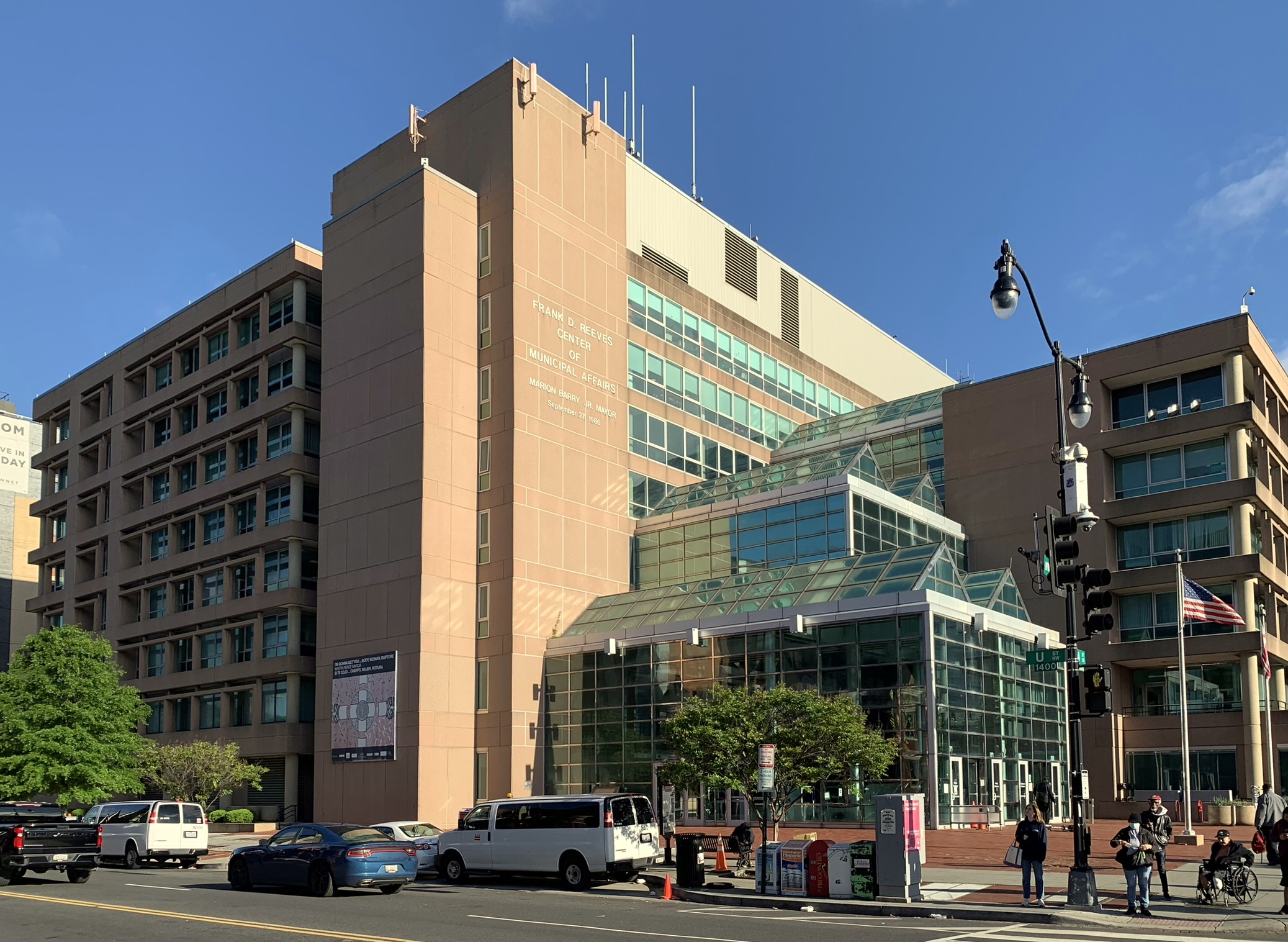
The Reeves Center, built in 1986.

While the area remained a cultural center for the African American community through the 1960s, the neighborhood began to decline following the assassination of Martin Luther King Jr. on 4 April 1968. The intersection of 14th Street and U Street was the epicenter of violence, 13 deaths and damage to 1,200 homes and businesses during the 1968 Washington, D.C. riots, which rampaged for four days after King's murder. Following the riots, and the subsequent flight of affluent residents and businesses from the area, the corridor became blighted. Drug trafficking rose dramatically in the mid-1970s, when the intersection of 14th and U Streets was an area of drug trafficking in Washington, D.C.

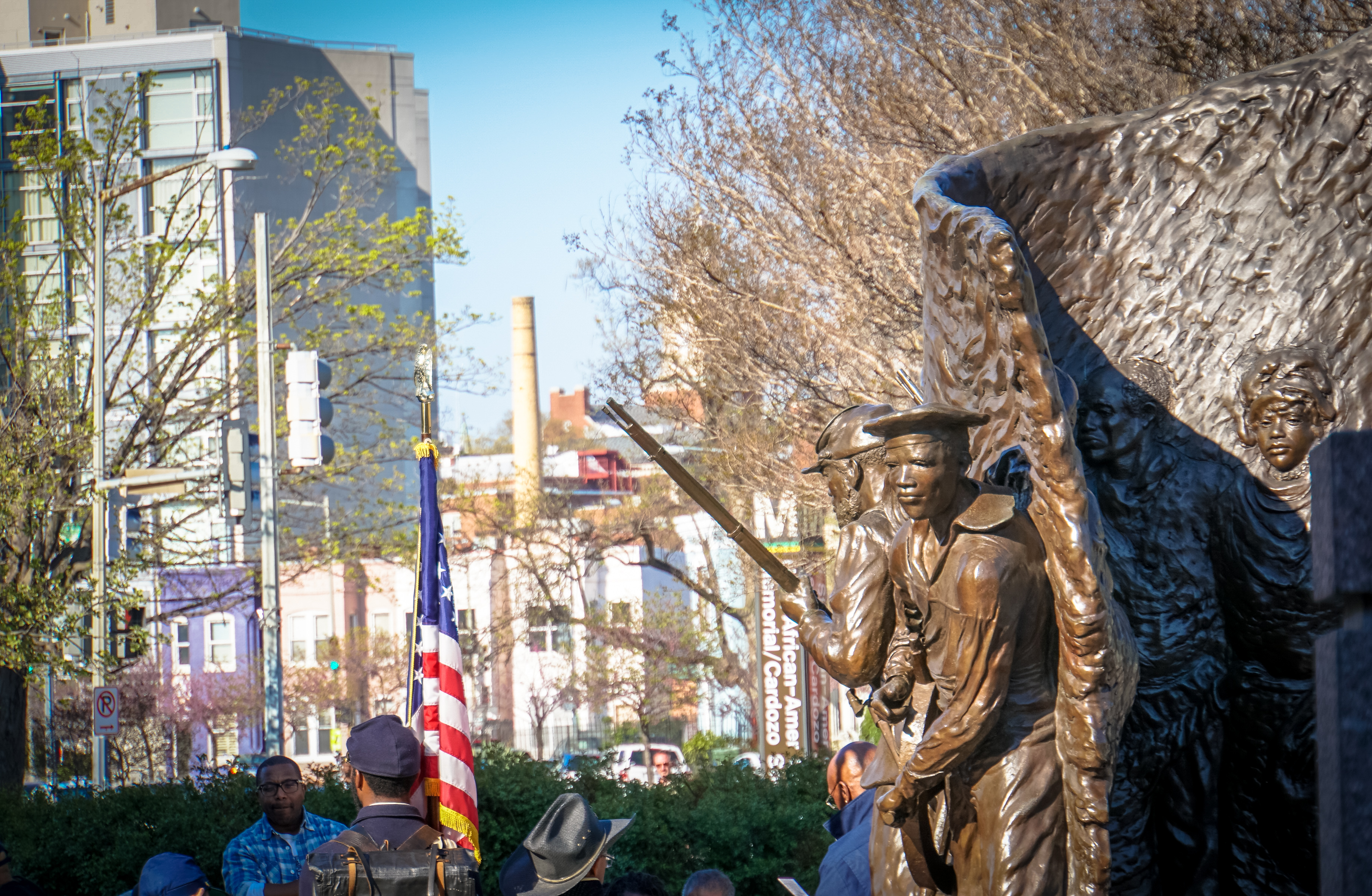
The African American Civil War Memorial, dedicated in 1991.

Following the economic downturn the area faced following the 1968 riots, the community and DC government launched numerous redevelopment efforts, such as the construction of the Reeves Center in 1986, the opening of the U Street station in 1991, and the 1998 Department of Housing and Urban Development grants funding "Remembering U Street" signage marking 15 historic properties and as façade improvements to 150 dilapidated storefronts on U and 14th streets

In the 1990s, revitalization of Adams Morgan and later Logan Circle began. More than 2,000 luxury condominiums and apartments were constructed between 1997 and 2007. As the area improved and became more attractive Washingtonians of all races and ethnicities, and of higher incomes and wealth, to live there, the ethnic mix of the neighborhood changed dramatically: in 2000 it was roughly 20% white and 60% black; while by 2010 that had reversed and the it was roughly 60% white and 20% black.

=== 21st century ===
Redevelopment continued further into the 2000s and 2010s, along with rising concerns about gentrification.

Since 2013 numerous large mixed use residential buildings with retail on the ground floor have been built into the corridor. This represents a significant population increase versus the population of 4,572 registered in the 2010 census.

In 2011, U Street NW was designated a Great Street among Great Places in America by the American Planning Association. It is said to have been selected for in recognition of the street return to its grandeur after several decades of difficulties. Once again, the street hosts the arts, food, and businesses. The community works to embrace its historical significance for the African American community of Washington, D.C. during segregation.

On January 4, 2021, the book "Black Broadway" by DC author and journalist Briana A. Thomas was published by The History Press. Thomas narrates U Street's rich and unique history, from the early triumph of emancipation to the days of civil rights pioneer Mary Church Terrell and music giant Duke Ellington, through the recent struggles of gentrification.

== Geography ==
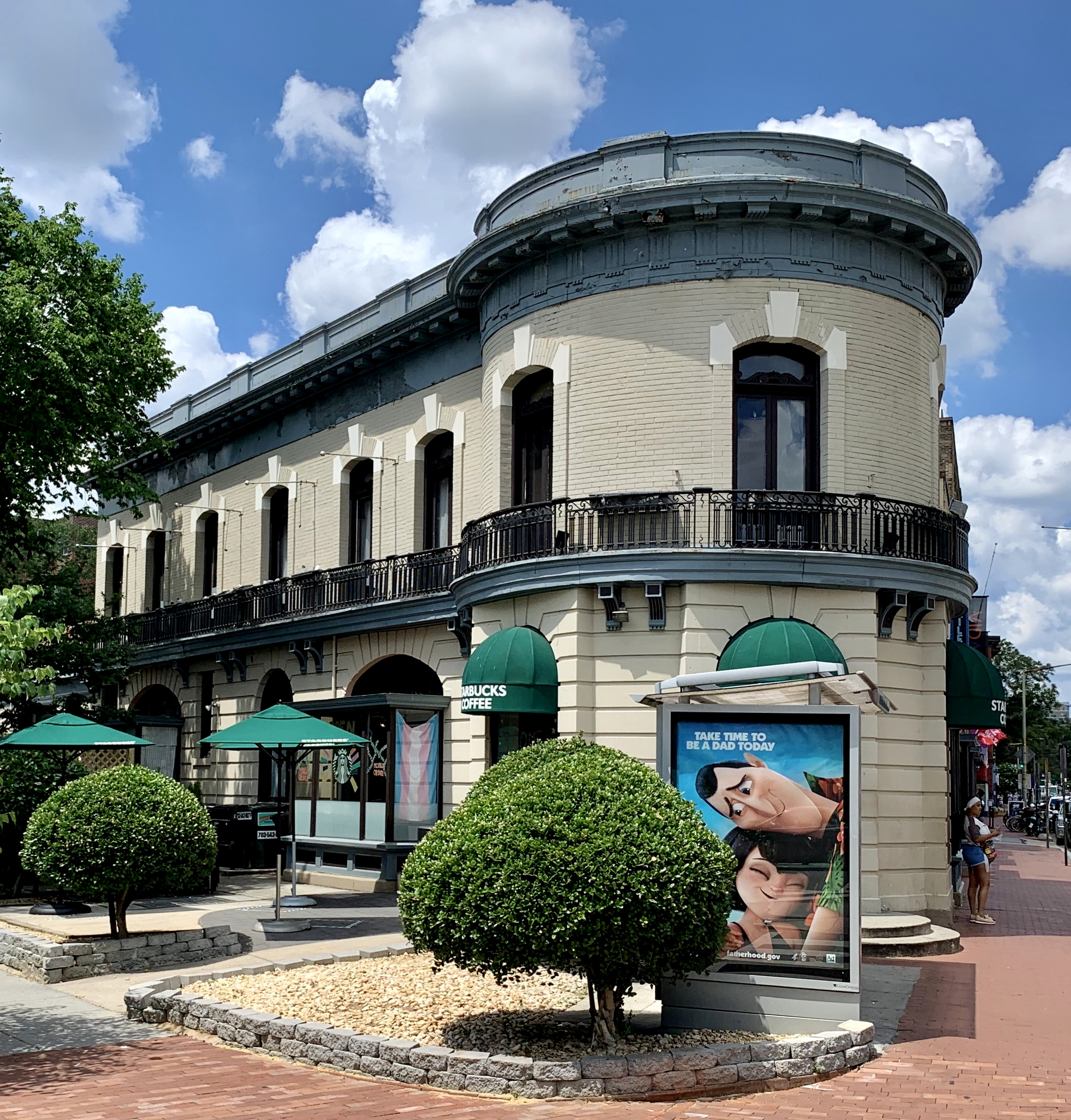
Historic architecture U St & 16th St.

The U Street Corridor is bounded by:

- on the north, Florida Ave. NW, towards the Meridian Hill and Columbia Heights neighborhoods
- on the south, S St. NW, towards the Logan Circle and Shaw neighborhoods
- on the east, 9th St. NW, towards the LeDroit Park, Howard University and Shaw neighborhoods
- on the west, 15th St. NW, towards the Adams Morgan and Dupont Circle neighborhoods and the Strivers' Section and Sixteenth Street historic districts

In addition to U Street itself, the intersecting 14th Street is a major retail, dining, and entertainment corridor.

=== Name ===
The area is often referred to as the U Street Corridor, and has been known by other names:

- Part of Shaw: The 1966 Shaw School Urban Renewal Area plan covered the neighborhood now commonly known as Shaw, but also the U Street Corridor, Logan Circle, that for decades were also considered part of Shaw.
- Cardozo: in the 1990s the U Street Corridor was often referred to as Cardozo/Shaw, a name that the DC planning department still uses. Google Maps labels the neighborhood Cardozo. In both cases this is defined as a neighborhood separate from the Shaw neighborhood proper. The Cardozo Education Campus is located adjacent to the U Street Corridor but is actually in Columbia Heights neighborhood.

== Demographics ==
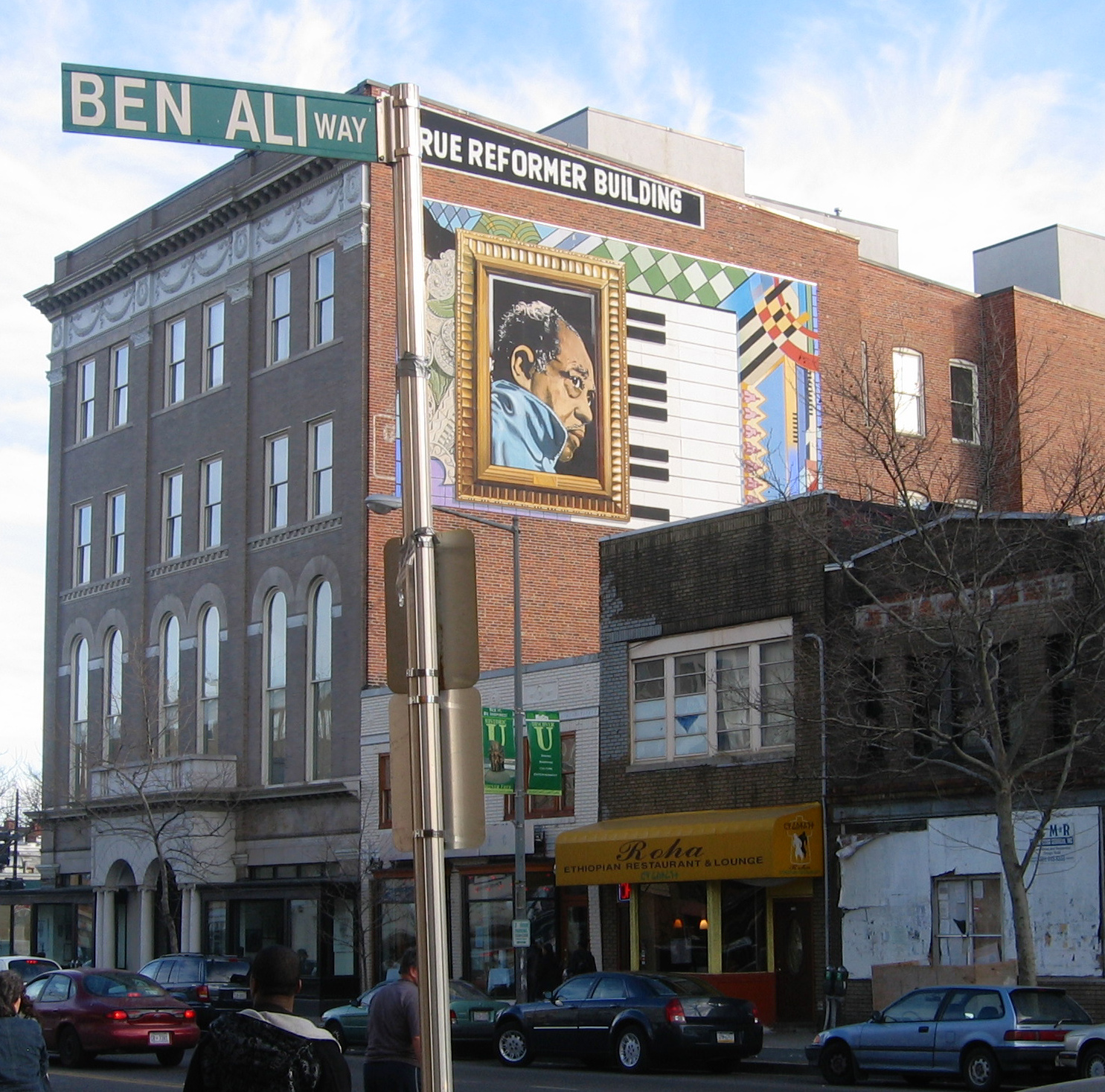
The True Reformer Building

Figures are for Census tract 44 through 2017, which was split into tracts 44.01 (north of U Street) and 44.02 (south of U street) as of the 2020 census.

Demographic	2020 census	2010 census	2000 census	1990 census	1980 census
Total pop.	6,185	4,572	2,450	2,951	3,598
Children (under 18)		6.8%		27%	
Seniors (65+)		4.8%		8.6%	
Citizen (of over 18 pop.)					
NH White	63.3%	60.8%	22%	8.7%	
NH Black	13.4%	21.5%	58%	77%	
Asian & Pacific Islander		6.8%	1.7%	1.6%	
Asian	8.3% (NH)				
Pacific Islander & Native Hawaiian	0.05% (NH)				
Some other race	0.53% (NH)				
Two or more races	5.2% (NH)	2.7%			
Hispanic	9.2%	9.1%	17%	12%	

NH = non-Hispanic, NHPI = does not include Native Hawaiians and Pacific Islanders

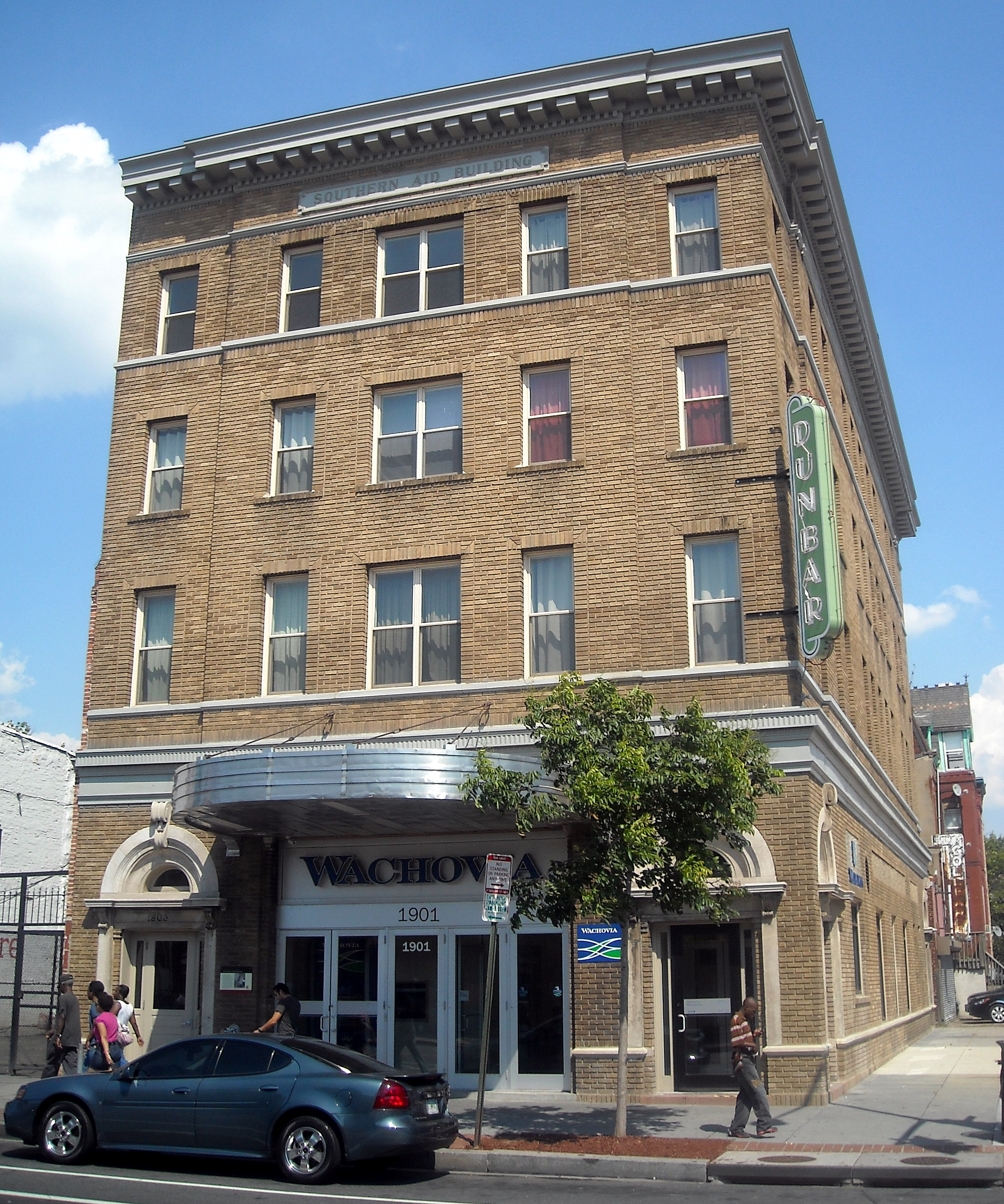
The Southern Aid Society–Dunbar Theater Building, built in 1921.

Census tract 44 was bounded by 14th, S, and 7th streets and Florida Av. NW, thus including the entire U Street Corridor plus four blocks east of 9th St. NW. As of 2020, it was divided into tracts 44.01 and 44.02 along U Street. This area counted a population of 5,385 in the more than double the 1990 population. The official census count was 4,572 in 2010, an 87% increase from only 2,450 in 2000, thus reversing the trend of a decreasing population from 2,951 in 1990 and 3,598 in 1980.

The racial change in the tract's population has been dramatic; non-Hispanic Black residents who were once the dominant group in the area, were only 13% of the population in 2020, down from 22% in 2010, and sharply down from 58% in 2000 and 77% in 1990; corresponding to an increase in whites and Asians: the white non-Hispanic population was 63% in 2020, 61% in 2010, 22% in 2000, 8.7% in 1990. The Asian/Pacific Islander population was 8.3%, a continued increase from 6.8% in 2010, and much higher than 1.7% in 2000 and 1.6% in 1990. The Hispanic population was 9.2% in 2020, relatively stable vs. 9.1% in 2010, but down from 17% in 2000 and 12% in 1990.

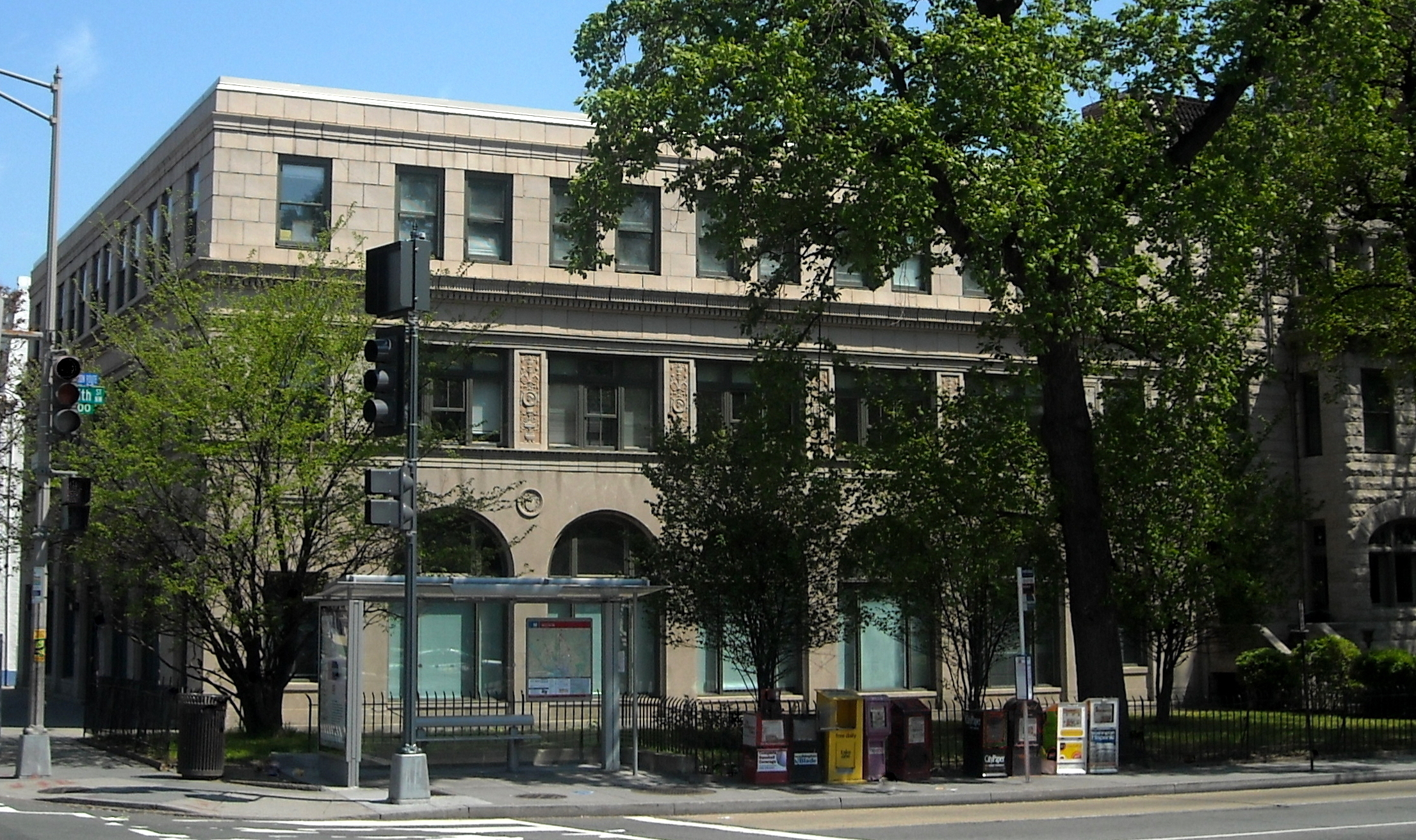
Community Change headquarters

The 2017 American Community Survey showed 6.8% of the area's residents were children in 2010, sharply down from 27% in 1990. Seniors also showed a decline at 4.8% in 2010, down from 8.6% in 1990. The foreign-born population was 18% in 2011–15, up from only 2.3% in 1980.

The per capita income in 2017 was est. $110,175 ±$10,961, more than double the average in D.C. ($50,832 ±$645); the Median household income was est. $166,071, more than$166,071, more than double the D.C. average of $77,649.

== Landmarks ==
- Greater U Street Historic District
- U.S. National Register of Historic Places
- U.S. Historic district
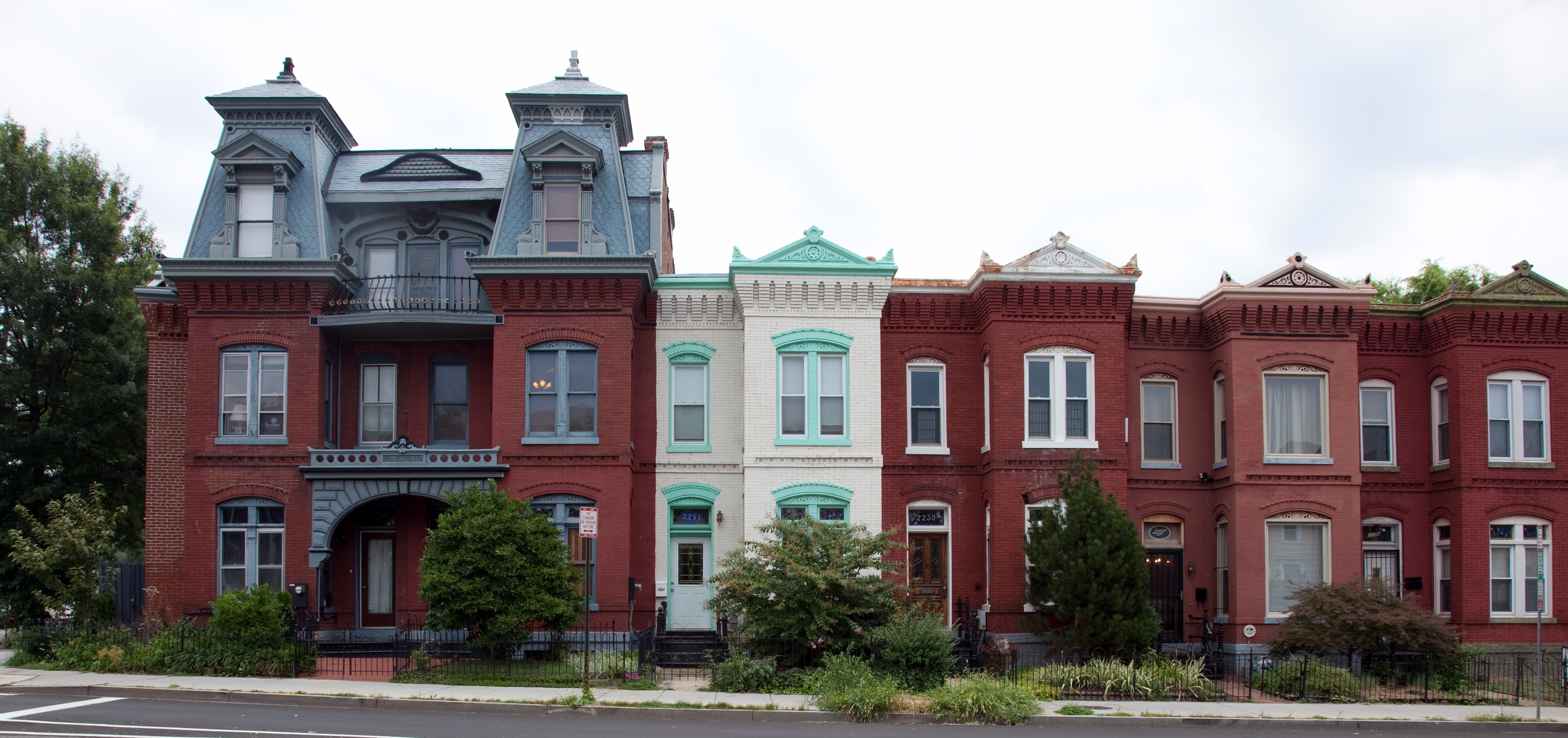
- Location: Boundary map
- Architectural style: Various (approximately 1580 contributing properties)
- NRHP reference No.: 98001557
- Added to NRHP: December 31, 1998

The neighborhood's landmark buildings are nearly all the works of prominent early 20th century African American architects, including:

- Ben's Chili Bowl, housed in the former Minnehaha nickelodeon (P. A. Hurlehaus, 1909)
- True Reformer Building by John A. Lankford, built in 1902
- Industrial Savings Bank by Isaiah T. Hatton, 1917
- Prince Hall Masonic Temple by Albert Cassell, 1922
- Thurgood Marshall Center - Twelfth Street YMCA by William Sidney Pittman, 1912
- The Whitelaw Hotel, by Isaiah T. Hatton, 1919

Other landmarks include:

- Lincoln Theatre, opened in 1922.
- Duke Ellington's former residences at 1805 and 1816 13th Street NW
- Mary Ann Shadd Cary House

== Culture ==
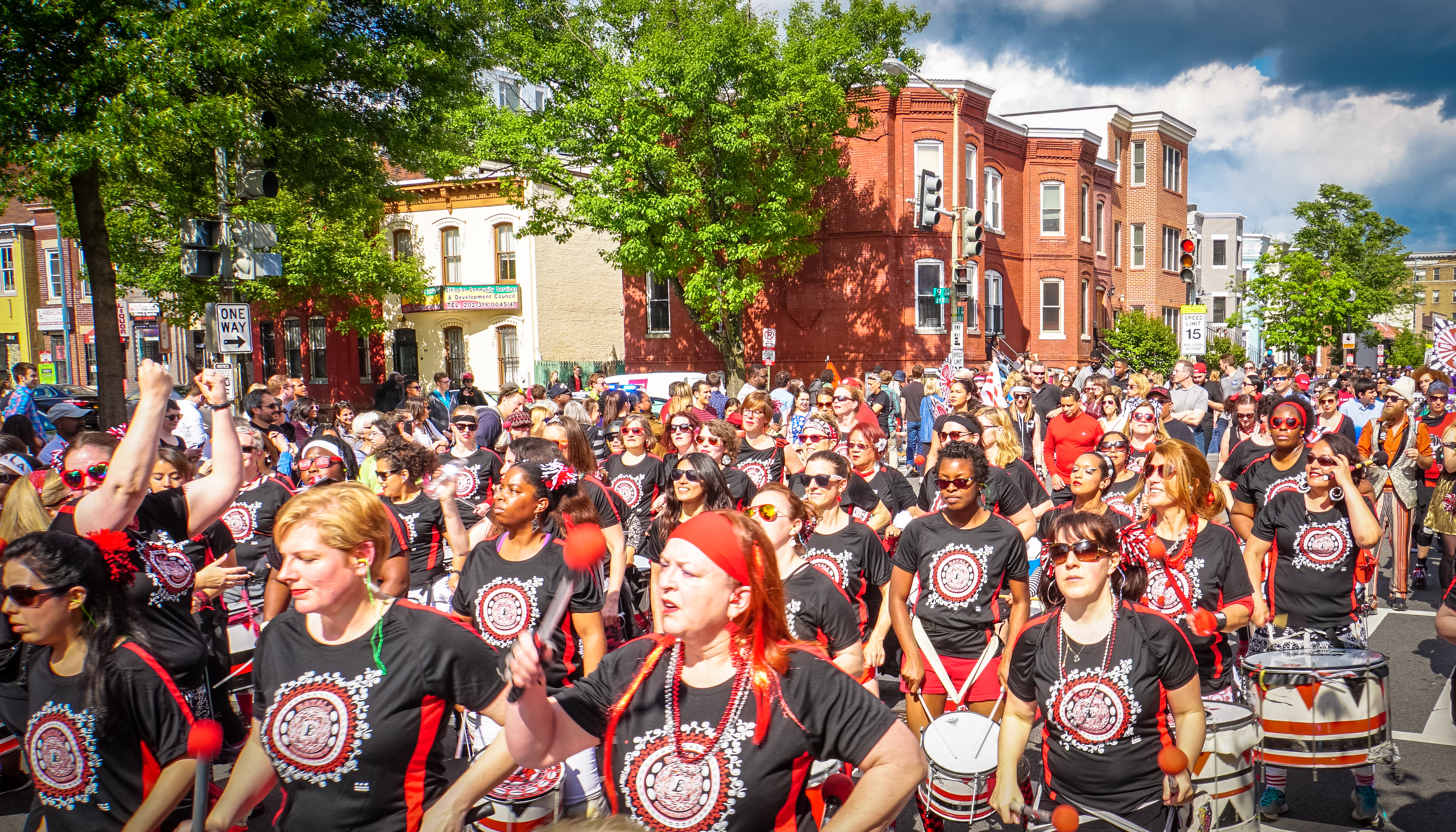
The Funk Parade is held annually on U Street, since 2013.

U Street has long been a center of Washington's music scene, with the Lincoln Theatre (1922), Howard Theatre, Bohemian Caverns (1926), and other clubs like on 9th Street at Harrington's, and Chez Maurice Restaurants and historic jazz venues. The 9:30 Club, the Black Cat, DC9, The Atlantis, U Street Music Hall, and the Velvet Lounge musical venues are located on the corridor.

U Street also hosts the annual Funk Parade, a festival and celebration of funk music, community arts, and creativity. Public art, street art or graffiti and murals, such as The Afro-Colombian Mural: Currulao y Desplazamiento, can be found on almost every corner along U Street.

== Transportation ==
The Corridor is served by the U Street station of the Washington Metro (subway), with service on the Green Line. WMATA buses run along both U and 14th streets. Capital Bikeshare and various scooter-sharing systems have stations/vehicles in the area.

== See also ==
- National Register of Historic Places listings in Northwest Quadrant, Washington, D.C.
