= Howard Theatre =

Music venue and theatre in Washington, D.C.

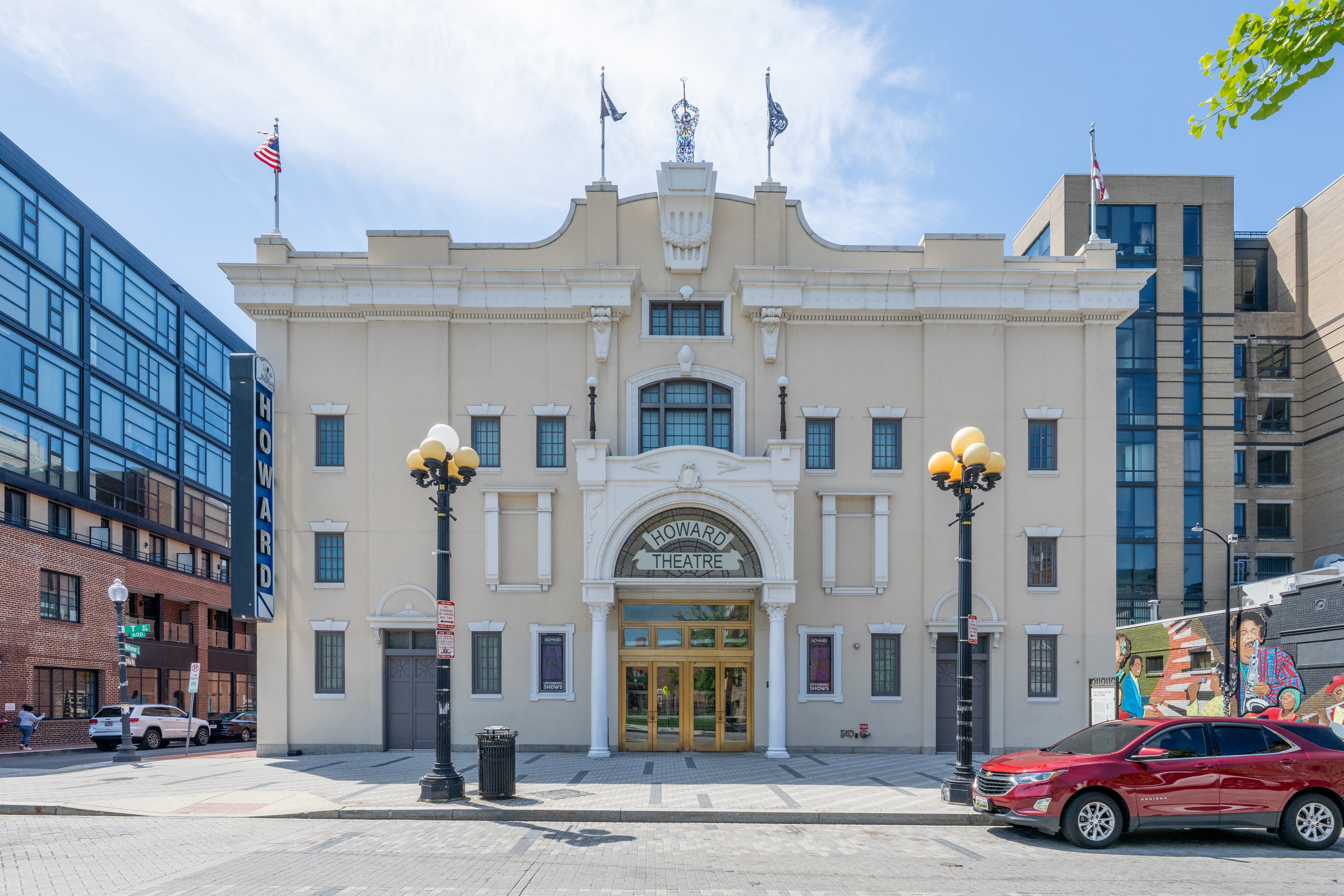
- (2026)
- Interactive map of Howard Theatre
- Address: 620 T St. NW; Washington, D.C. 20001-5117
- Location: Shaw
- Coordinates: 38.9152388°N 77.0237138°W
- Owner: Council of the District of Columbia
- Operator: Blue Note Entertainment Group
- Capacity: 700 (Reserved); 1,200 (General Admission)

Construction
- Opened: August 22, 1910
- Renovated: 1941, 1972, 2012
- Architect: J. Edward Storck

Website
- Venue Website
- Building details

General information
- Opened: April 9, 2012
- Renovation cost: $30 million

Renovating team
- Renovating firm: Martinez & Johnson Architecture, Marshall Moya Design
- Structural engineer: Lundy & Franke Engineering
- Services engineer: Metropolitan Engineering
- Civil engineer: Wiles Mensch Engineering
- Main contractor: Whiting-Turner
- Awards: DC Award for Excellence in Historic Resources (2012)
- Howard Theatre
- U.S. National Register of Historic Places
- U.S. Historic district – Contributing property
- Architectural style: Beaux-Arts
- Part of: Greater U Street Historic District
- NRHP reference No.: 74002162
- Added to NRHP: February 15, 1974

The Howard Theatre is a historic theater, located at 620 T Street, Northwest, Washington, D.C., that has been a pillar of the community since its opening in 1910. This historic venue, added to the National Register of Historic Places in 1974, showcases a variety of events, including live music, comedy, weddings, private events, and more.

In its heyday, the theater was known for catering to an African-American clientele, and had played host to many of the great Black musical artists of the early and mid-twentieth century. The Howard Theatre was billed as the "Theater of the People", and supported two theatrical organizations, the Lafayette Players and the Howard University Players. In September 2010 extensive renovations were started to restore the theater to its former glory. The theater reopened on April 9, 2012 to headline acts including Wanda Sykes, Blue Öyster Cult, and Chaka Khan, all of whom appeared in the first month after its reopening.

== Early history ==
Constructed in 1910, the theater was founded and owned by the National Amusement Company, a white-owned group. When built, it had a capacity of more than 1,200. Designed by J. Edward Storck, the theater featured orchestra and balcony seats and eight proscenium boxes, with a lavishly decorated interior. No less extravagant was the exterior, which combined elements of the Beaux-Arts, Italian Renaissance, and neoclassical styles. The whole was surmounted by a larger than life statue of Apollo playing his lyre.

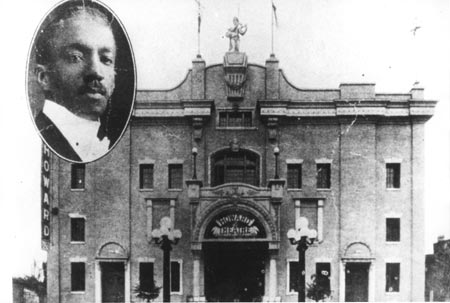
Howard Theatre at 620 T Street NW, with inset of manager, Andrew J. Thomas (c. 1910-1919).

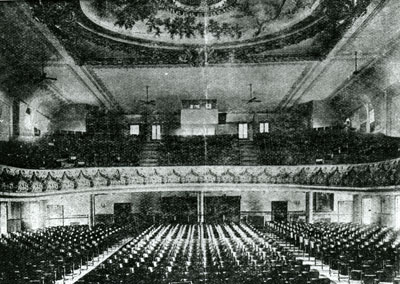
Interior of the Howard Theatre at 620 T Street NW, c. 1915.

Andrew Thomas served as the theater's manager during its early years. Beginning in 1922 it was leased and run by actor, producer, and entrepreneur Sherman Dudley. It was taken over in 1926 by Abe Lichtman, the white owner of a chain of movie theaters that were frequented by Blacks. With the onset of the Great Depression, the building became a church for a time under the direction of Elder Michaux. In 1931, as part of the venue's return to its original purpose, Duke Ellington appeared with his band at "the Howard", helping also to cement the theater's reputation as an entertainment hotspot. This rebirth was helped along by Shep Allen, the building's new manager. In the 1930s Allen introduced an amateur contest that was used as a springboard to stardom by Billy Eckstine and Ella Fitzgerald.

The Howard Theatre lost its original ornate facade in 1941 when it was redone in the then-fashionable Streamline style. Franklin Delano Roosevelt and his wife Eleanor would attend balls at the theater during World War II. These balls featured performers like Danny Kaye, Abbott and Costello and Cesar Romero, among others. Also in the 1940s, Pearl Bailey made her debut at the Howard Theatre.

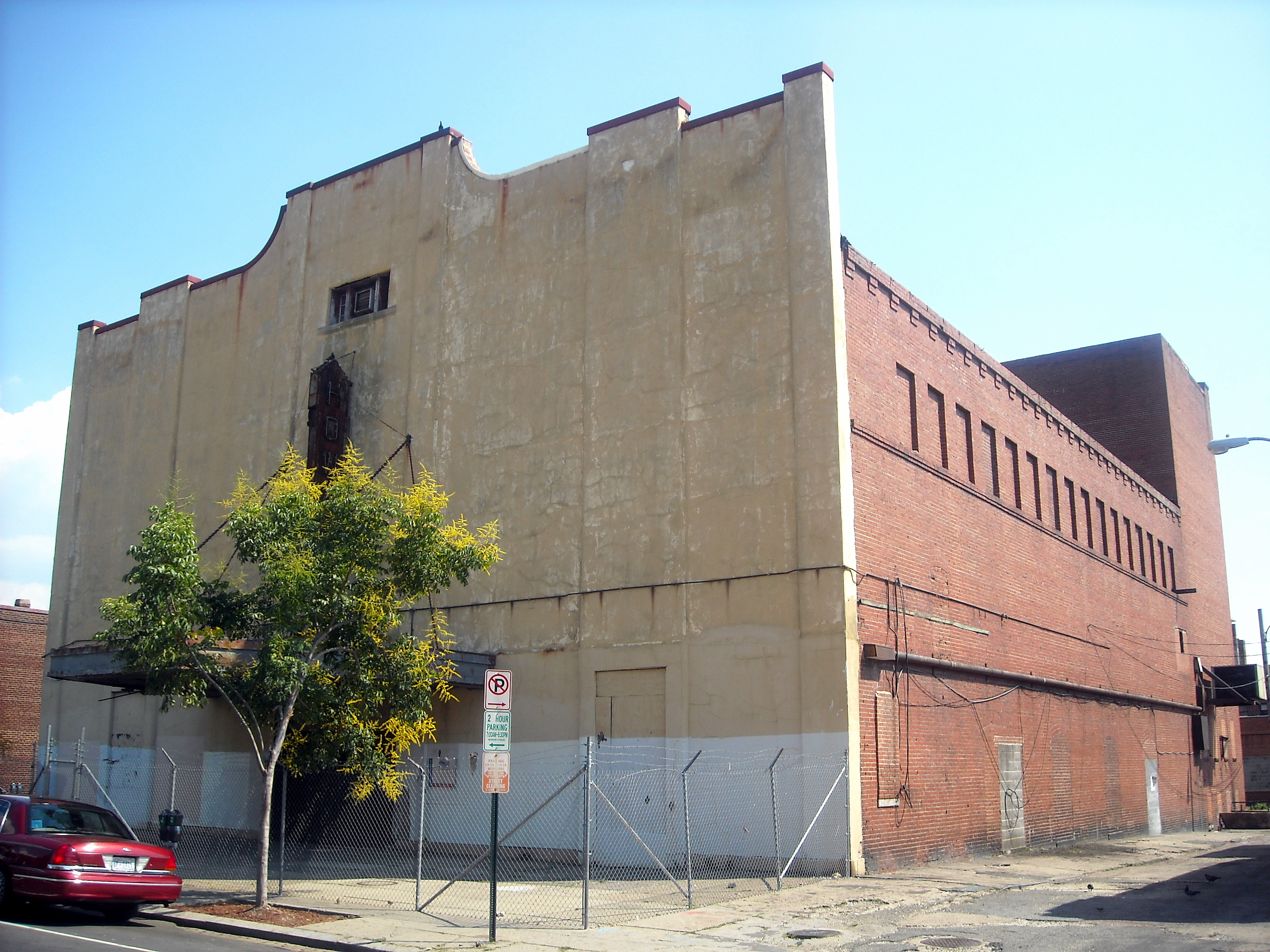
The theatre in disrepair in 2008, before the renovation and reopening.

The Howard Theatre turned into a house for rock 'n' roll and rhythm and blues during the 1950s and 1960s, when many important acts from both genres played there. Among the acts to grace the stage were Sarah Vaughan, Dinah Washington, Sammy Davis Jr., James Brown, Lena Horne, Lionel Hampton, The Supremes, Stevie Wonder, and Dionne Warwick, Martha Reeves & The Vandellas, Marvin Gaye and Mary Wells

The 1968 riots, which followed the April 4 assassination of Martin Luther King Jr., caused the venue a great deal of harm. The riots, coupled with desegregation, contributed to the theater's difficulty in attracting patrons, and the theater closed in 1970. Three years later, in 1973, the Howard Theatre Foundation was organized to reopen the venue. It was this organization which succeeded, in 1974, in gaining the building historic landmark status. In April 1975, the New Howard Theatre Corporation presented an evening of entertainment to salute the reopening of the theater. Redd Foxx and Melba Moore were among the acts featured at the theater's reopening. Later in the decade, go-go bands played the venue, and Chuck Brown and the Soul Searchers also performed at the Howard Theatre in the 1970s and 1980s. In 1980, the theater closed again. At the time it was the oldest venue in the country that featured Black artists. Under Mayor Marion Barry the theatre was purchased by the District government for $100,000. In 2002, the DC Preservation League listed the Howard Theatre as one of its Most Endangered Places in the District.

== Reopening ==
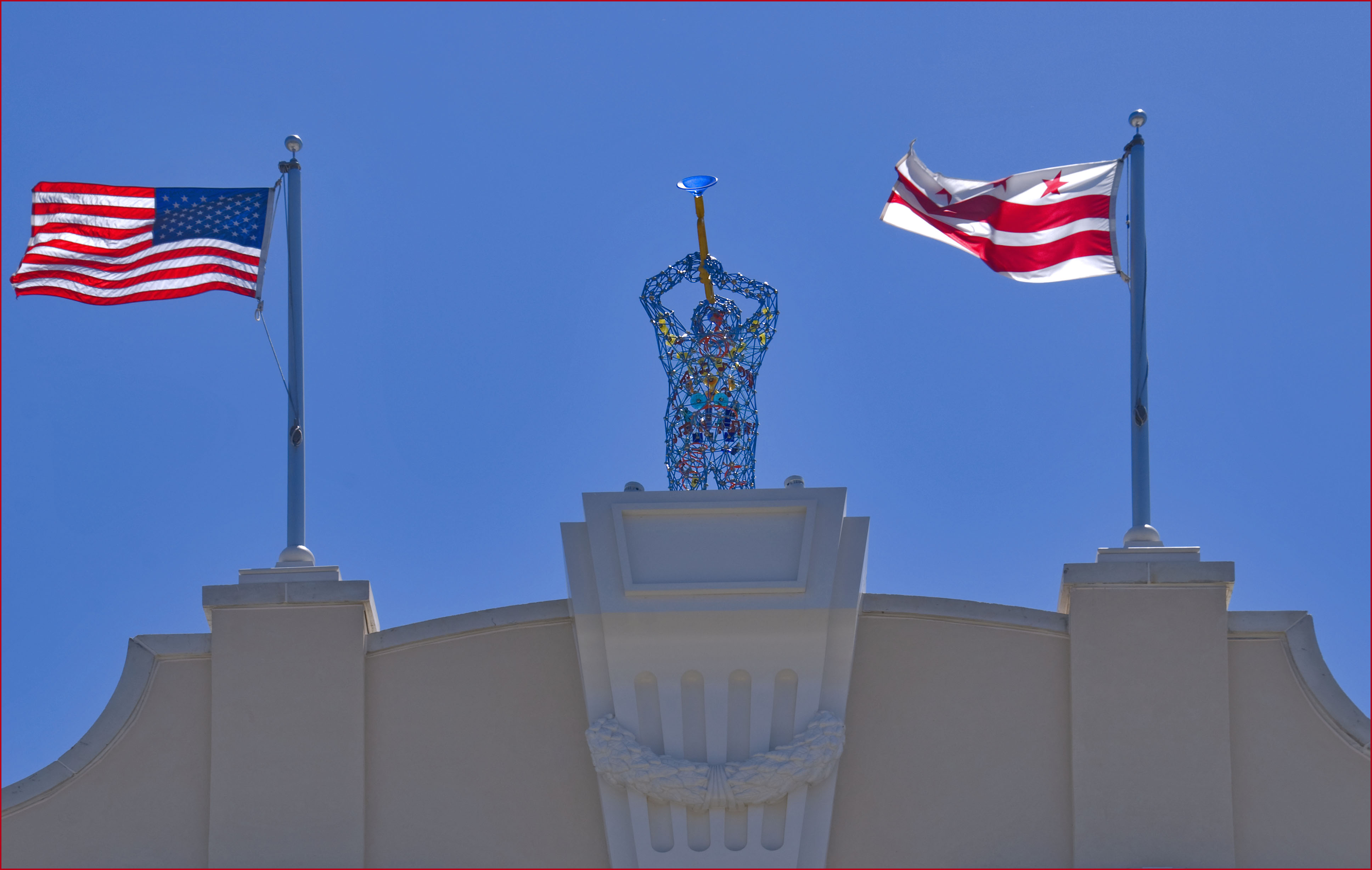
A close up of the "Jazz Man" statue atop the theatre's front façade.

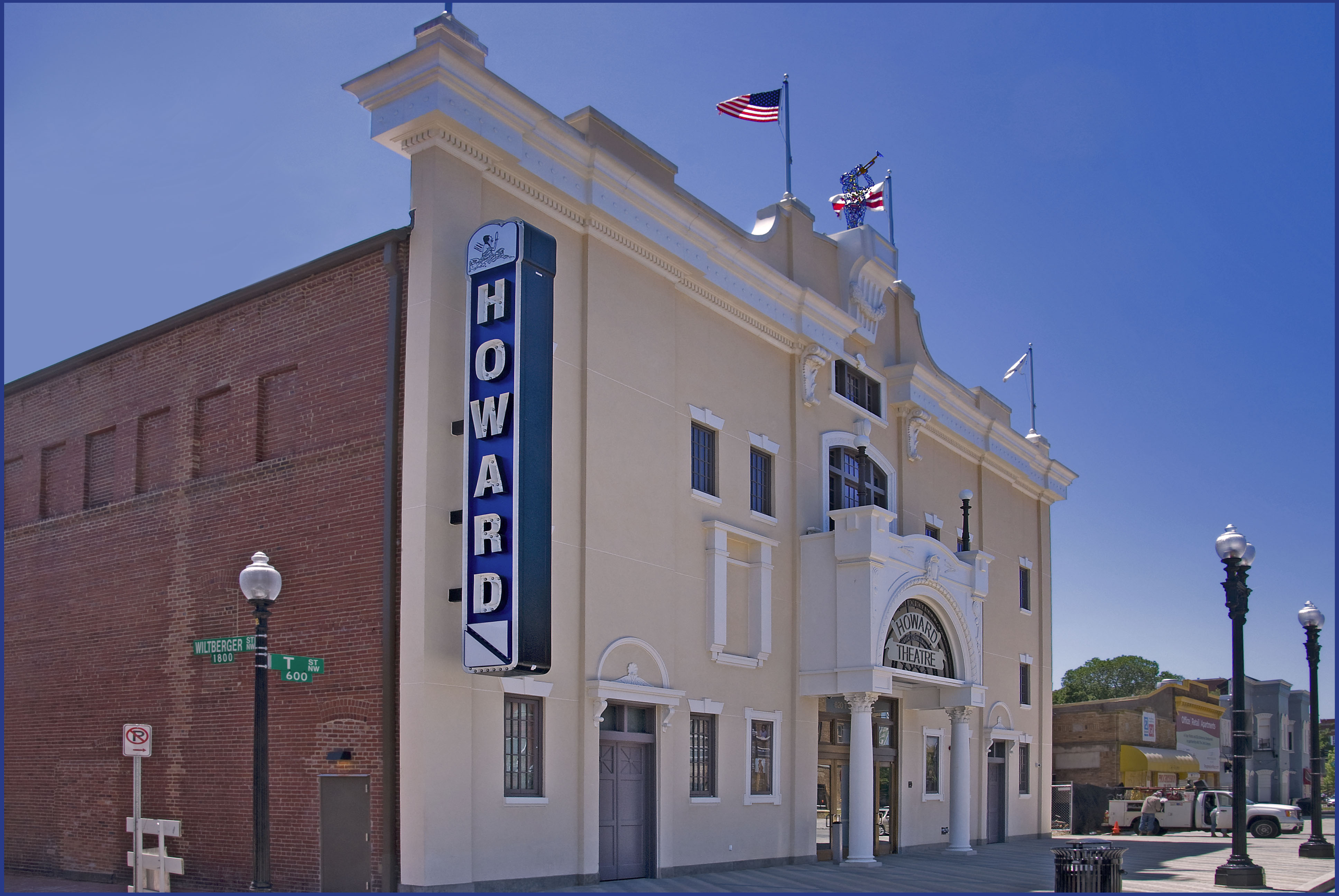
The renovated theatre in 2012.

In 2006, the Howard Theatre was returned to private ownership when Ellis Development was selected to renovate and restore the theatre. The District set aside $20 million in public funding for the renovation.

Ellis Development, led by Chip Ellis and his son, Malik Ellis, formed Howard Theatre Development Group LLC. Through Howard Theatre Development Group, Ellis Development received nearly $12 million in District funds to redevelop and reopen the theatre. To oversee management of the facility, Ellis Development created the nonprofit Howard Theatre Restoration Inc.

In September 2010, groundbreaking for extensive renovations of the theater was held. The project's goals were to restore the Howard Theatre to 600 seats, complementing developments at the adjacent Progression Place. Martinez + Johnson Architecture and Marshall Moya Design were responsible for the restoration, architecture, and design of the theater. The theater reopened for Community Day on April 9, 2012. The grand opening event was held on April 10.

=== Acts ===
Since its reopening, it has hosted a diverse lineup of well-known acts, including Vic Mensa, Anthony Hamilton, Raheem DeVaughn, Chrisette Michele, Tamia, Dianne Reeves, Gregory Porter, Esperanza Spalding, Pete Yorn, José James, The Roots, Slick Rick, Chaka Khan, Sizzla, Aaron Neville, Kendrick Lamar, Sheila E, Keke Wyatt, and Todrick Hall.
