= Joel Bergner =

American street artist

Joel Bergner (a.k.a. Joel Artista) is an American muralist, street artist, and educator who creates large-scale works of art with the participation of young people and communities around the world. Bergner is the co-founder and co-director of the non-profit organization Artolution, which organizes community-based public art initiatives with those who have experienced armed conflict, trauma and social marginalization. He has led such projects with incarcerated teenagers, Syrian refugees, youth from slum areas, the mentally and physically disabled, young people with substance abuse issues, orphans and street children.

== Art activism ==
Bergner has led multiple projects in Jordan with Syrian children in the Za’atari refugee camp and other communities in partnership with UNICEF, aptART, ACTED and Mercy Corps, in collaboration with local Syrian artists and educators.

For his 2016 tour of India, Bergner’s community projects addressed issues of gender equality and human trafficking. His work was featured at the Kala Ghoda Art Festival in Mumbai and he created a mural with local artists in West Bengal for the International Anti-Human Trafficking Conclave, organized by NGO Shakti Vahini, the Indian government and the US Consulate in Kolkata.

Through Artolution, he and co-director Max Frieder lead regular projects that bring together Israeli and Palestinian adolescents to create public murals together and begin a dialogue as a step toward reconciliation, work that is supported by the US Embassy and Consulate. As part of the same program, they facilitate projects with Palestinian youth in the West Bank and East Jerusalem.

== Art work ==
Working primarily in spray paint and acrylic paint, Bergner has created large public murals in many US cities and in Brazil, Jordan, India, Cuba, Kenya, Estonia, South Africa, Mexico, Norway, Israel and the Palestinian territories, Mozambique, Poland, Cape Verde, El Salvador, Germany, the UK, Sweden and Peru. These projects often feature collaborations with human rights and youth organizations as well as companies, government agencies and educational institutions, most notably the International Rescue Committee, the US Committee for Refugees and Immigrants, the Boys & Girls Club, UNICEF, Mercy Corps, Park Inn by Radisson Hotels, Street Child United, WITNESS, the US State Department, Meridian International Center and Amnesty International, who invited him to be a featured artist at their Human Rights Art Festival in 2010.

== Honors ==
In 2014, Joel Bergner was a featured artist with the global event Street Child World Cup in Rio de Janeiro, where he worked with former and current street children from around the world to create public art, followed by the Street Child Summit in London in 2015. In 2013 Joel Bergner organized and led the Kibera Walls for Peace Initiative in the Kibera slum of Nairobi, Kenya in collaboration with the Kibera Hamlets youth organization. The project, which was widely covered in the international media, involved peace-building workshops with local children and teenagers and the creation of a series of street paintings that promoted peace ahead of the 2013 presidential elections, all of which was documented for a film by Nairobi filmmaker Willie Owusu. The initiative included a collaboration with local graffiti artists for the "Peace Train," in which the artists and youth participants painted a 10-car passenger train with art aimed at easing ethnic tensions as the election approached.

Bergner’s art-based social projects have been published in The New York Times, The Washington Post, and in the books Street Art San Francisco: Mission Muralismo and Mural Art Volume 3. He has been featured on the international news networks Al Jazeera English, CNN, Voice of America, and BBC World News.

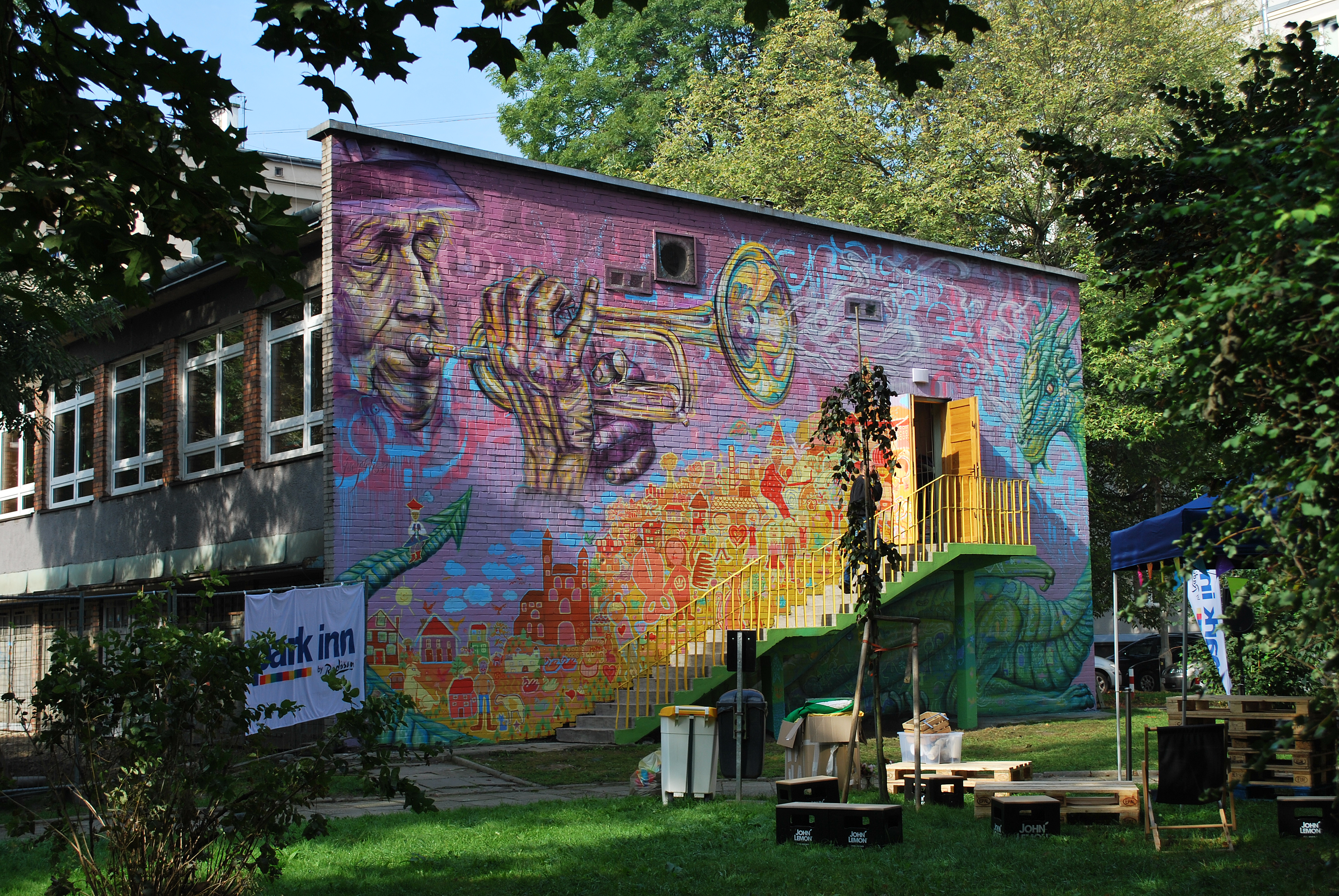
Jedrus center building, mural designed (2016) by Joel Bergner, 6a osiedle Centrum A, Nowa Huta, Krakow, Poland.
