= List of people from Tennessee =

State flag of Tennessee

Location of Tennessee in the United States

The following is a list of prominent people who were born in the U.S. state of Tennessee, live (or lived) in Tennessee, or for whom Tennessee is significant part of their identity:

== A ==
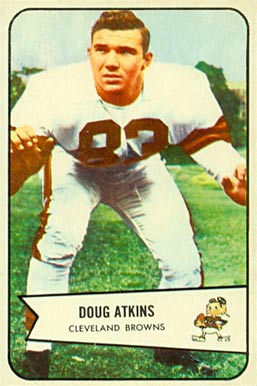
Doug Atkins

- Roy Acuff (1903–1992), musician; born in Maynardville
- Charlie Adams, drummer
- Calpernia Addams (born 1971), transgender actress; born in Nashville
- James Agee (1909–1955); Pulitzer Prize-winning novelist, screenwriter, poet, critic; born in Knoxville
- The Aldridge Sisters, singing duo on The Lawrence Welk Show (1977–1982)
- Jessi Alexander (born 1976), singer-songwriter; born in Jackson
- Lamar Alexander (born 1940), lawyer and U.S. senator; born in Maryville
- Mo Alexander (born 1970), comedian; born in Memphis
- Duane Allman (1946–1971), guitarist; born in Nashville
- Gregg Allman (1947–2017), singer-songwriter, musician; born in Nashville
- Jarrod Alonge (born 1993), comedian and musician; lives in Chattanooga
- Monroe Dunaway Anderson, banker, cotton trader; from Jackson
- William R. Anderson (1921–2007), naval officer, politician; born in Humphreys County
- Lona Andre (1915–1992), actress, golfer; born in Nashville
- Jessica Andrews (born 1983), singer
- Jill Andrews, singer-songwriter, musician, born in Johnson City
- Lil Hardin Armstrong, jazz musician, wife of Louis Armstrong; from Memphis
- Eddy Arnold (1918–2008), singer; born in Henderson
- Victor Ashe, Knoxville mayor, Ambassador to Poland; born in Knoxville
- Chet Atkins (1924–2001), guitarist and record producer; born in Luttrell
- Doug Atkins (1930–2015), Pro Football Hall of Fame defensive end primarily with Chicago Bears
- Rodney Atkins (born 1969), singer; born in Knoxville
- Estelle Axton (1918–2004), co-founder of Stax Records

== B ==
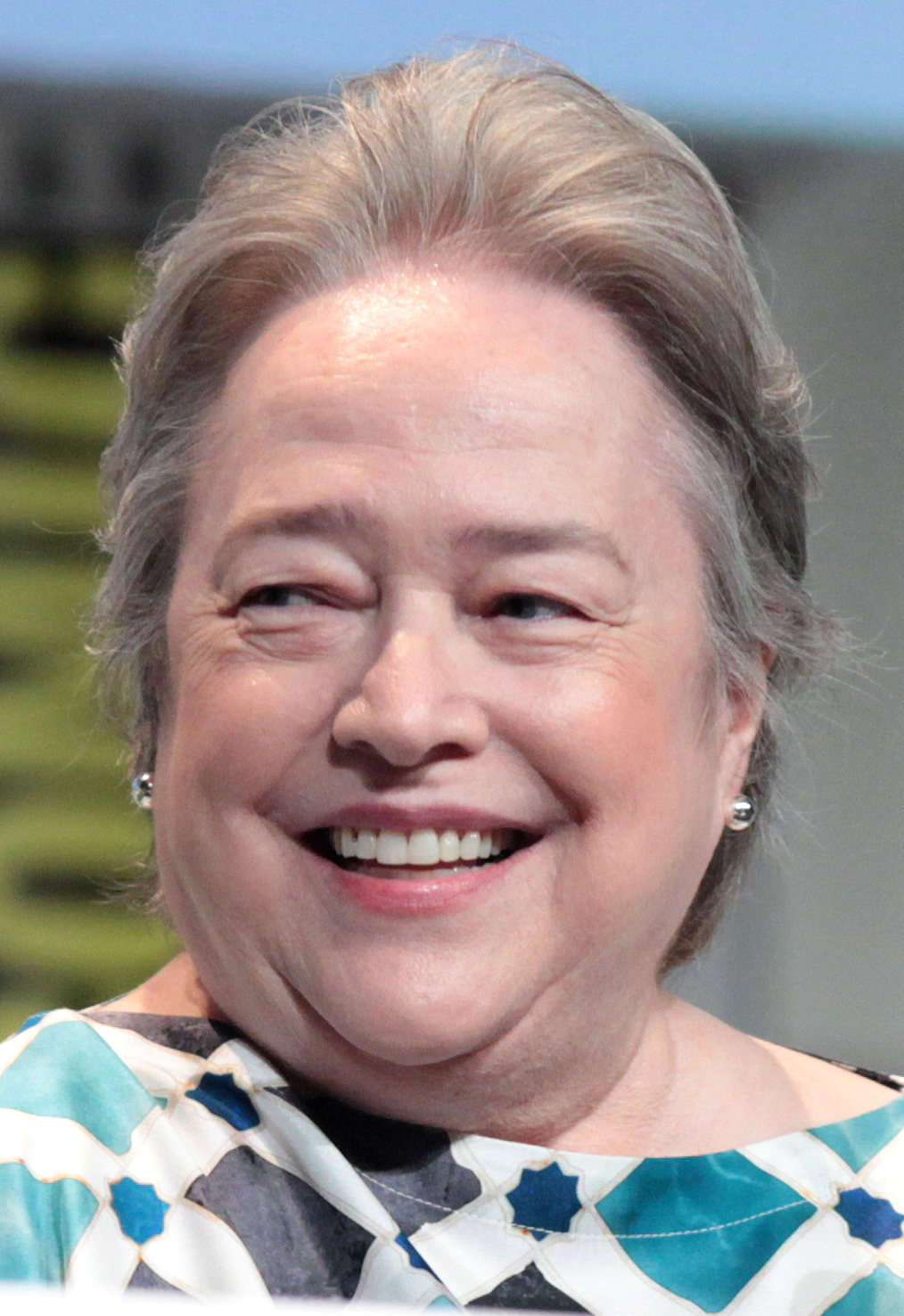
Kathy Bates

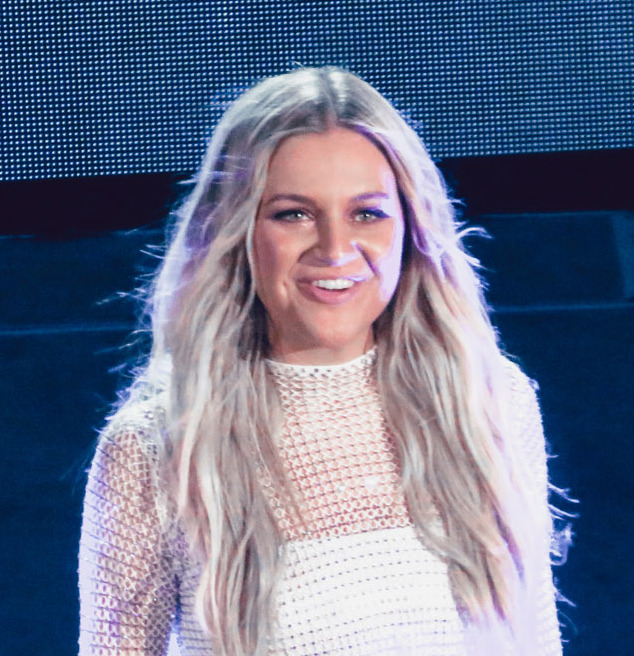
Kelsea Ballerini

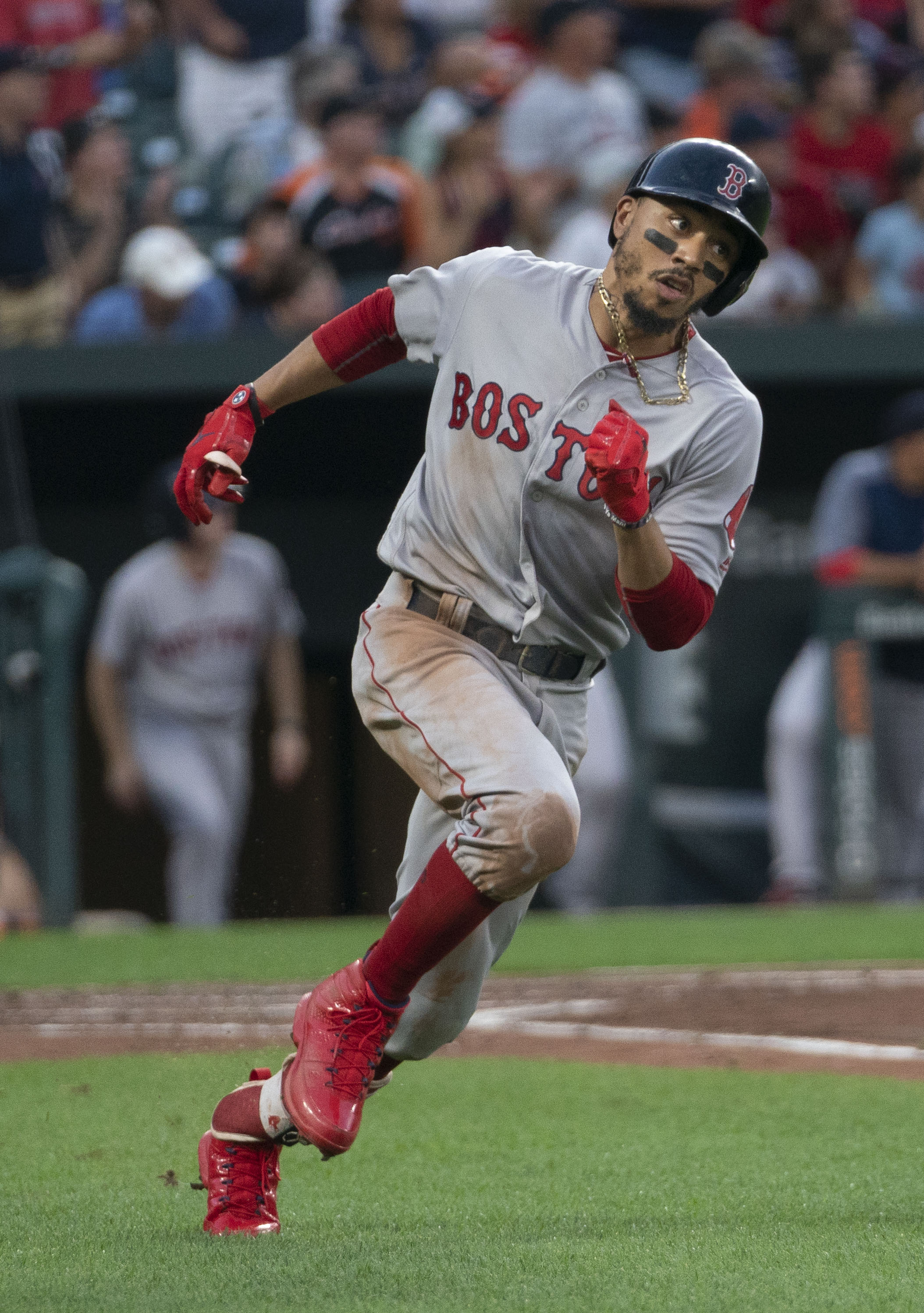
Mookie Betts

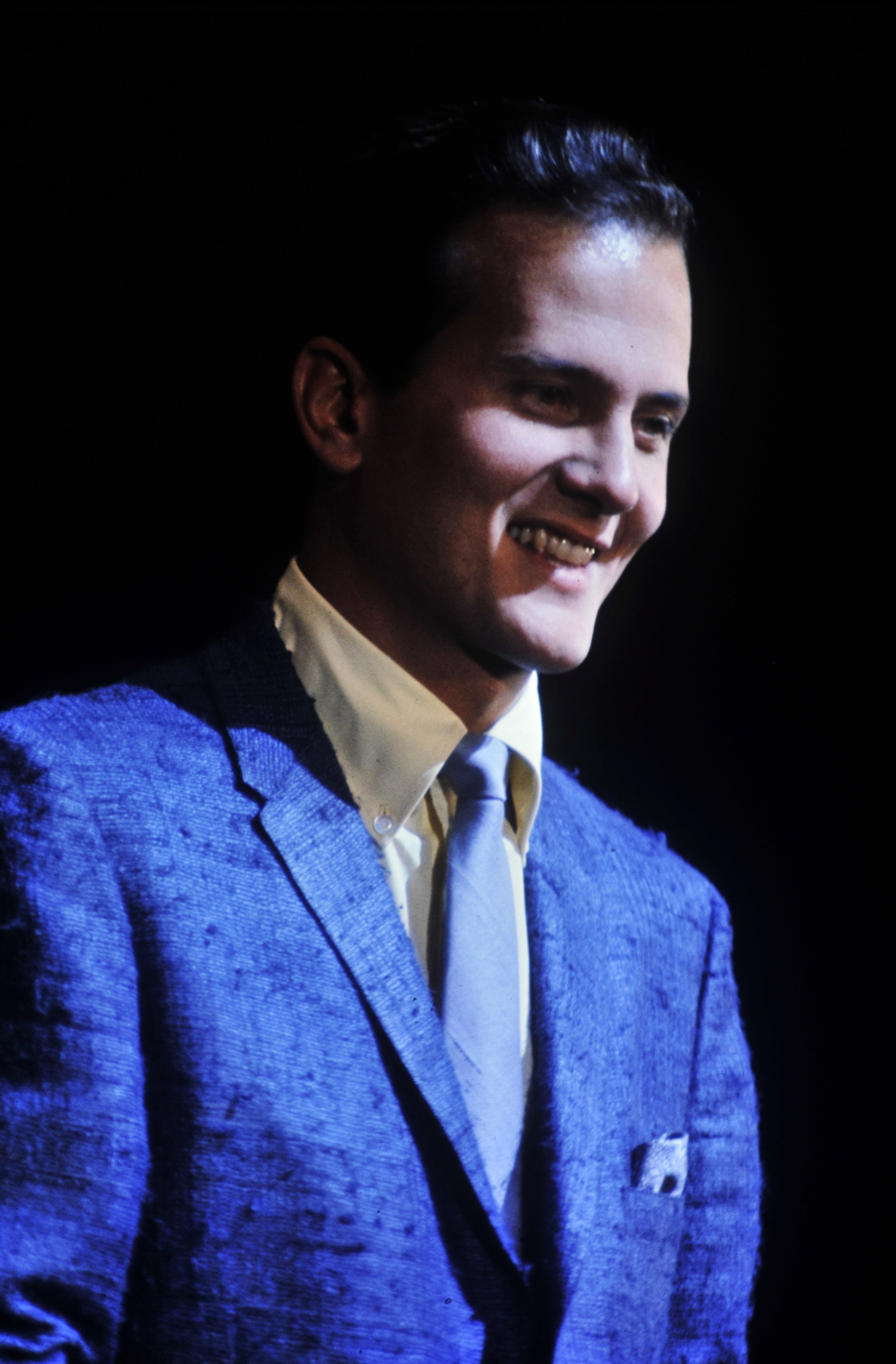
Pat Boone

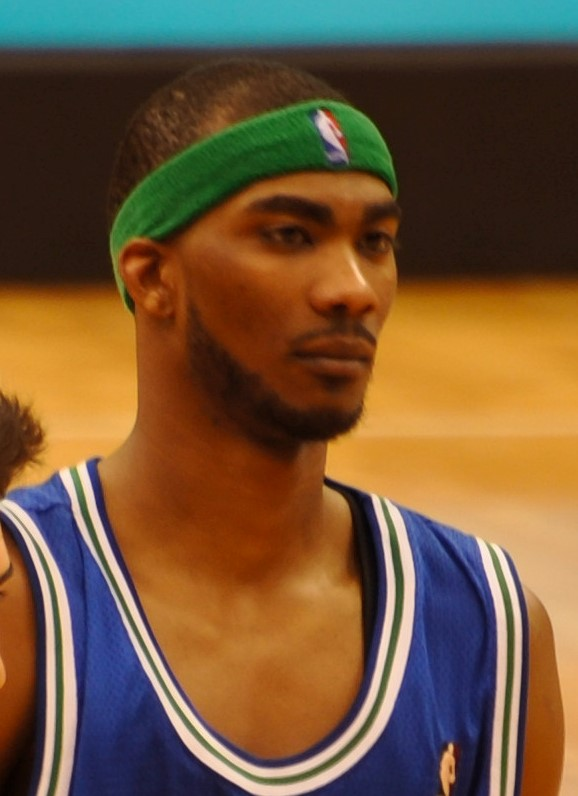
Corey Brewer

- Nathan L. Bachman (1878–1937), U.S. senator
- DeFord Bailey (1897–1982), musician, Grand Ole Opry performer; from Smith County
- Ed Bailey (1931–2007), baseball player
- H. E. Bailey (1898/1899–1976)
- Howard Baker (1925–2014), politician, U.S. senator and White House Chief of Staff; born in Huntsville
- Julien Baker (born 1995), singer-songwriter; born in Germantown, Tennessee
- Robert Baker (born 1979), actor; born in Memphis
- Kelsea Ballerini (born 1993), singer; born in Mascot, grew up in Knoxville
- Adrian Banks (born 1986), basketball player, 2011-12 top scorer in the Israel Basketball Premier League
- Ava Barber (born 1954), singer; born in Knoxville
- George Franklin Barber (1854–1915), architect; lived in Knoxville
- Ronnie Barrett (born 1954), firearms manufacturer; born in Murfreesboro
- Ross Bass (1918–1993), U.S. senator
- William M. Bass (born 1928), forensic anthropologist
- William B. Bate (1826–1905), governor and U.S. senator
- Daren Bates (born 1990), football player; born in Memphis
- Kathy Bates (born 1948), Academy Award-winning actress; born in Memphis
- Maddox Batson (born 2009), country singer/songwriter; born in Nashville
- Kate Batts (also known as The Bell Witch), mythic poltergeist
- Robin Beard (1939–2007), politician; born in Knoxville
- Casey Beathard, songwriter; from Spring Hill
- Bianca Belair (born 1989), WWE wrestler; born in Knoxville
- Bill Belichick (born 1952), head coach of New England Patriots; born in Nashville
- Brian Bell (born 1968), guitarist; from Knoxville
- John Bell (1796–1869), politician, Secretary of War under William Henry Harrison; from Mill Creek
- William Bell (born 1939), singer
- Jeff Bennett (born 1980), baseball pitcher; born in Donelson
- Aaron Benward (born 1973), singer
- Polly Bergen (1930–2014), actress, singer, entrepreneur; born in Knoxville
- George L. Berry (1882–1948), U.S. senator
- Mookie Betts (born 1992), baseball player; born in Brentwood
- Greg Bird (born 1992), baseball player; born in Memphis
- Tarik Black, basketball player
- Joe Blanton (born 1980), baseball pitcher; born in Nashville
- Jerry Blevins (born 1983), baseball pitcher; born in Johnson City
- William Blount (1749–1800), statesman, governor and senator
- Willie Blount (1768–1835), early governor of Tennessee
- Julian Bond (1940–2015), activist, politician; born in Nashville
- Alexander Bonnyman Jr. (1910–1943), decorated U.S. Marine; raised in Knoxville
- Arna W. Bontemps (1902–1973), poet and novelist
- Maci Bookout, reality TV personality
- Pat Boone (born 1934), singer and actor; raised in Nashville
- Rachel Boston (born 1982), actress; born in Chattanooga
- Charles Boyce, syndicated cartoonist
- Craig Wayne Boyd (born 1978), singer, winner of NBC's The Voice season 7; resides in Nashville
- Richard Henry Boyd (1843–1922), founder, National Baptist Publishing Board
- Jarrett Boykin (born 1989), football player; born in Chattanooga
- Virginia Frazer Boyle (1863–1938), author, poet
- St. Elmo Brady, chemist; attended Fisk University
- Rod Brasfield (1910–1958), comedian
- Corey Brewer (born 1986), basketball player; from Portland
- Bill Brock (1930–2021), U.S. senator and U.S. Secretary of Labor
- Cary Brothers, indie rock singer-songwriter; from Nashville
- Rex Brothers (born 1987), baseball player; born in Murfreesboro
- Clarence Brown (1890–1987), film director; attended school in Knoxville
- John C. Brown (1827–1889), governor
- Marlon Brown (born 1991), football player; born in Memphis
- Neill S. Brown (1810–1896), governor
- Gordon Browning (1889–1976), governor
- Jonathan Browning (1805–1879), maker of firearms; born in Sumner County
- William Gannaway Brownlow (1805–1877), editor and governor
- James M. Buchanan, economist, Nobel laureate
- John P. Buchanan (1847–1930), governor
- Young Buck (born 1981), rapper
- Josh Bullocks (born 1983), football player; born in Chattanooga
- Frances Hodgson Burnett (1849–1924), English-born author; settled near Knoxville
- Morgan Burnett, football player; born in Memphis
- Kenneth C. Burns (1920–1989), musician, "Jethro" of Homer and Jethro
- Charles Burson (born 1944), chief of staff for Al Gore; grew up in Shelby County
- Kristian Bush (born 1970), singer; born in Knoxville
- Jake Butcher (1936–2017), banker and politician
- Carl Butler (1927–1992), singer-songwriter; born in Knoxville
- Derrick Byars (born 1984), basketball player; born in Memphis
- Bill Byrge (1932–2025), actor, comedian; born in Nashville
- Joseph W. Byrns (1869–1936), 14-term congressman; born in Cedar Hill

== C ==
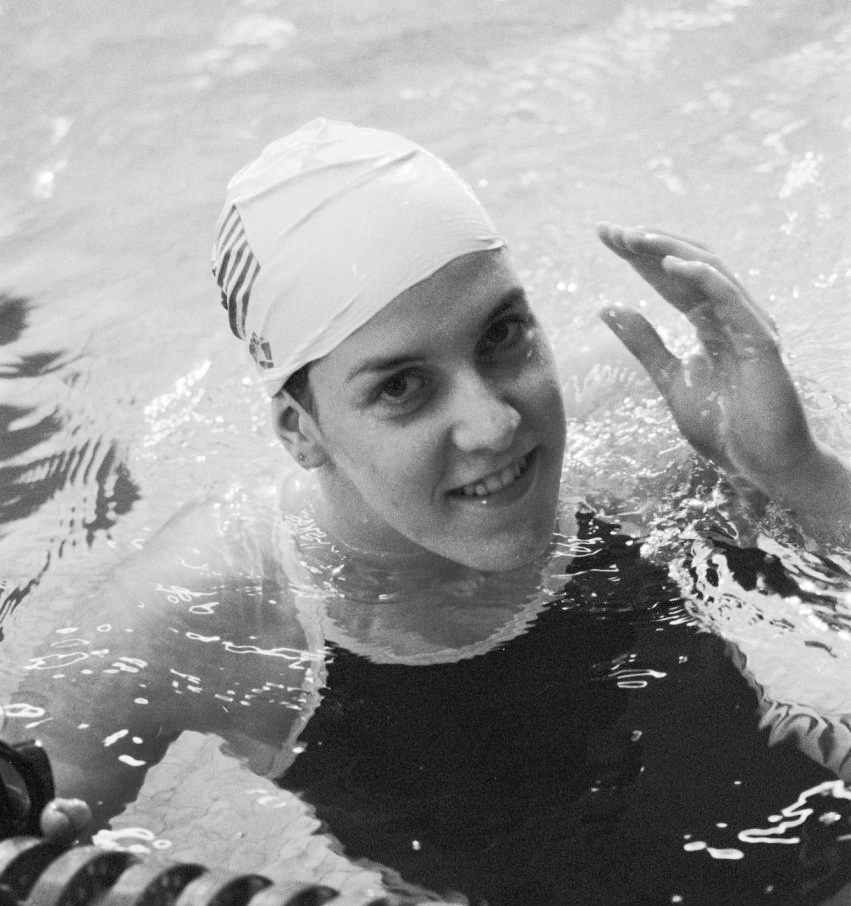
Tracy Caulkins

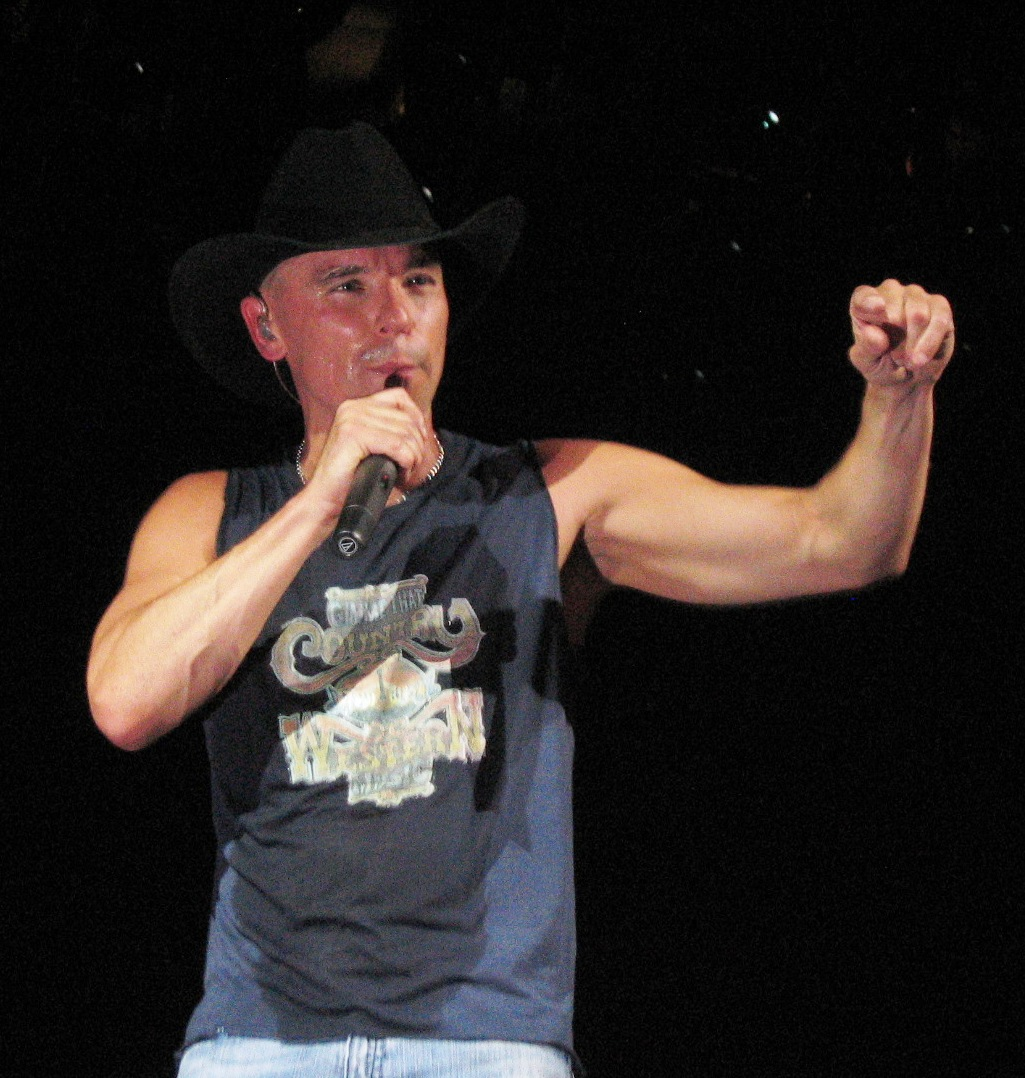
Kenny Chesney

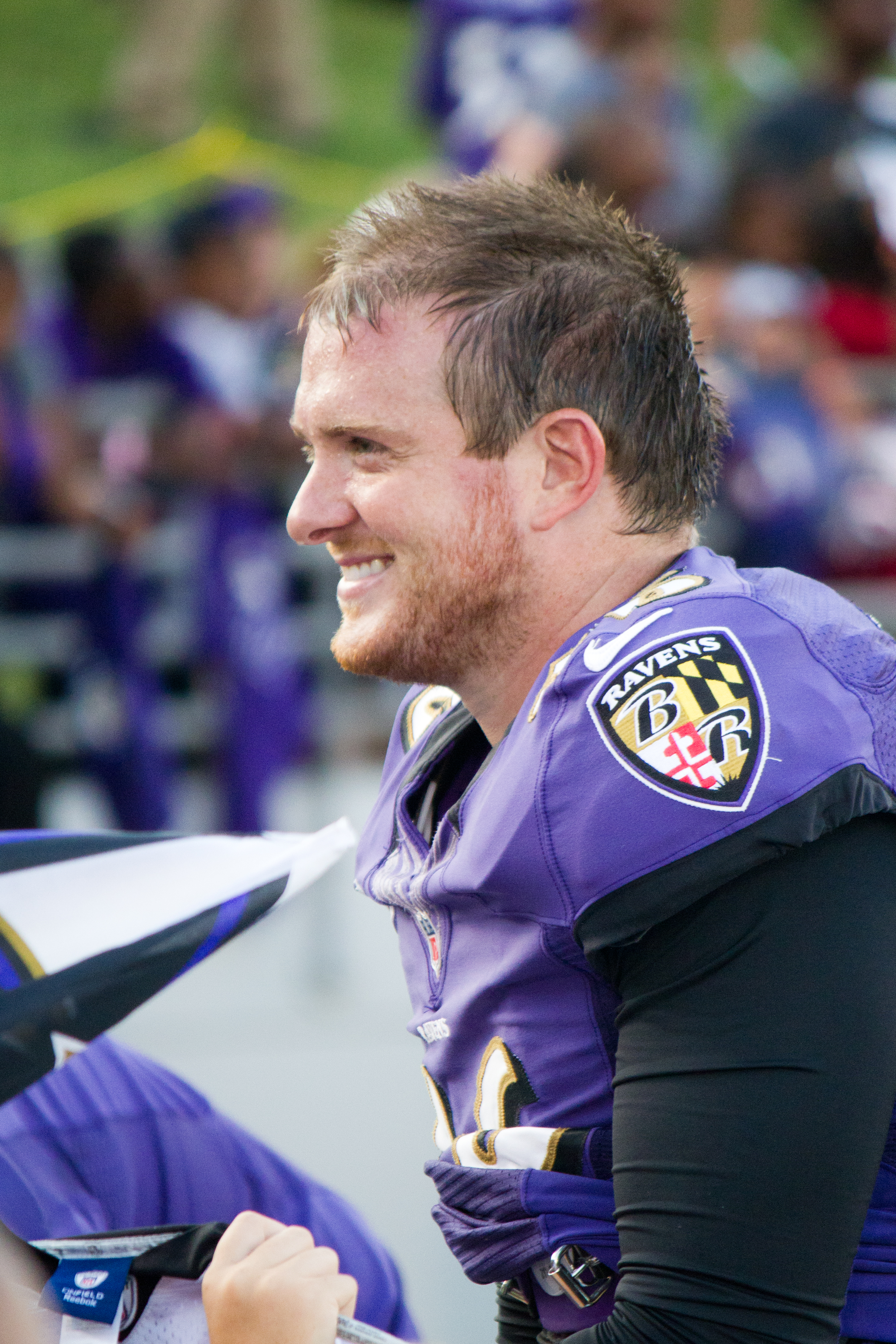
Morgan Cox

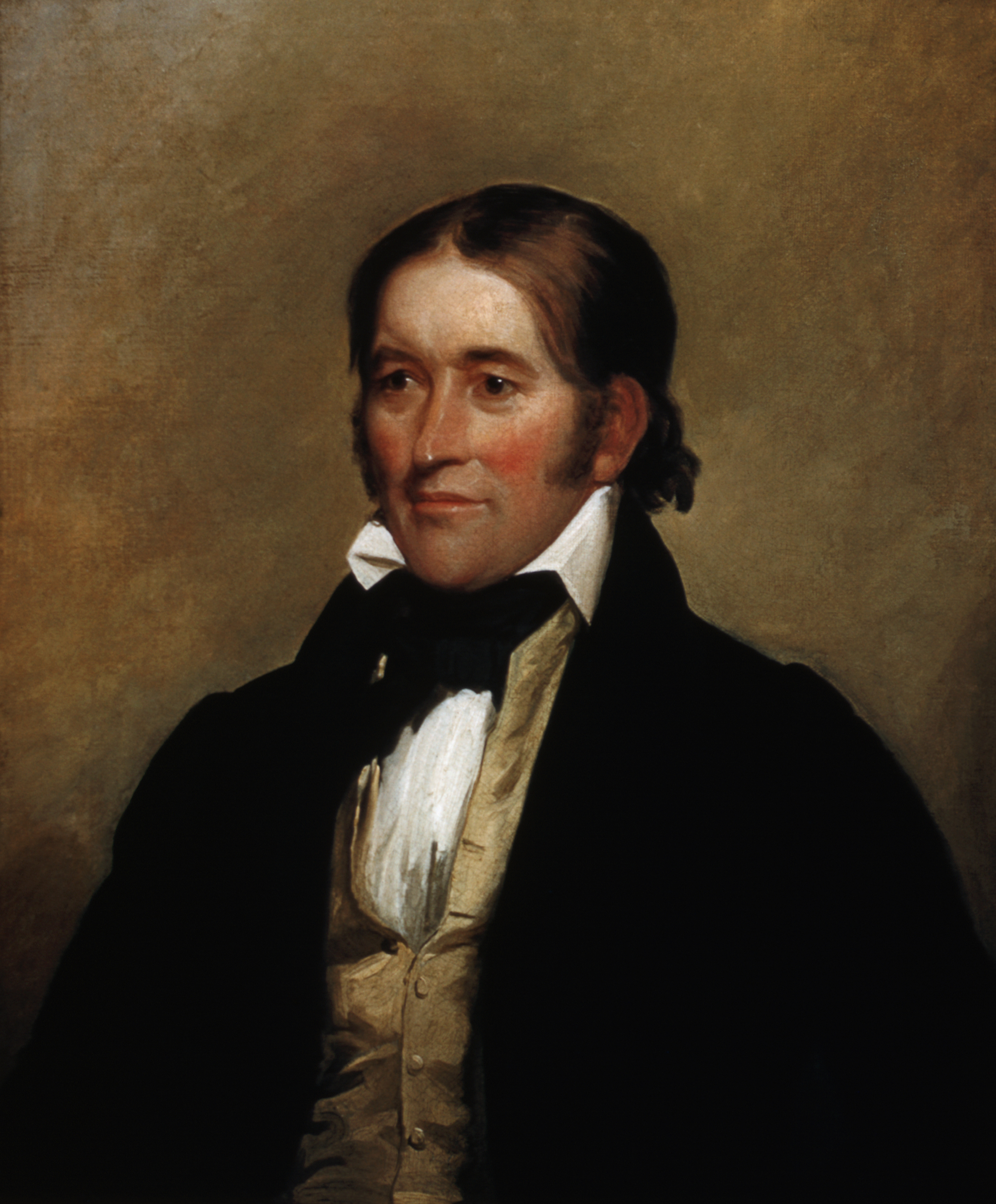
Davy Crockett

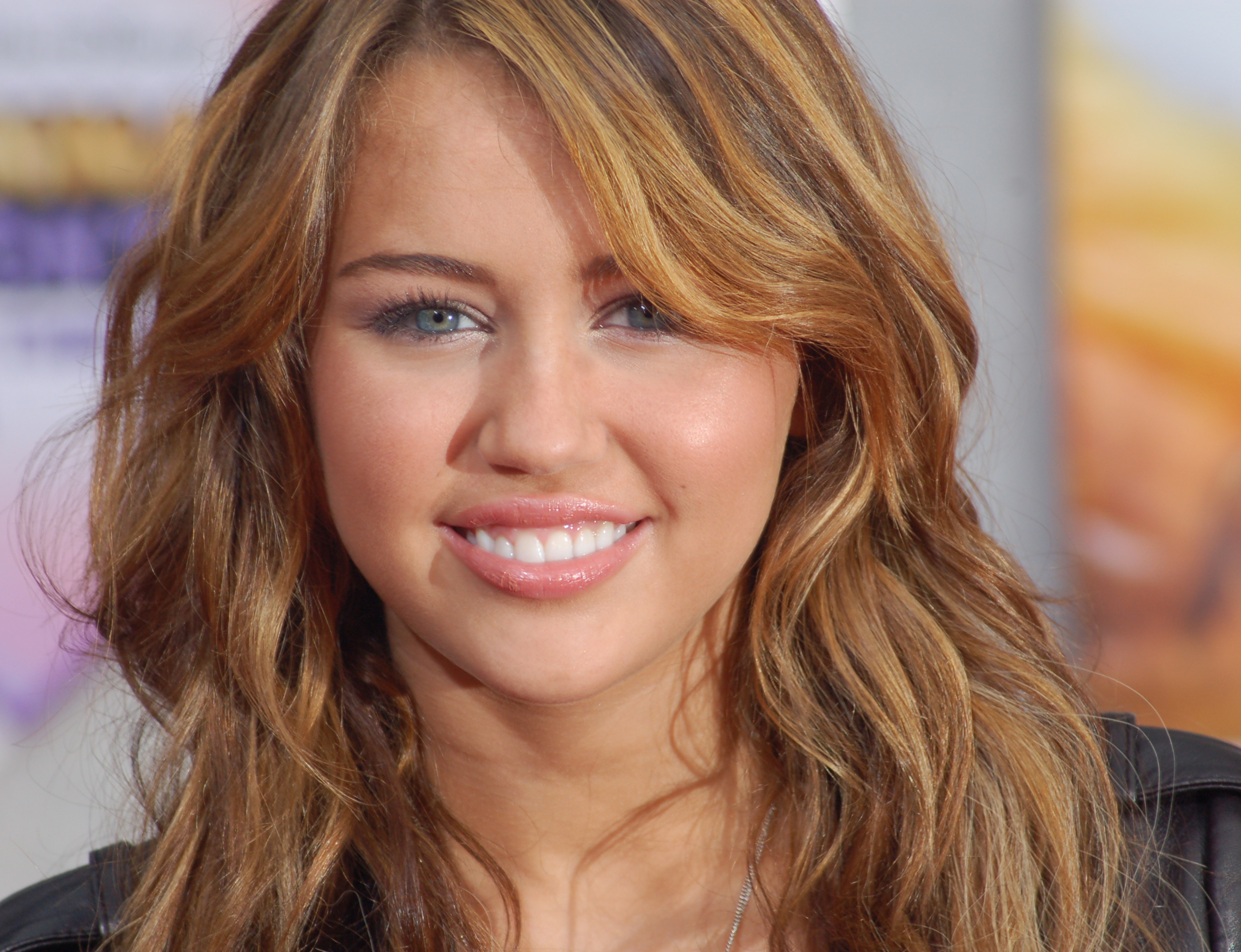
Miley Cyrus

- Matt Cain, baseball pitcher
- Howard Caine, actor
- Mike Caldwell, football player
- Duke Calhoun, football player
- Mickey Callaway, baseball pitcher, coach
- Archie Campbell, entertainer, Hee Haw star
- William B. Campbell, governor
- Guy Carawan, folk musician
- Hattie Caraway, politician
- Deana Carter, singer
- Dixie Carter, actress
- Nico Carvacho, basketball player
- Kellye Cash, 1987 Miss America
- June Carter Cash, singer
- Rosanne Cash, singer
- David Catching, singer
- John Catron, Supreme Court justice
- Tracy Caulkins, Olympic gold-medalist swimmer (born in Minnesota)
- Benjamin F. Cheatham, Confederate general
- Doc Cheatham, musician
- Kitty Cheatham, singer
- Richard Boone Cheatham, 19th-century mayor of Nashville
- Richard Cheatham, 19th-century congressman
- John R. Cherry III, film director
- Kenny Chesney, singer
- Henry Cho, comedian
- Tyson Clabo, football player
- Alysha Clark (born 1987), American-Israeli basketball player for the Israeli team Elitzur Ramla and the Las Vegas Aces of the Women's National Basketball Association (WNBA)
- Philander P. Claxton, educator
- Jim Clayton, housing developer
- Frank G. Clement, governor of Tennessee
- John Ray Clemmons (born 1977), member of the Tennessee House of Representatives
- Antonius Cleveland (born 1994), basketball player in the Israeli Basketball Premier League
- Chad Clifton, football player
- Randall Cobb, football player
- Fred Coe, television producer and director
- Michael Coe, football player
- Lynnette Cole, Miss USA 2000
- Mark Collie, singer
- Todd Collins, football player
- Britton Colquitt, football player
- Dustin Colquitt, punter for NFL's Kansas City Chiefs
- Darby Conley, cartoonist
- Lester Conner, basketball player and coach
- Barry Cook, film director
- John Cooper, musician, lead singer of Christian rock band Skillet
- Prentice Cooper, governor
- Mary Costa, opera singer, actress
- Jerome Courtland, actor, director
- John I. Cox, governor
- Morgan Cox, football player
- Cylk Cozart, actor
- Zack Cozart, baseball player
- James Craig, actor
- David "Davy" Crockett, frontiersman, politician, hero of the Alamo
- Dixie Lee Crosby, early 20th-century entertainer
- Edward Hull "Boss" Crump, politician, former mayor of Memphis
- John Cullum, actor
- Benny Cunningham, football player
- Lowell Cunningham, comic-book writer
- Elizabeth Litchfield Cunnyngham, missionary and church worker
- Brandi Cyrus, singer
- Miley Cyrus, singer
- Noah Cyrus, singer

== D ==
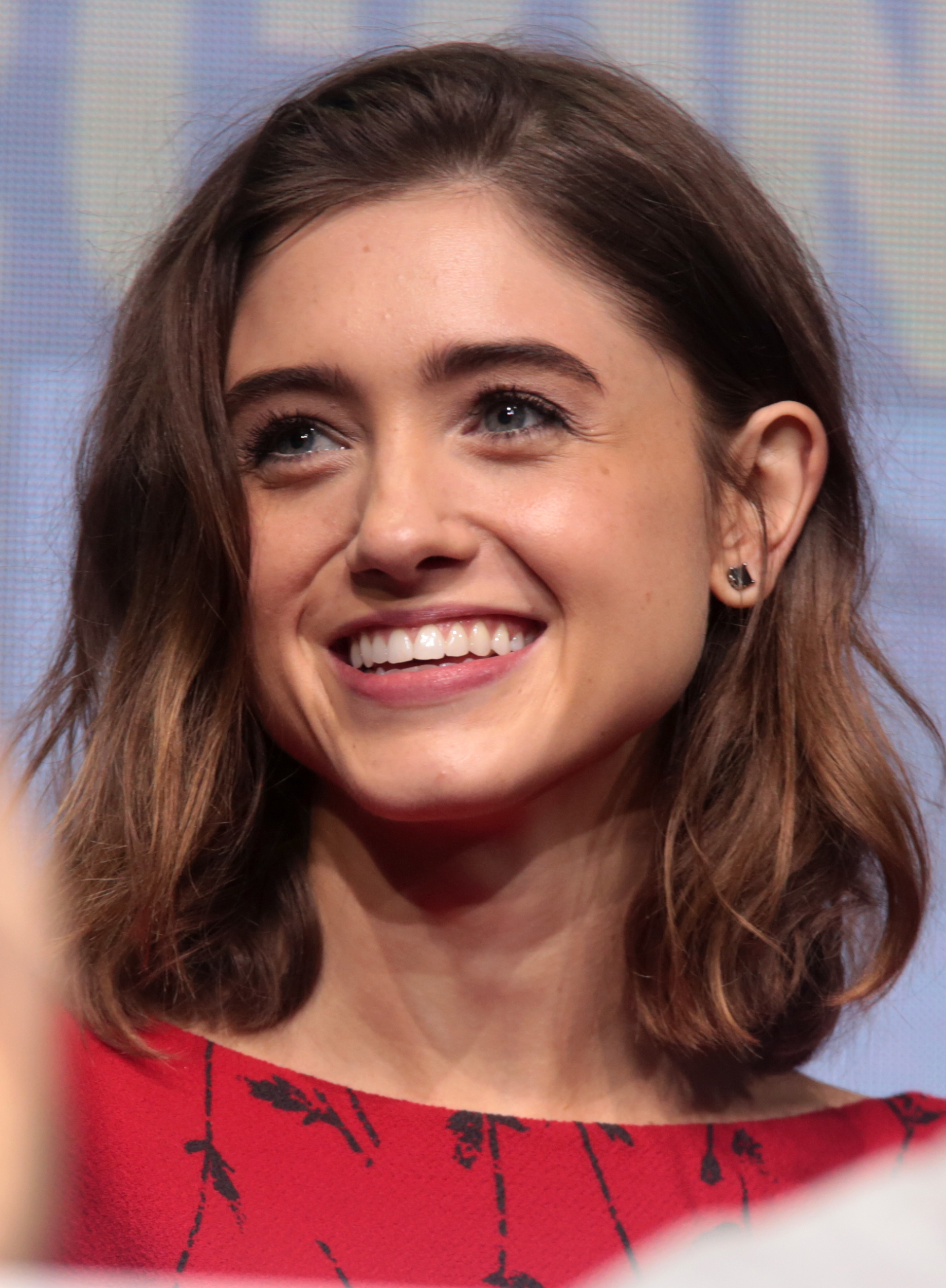
Natalia Dyer

- Rod Daniel, director
- Jasper Newton "Jack" Daniel, founder of the Jack Daniel's Tennessee whiskey distillery
- Orleans Darkwa, football player
- Jeremy Davis, musician (originally from Arkansas)
- Bill Dedman, journalist
- Beauford Delaney, painter
- Tony Delk, basketball player
- Rick Dempsey, baseball player
- George Roby Dempster, inventor
- Jamie Denton, actor
- Cleavant Derricks, actor, singer-songwriter
- Clinton Derricks-Carroll, actor, musician
- Dale Dickey, actress
- R. A. Dickey, baseball pitcher
- Bobby Dodd, football coach
- Shannen Doherty, actress
- Andrew Jackson Donelson, diplomat
- Aaron Douglas, painter
- Christopher Douglas, actor
- Johnny Duncan, singer
- King Dunlap, football player
- Donald "Duck" Dunn (1941–2012), bassist
- Natalia Dyer, actress

== E ==
- Justin Townes Earle, musician
- John Early, comedian, actor
- Edward H. East, acting governor
- William Edmondson, folk art sculptor
- Lindsay Ellis, YouTuber, author
- Dan Evins, founder of Cracker Barrel

== F ==
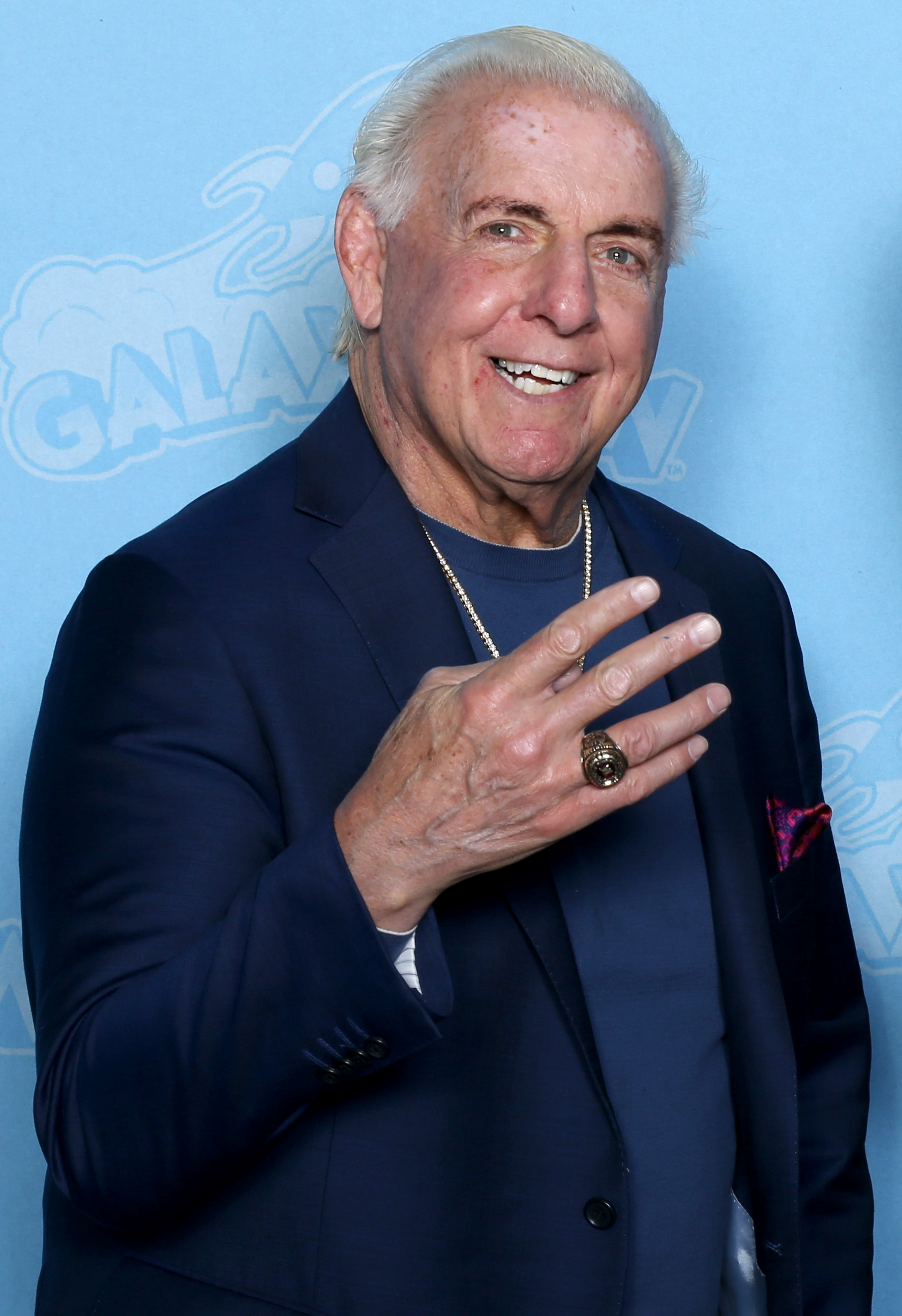
Ric Flair

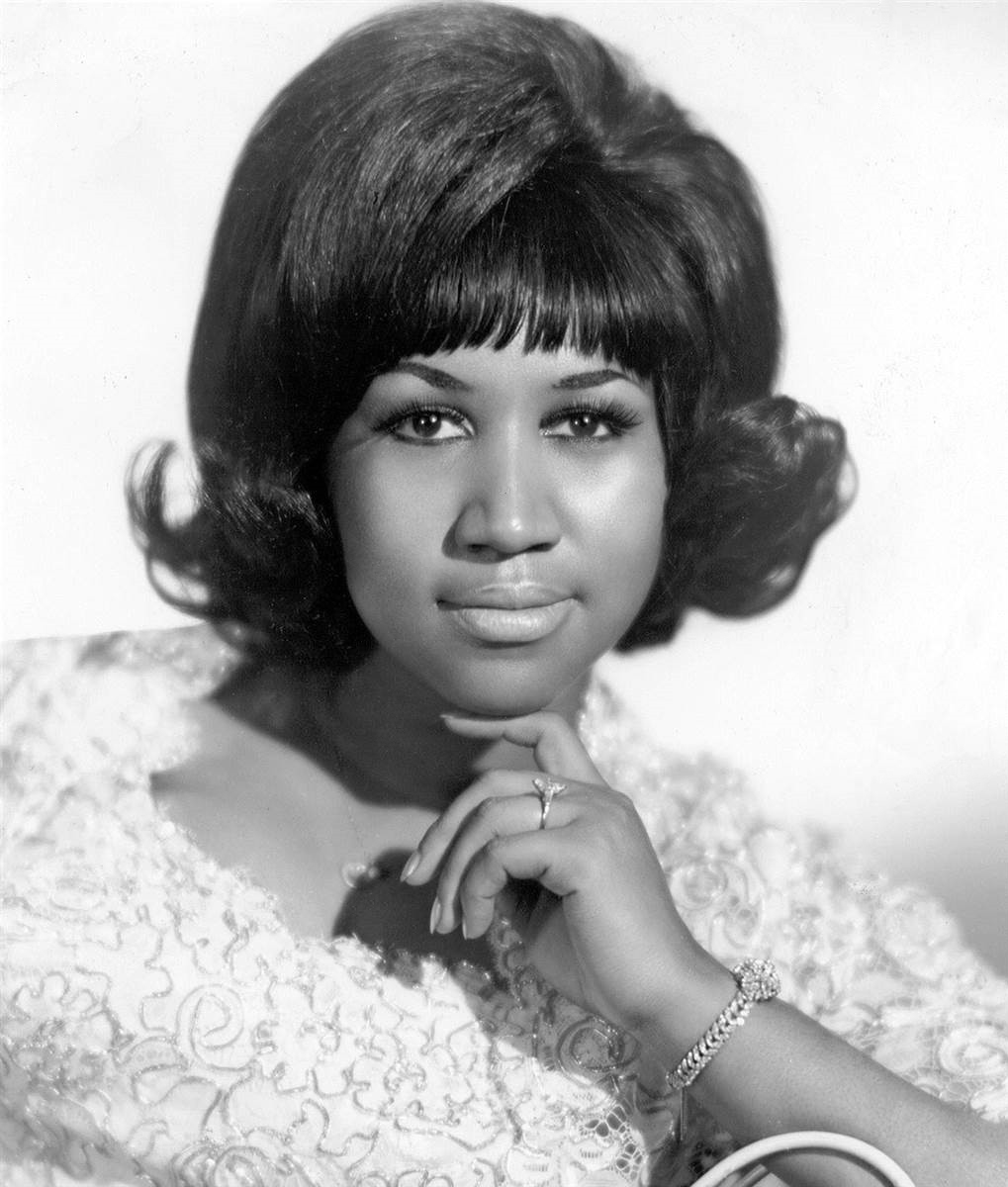
Aretha Franklin

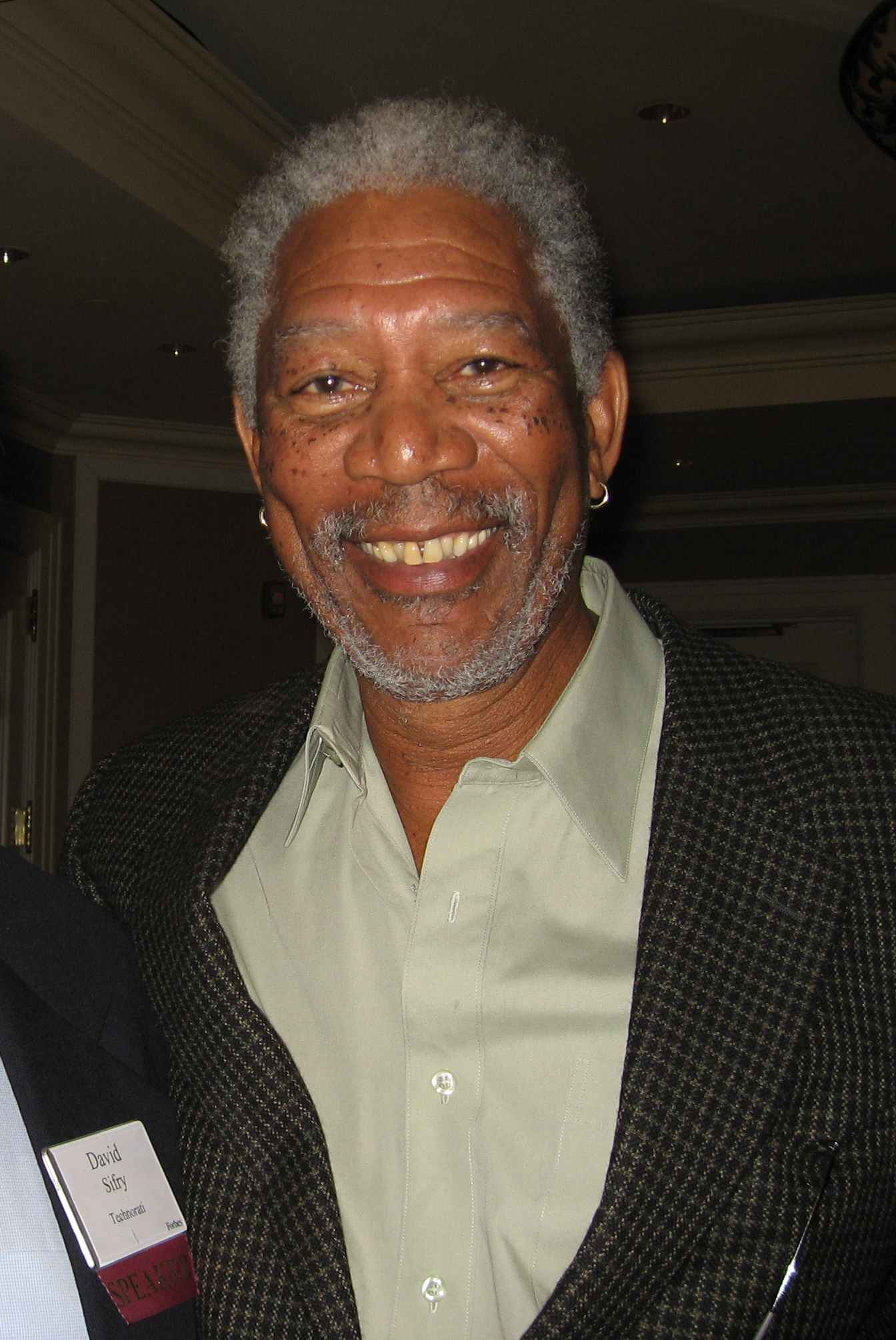
Morgan Freeman

- Nikki Fargas, basketball coach; grew up in Oak Ridge
- David Farragut, admiral
- Josh Farro, musician
- Zac Farro, musician
- Jerome Felton, football player
- Larry Finch, basketball player
- Chad Finchum, NASCAR driver
- Finesse2tymes, rapper
- Ric Flair, professional wrestler
- Lester Flatt, musician
- Bruce Fleisher, golfer
- Shelby Foote, author
- Colin Ford, actor
- Harold Ford Jr., politician
- Tennessee Ernie Ford, entertainer
- Nathan Bedford Forrest, American Civil War officer
- Logan Forsythe, baseball player
- Abe Fortas, U.S. Supreme Court justice
- Ramon Foster, football player
- Megan Fox, actress
- Aretha Franklin, singer
- Aubrayo Franklin
- James B. Frazier, governor
- Morgan Freeman, Academy Award-winning actor
- Bill Frist, physician and politician
- Phillip Fulmer, football coach

== G ==
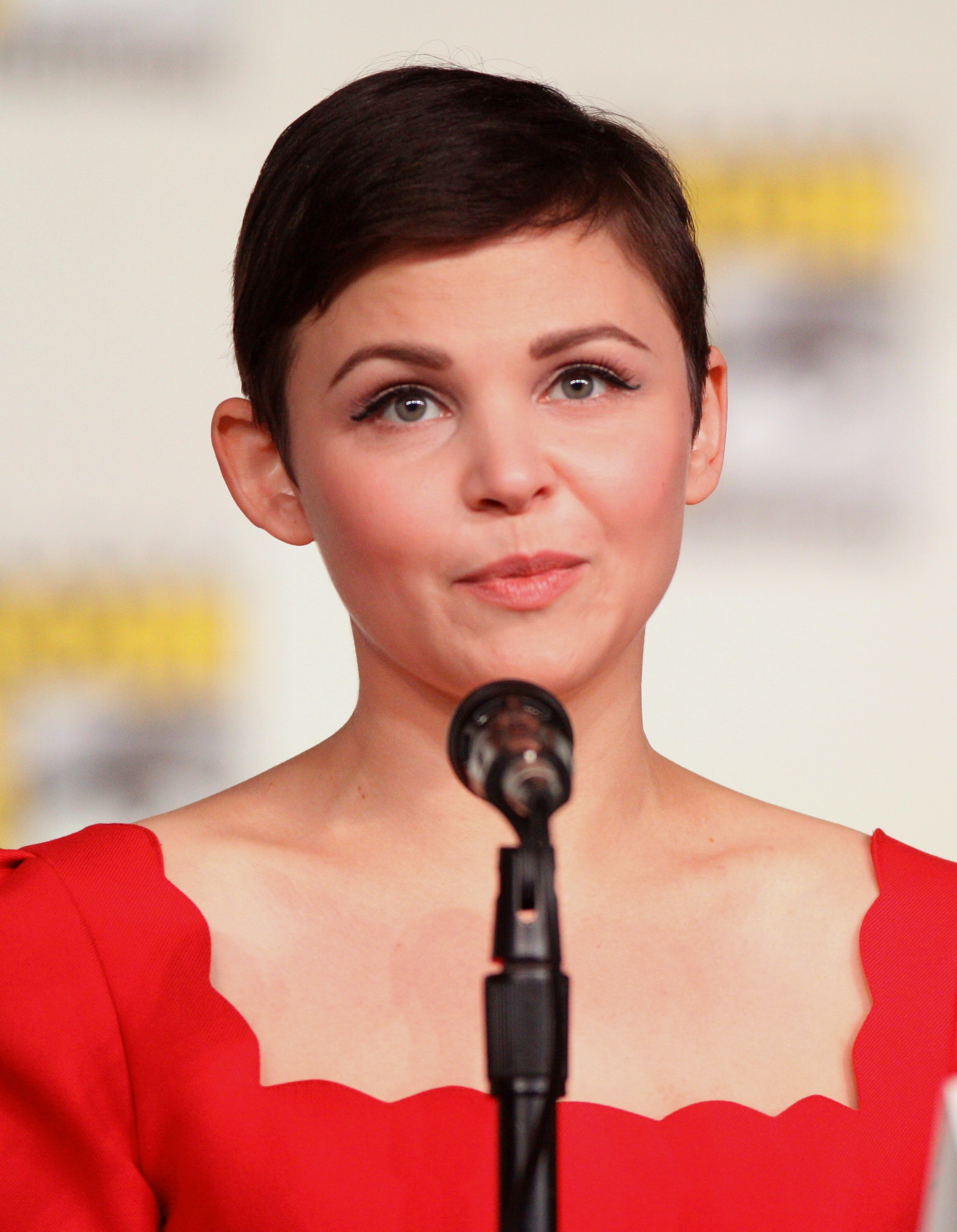
Ginnifer Goodwin

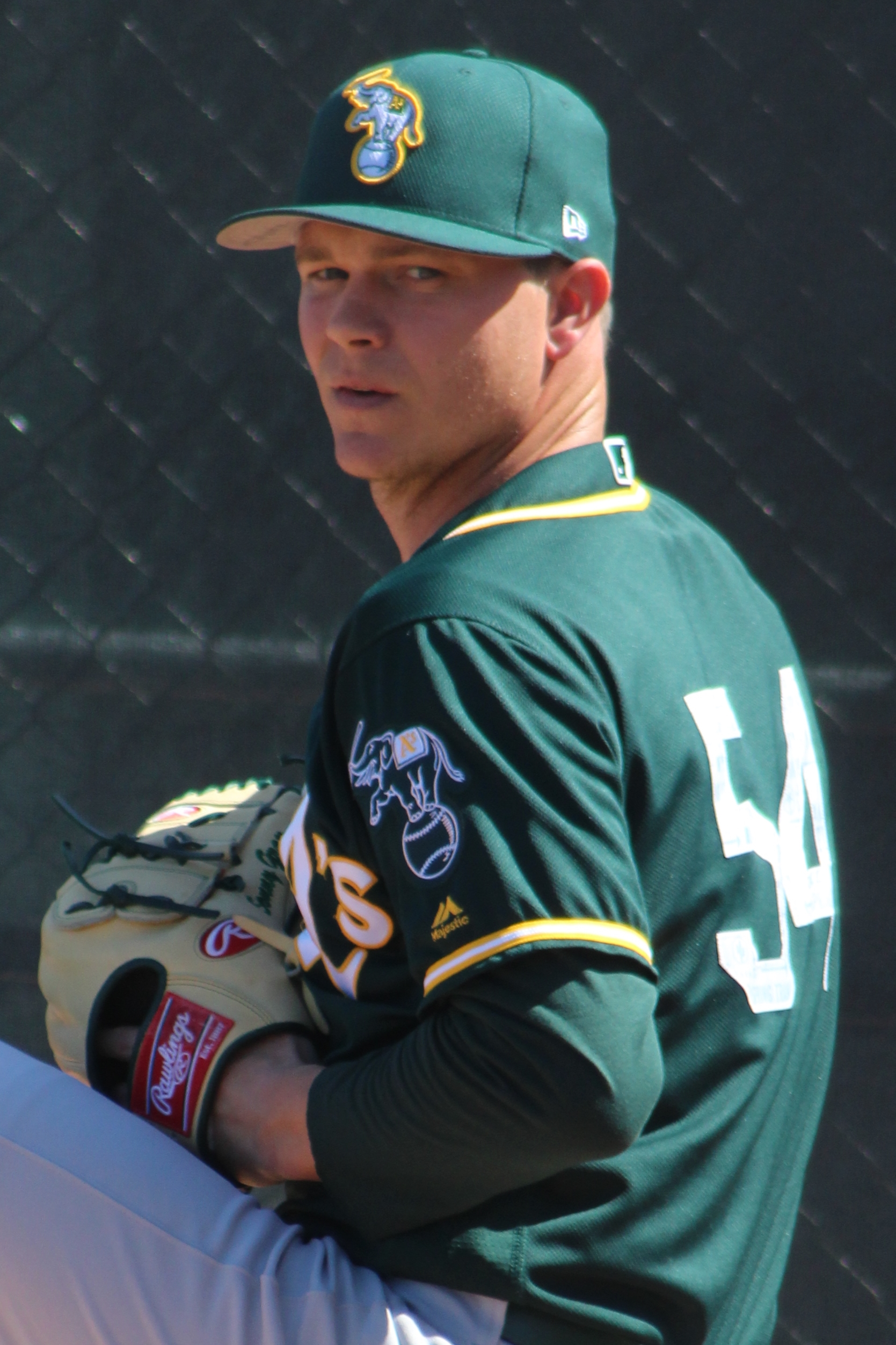
Sonny Gray

- A. H. Garland (1832–1899), politician; born in Tipton County
- Phil Garner, baseball player and manager
- Marc Gasol, basketball player
- Jacob Gentry, film director
- Annie Somers Gilchrist, writer
- Shai Gilgeous-Alexander, basketball player for the Oklahoma City Thunder, went to high school in Chattanooga
- Jim Gilliam, baseball player
- Nikki Giovanni (1943–2024), poet and educator
- Guilford Glazer, land developer
- Key Glock, rapper
- GloRilla, rapper
- Ernest William Goodpasture (1886–1960), physician
- Ginnifer Goodwin, actress
- Al Gore, former Tennessee senator, 45th vice president of the United States under Bill Clinton (1993–2001), and 2000 Democratic nominee for president
- Albert Gore, Sr. (1907–1998), politician, senator, father of Al Gore
- Yo Gotti, rapper
- Lou Graham, golfer, 1975 U.S. Open champion
- Aaron Grant, football player
- Sonny Gray, baseball player
- Jack Greene (1930–2013), musician
- Justin Grimm, baseball player
- Red Grooms, artist

== H ==
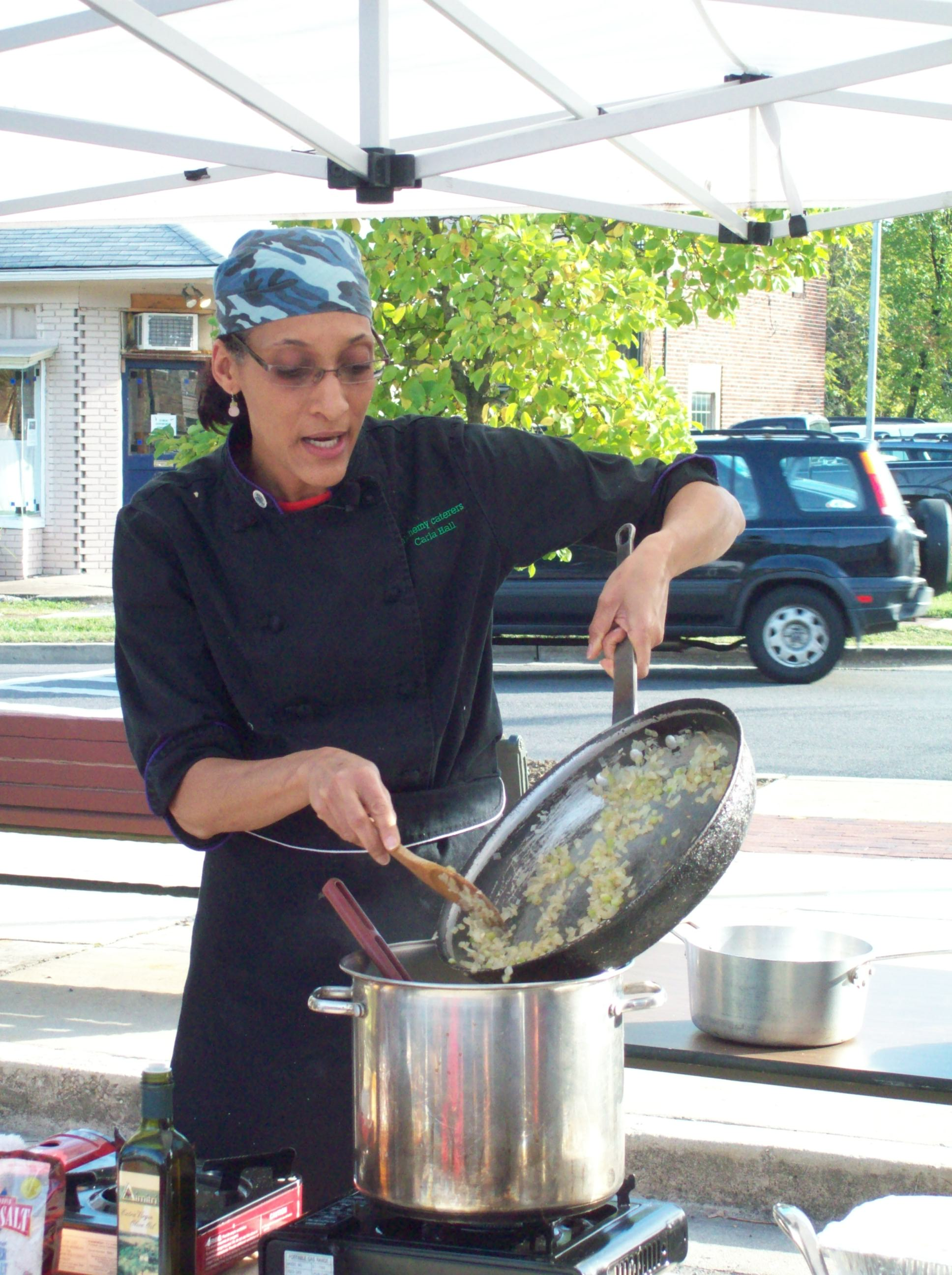
Carla Hall

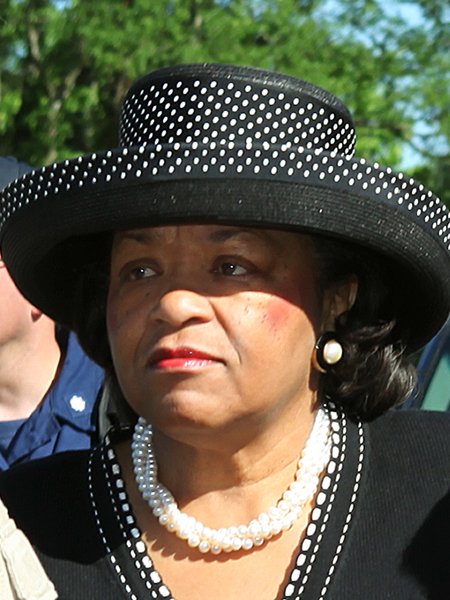
Thelma Harper

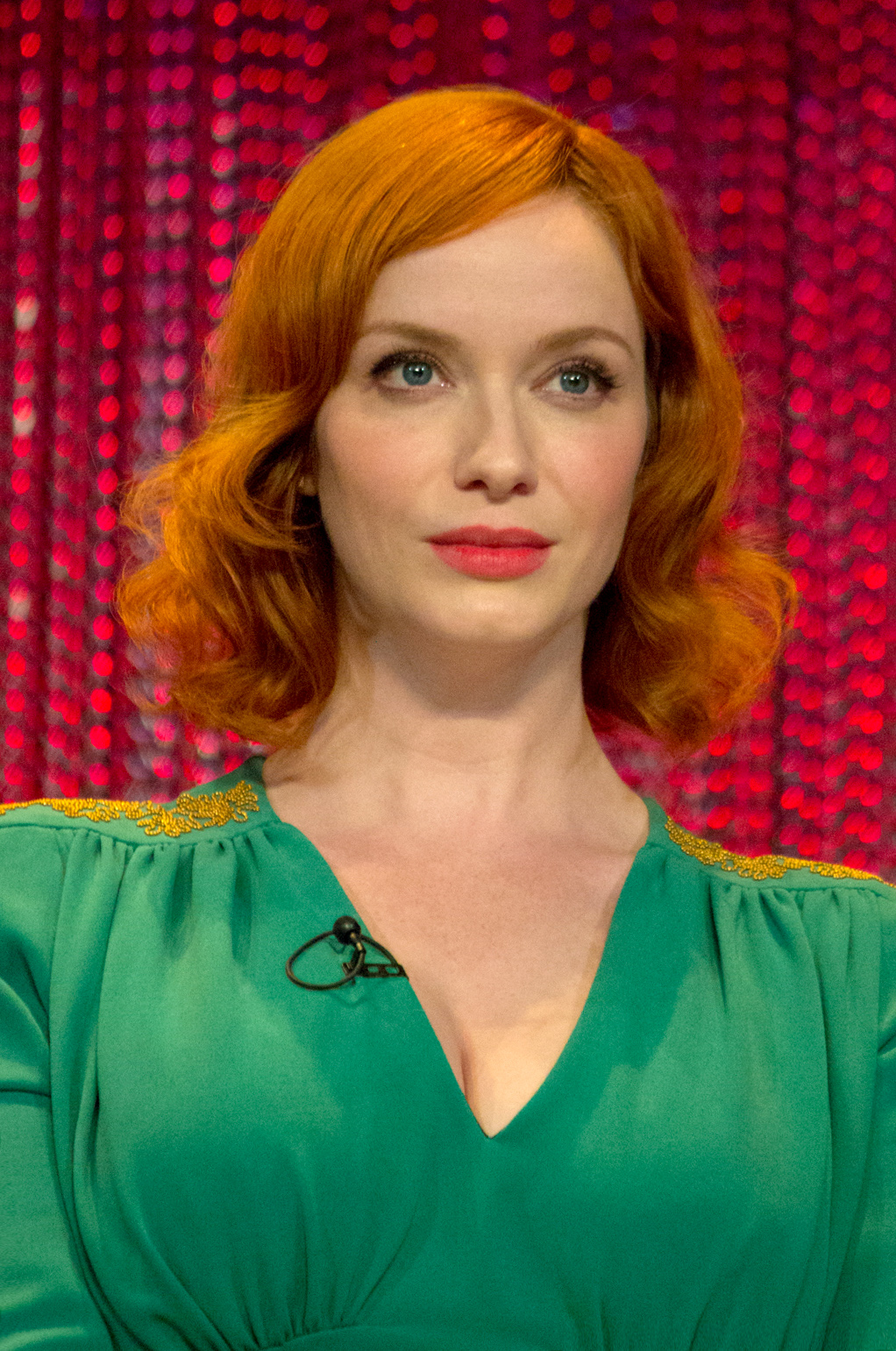
Christina Hendricks

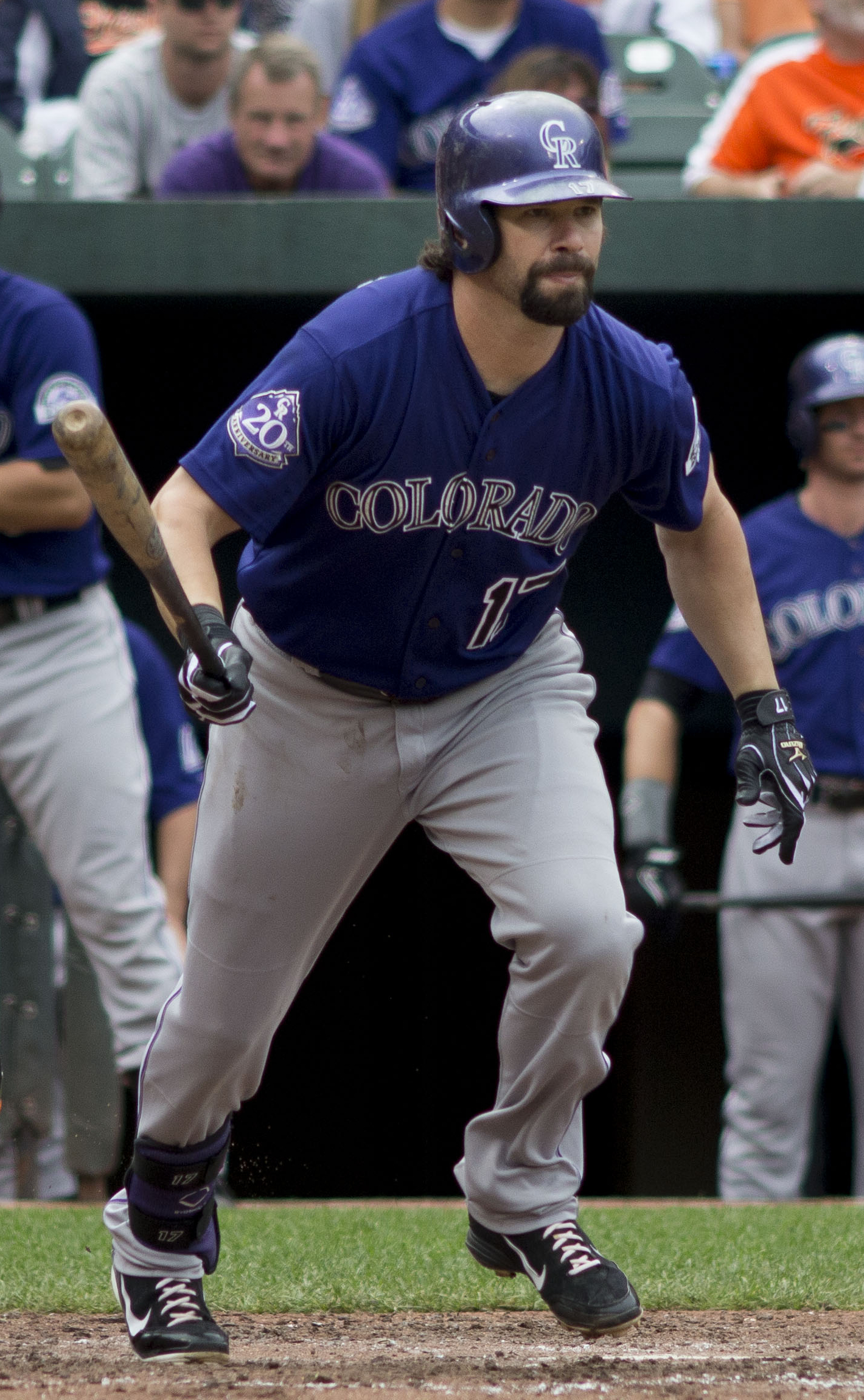
Todd Helton

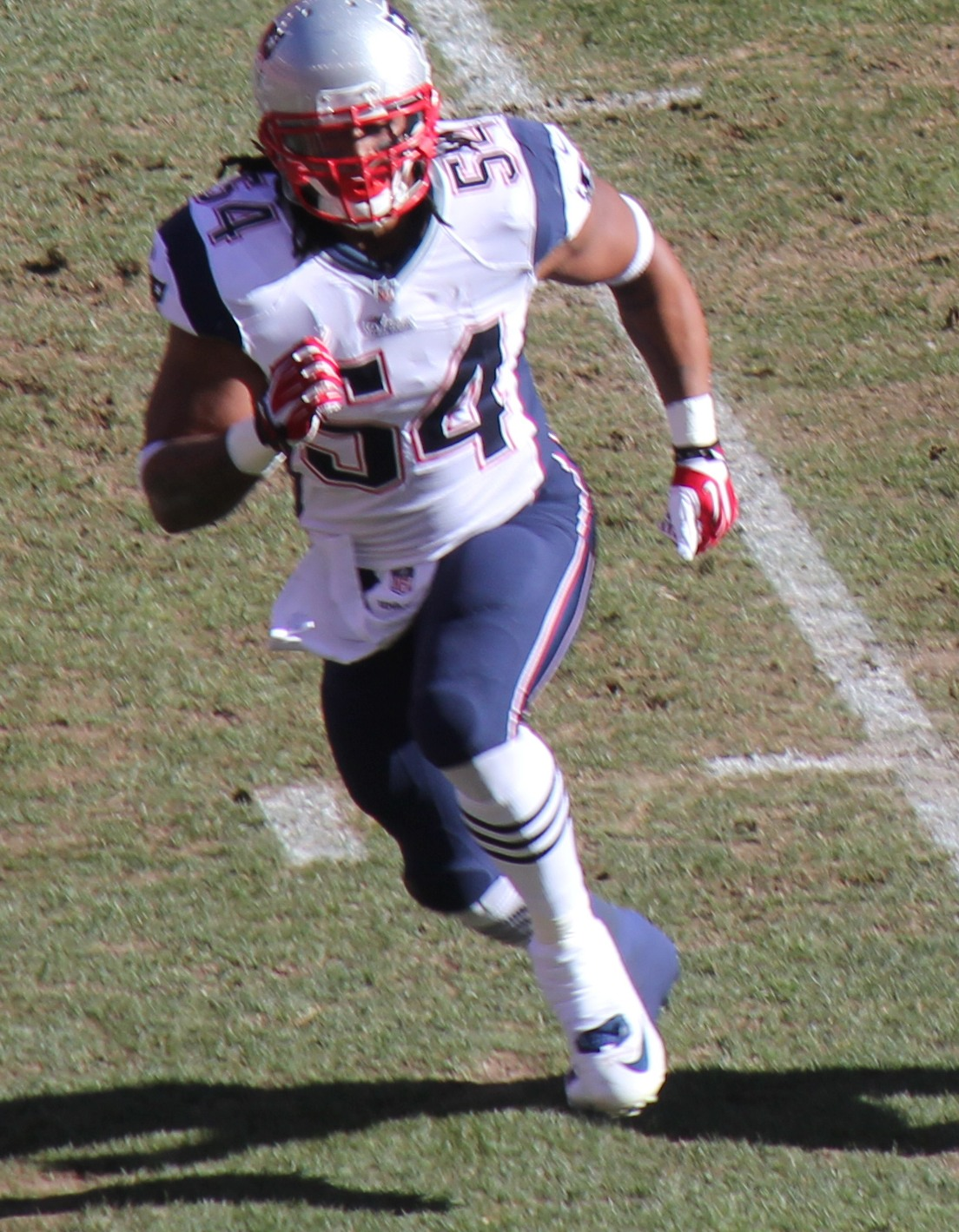
Dont'a Hightower

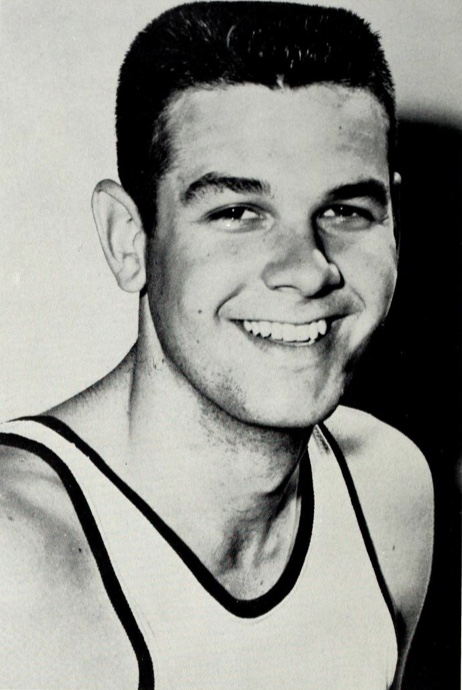
Bailey Howell

- Keith Habersberger, YouTuber, musician
- Wayne Haddix, football player
- Lucy Hale, actress and singer; Pretty Little Liars
- Alex Haley, author
- Carla Hall, chef
- George Hamilton, actor
- Ken Hamlin, football player
- W.C. Handy, composer
- Anne Haney, actress
- Jack Hanna, zookeeper
- William Happer, physicist
- Penny Hardaway, basketball player
- Chris Hardwick, comedian, actor, television personality, and host of At Midnight with Chris Hardwick; born in Kentucky but raised in Memphis
- Greg Hardy, football player
- Bill Harlow, freestyle and folkstyle wrestler
- Bob Harper, personal trainer
- Demonte Harper (born 1989), basketball player in the Israeli Basketball Premier League
- Thelma Harper, U.S. senator
- George "Two Ton" Harris, professional wrestler
- Isham G. Harris, governor and U.S. senator
- Mary Styles Harris, biologist, geneticist
- Phil Harris, actor, singer, bandleader
- Lori Harvey, model
- Dennis Haskins, actor
- Bill Haslam, former governor of Tennessee; owner of Nashville Predators
- James Haslam Jr., businessman, owner of NFL's Cleveland Browns
- Trenton Hassell, basketball player
- Donald Hawkins, football player
- Whit Haydn, magician
- Isaac Hayes, musician and actor
- Henry D. Haynes, "Homer" of Homer and Jethro
- Thomas "The Hitman" Hearns, boxer
- Todd Helton, baseball player
- Christina Hendricks, actress
- Elaine Hendrix, actress
- Dwight Henry, actor, baker
- Jim Hickman, baseball player
- Dont'a Hightower, football player
- Hunter Hillenmeyer, football player
- Thomas C. Hindman, Confederate general
- Will Hoge, musician
- Charles O. (Chad) Holliday, chief executive officer of Bank of America
- Austin Hollins (born 1991), basketball player for Maccabi Tel Aviv of the Israeli Basketball Premier League
- Rick Honeycutt, baseball pitcher and coach
- The Honky Tonk Man, professional wrestler
- John Jay Hooker, attorney
- Benjamin Hooks, minister, NAACP director
- Ben W. Hooper, governor
- Ed Hooper, author
- Myles Horton, educator
- Sam Houston, soldier and politician; namesake of Houston, Texas
- Bailey Howell, basketball player
- Allan B. Hubbard, National Economic Council Director
- Dakota Hudson, baseball player
- Dick Hudson, football player
- Thomas Hughes, English author of Tom Brown's School Days; founded Rugby, Tennessee
- Yolanda Hughes-Heying, IFBB professional bodybuilder
- Cordell Hull, U.S. Secretary of State; recipient, Nobel Peace Prize
- Claude Humphrey, football player
- Con Hunley, singer
- Courtney Hunt, screenwriter and director
- Alberta Hunter, blues singer
- Les Hunter, basketball player
- Dennis Hwang, graphic artist

== J ==
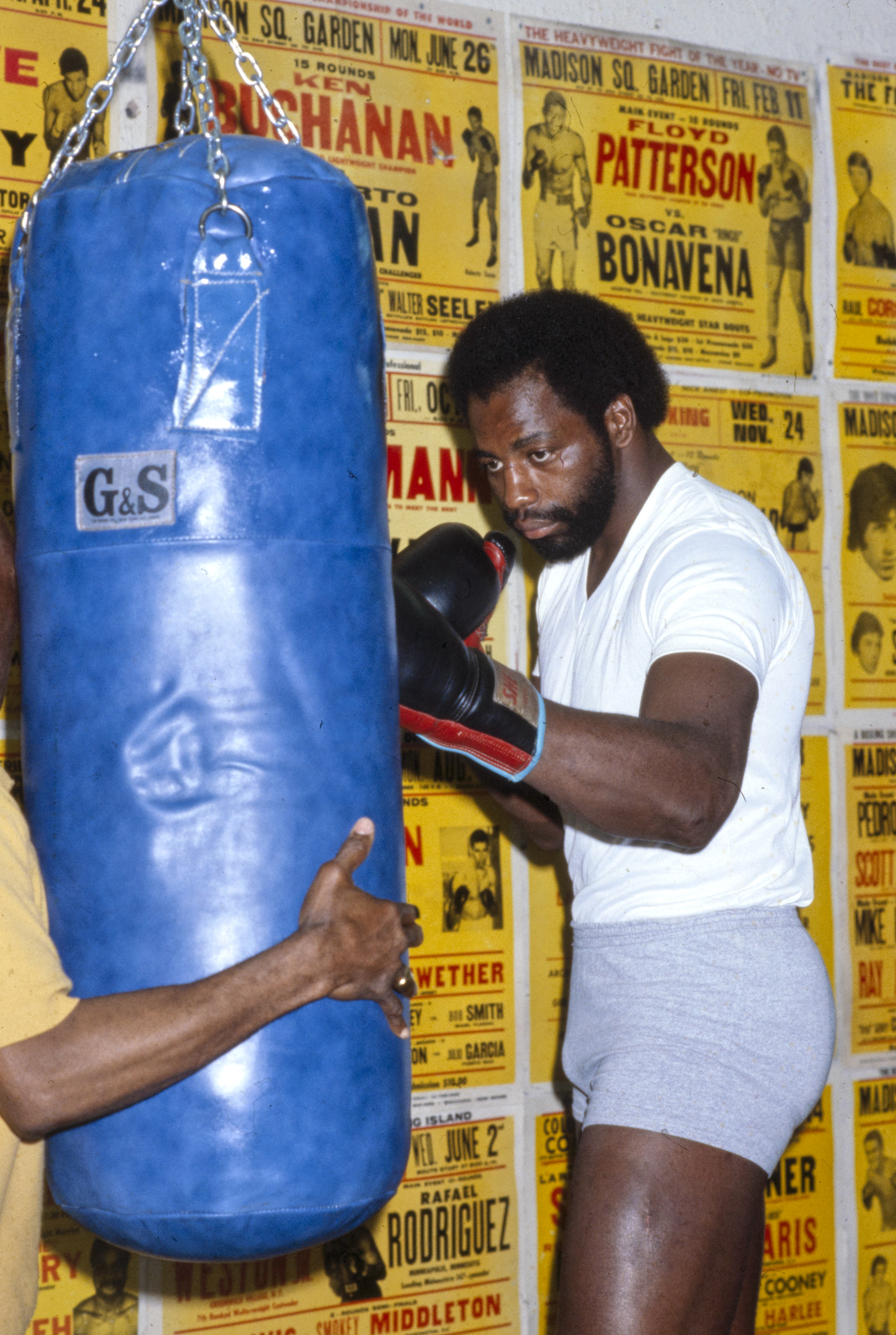
Ed "Too Tall" Jones

- Juicy J, rapper and producer
- Al Jackson Jr. (1935–1975), drummer
- Andrew Jackson, seventh president of the United States (1829–1837)
- Howell Edmunds Jackson, Supreme Court Justice
- Quinton Jackson, former UFC light heavyweight champion; born in Memphis
- Mark Jacoby, performer
- Claude Jarman Jr., actor
- Jeff Jarrett, professional wrestler
- Josh Jasper (born 1987), All-American college football player (placekicker)
- Carol Mayo Jenkins, actress
- Chad Jenkins, baseball player
- John Jenkins, basketball player
- William L. Jenkins, U.S. House of Representatives (R-TN-01) (1997–2007)
- John Jerry, football player
- Peria Jerry, football player
- Michael Jeter, actor
- Andrew Johnson, 17th president of the United States (1865–1869)
- Cave Johnson, politician and U.S. postmaster general (1865–1869)
- Dwayne Johnson, actor and professional wrestler; attended McGavock High School in Nashville
- Thomas Johnson, football player
- Allan Jones, businessman and founder of Check Into Cash
- Booker T. Jones (born 1944), multi-instrumentalist and songwriter
- Cherry Jones, actress
- Christopher Jones, actor
- Coco Jones, singer
- Ed "Too Tall" Jones, football player
- Jesse Holman Jones, politician
- Mary Jane Richardson Jones, abolitionist and activist
- Popeye Jones, basketball player
- Van Jones, environmental advocate
- Caleb Joseph, baseball player

== K ==
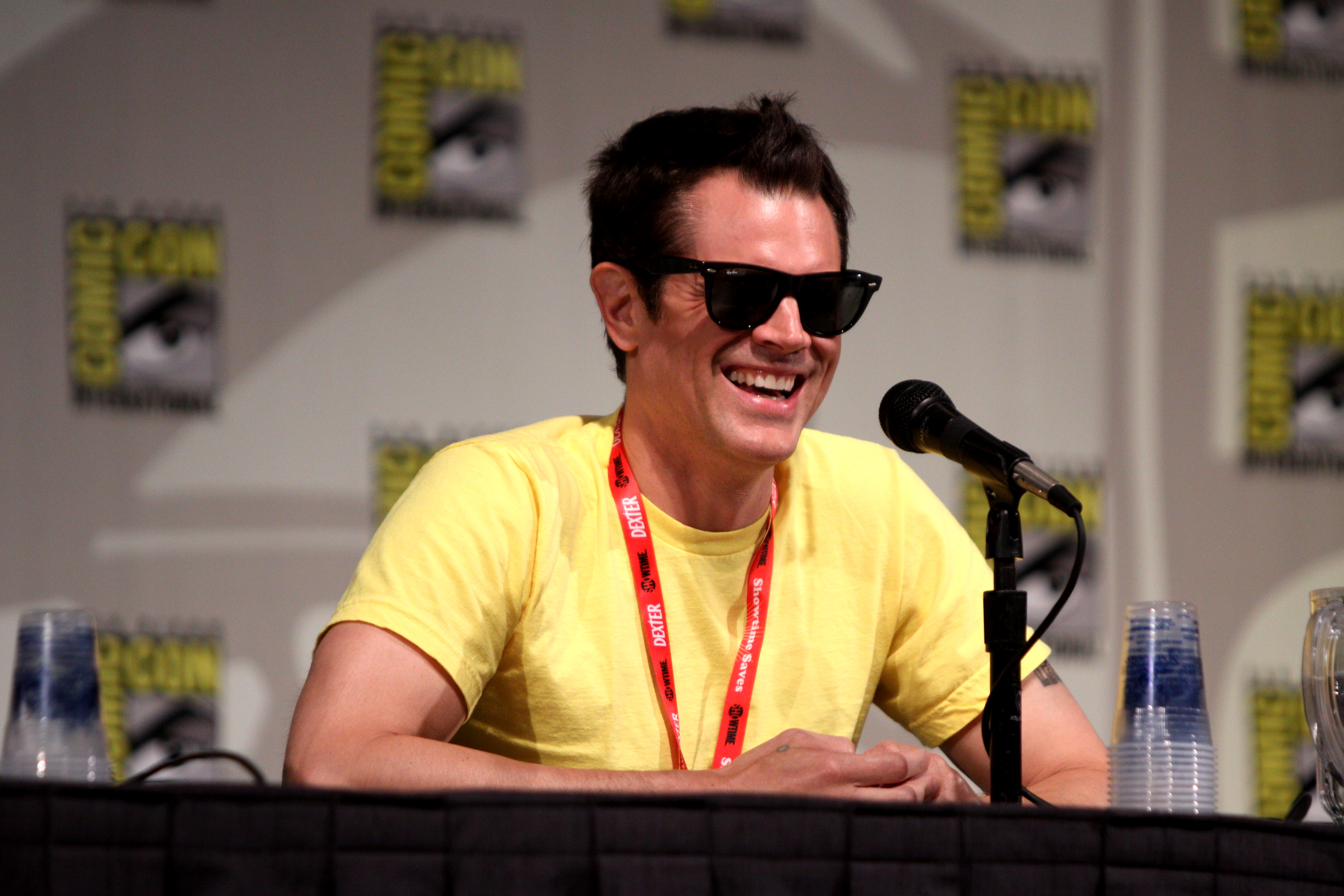
Johnny Knoxville

- Huda Kattan, CEO Huda Beauty
- Margaret Keane, artist
- Josh Kear, songwriter
- Josephine E. Keating, musician, music teacher, critic
- Estes Kefauver, U.S. senator
- David Keith, actor
- Frank B. Kelso II, admiral
- K.Michelle, singer
- Kem, singer
- Tony Kemp, baseball player
- Kesha, singer
- Daniel Kilgore, football player
- Johnny Knoxville, actor
- Rachel Korine, actress
- Bill Kovach, journalist
- Joseph Wood Krutch, naturalist

== L ==
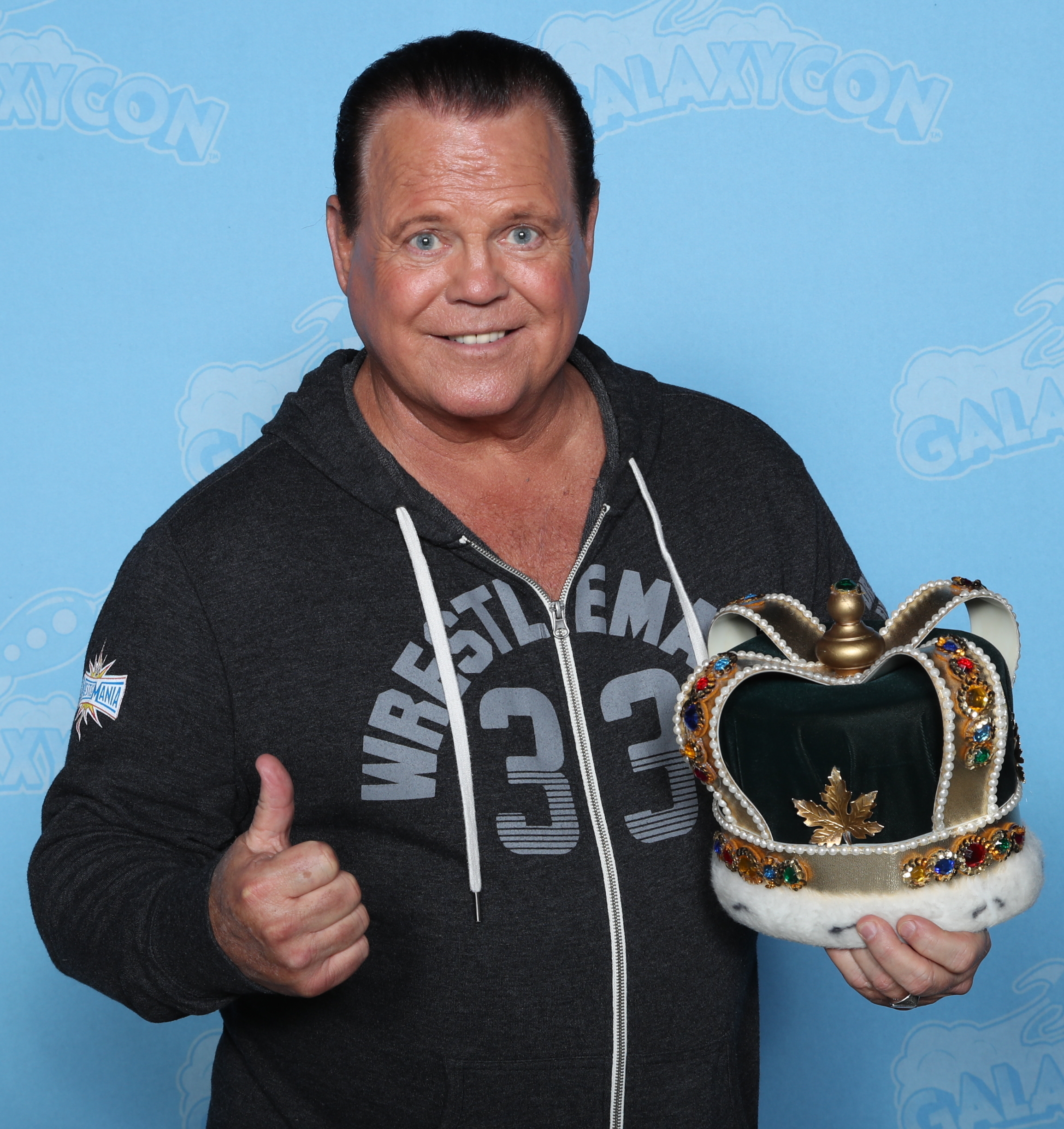
Jerry Lawler

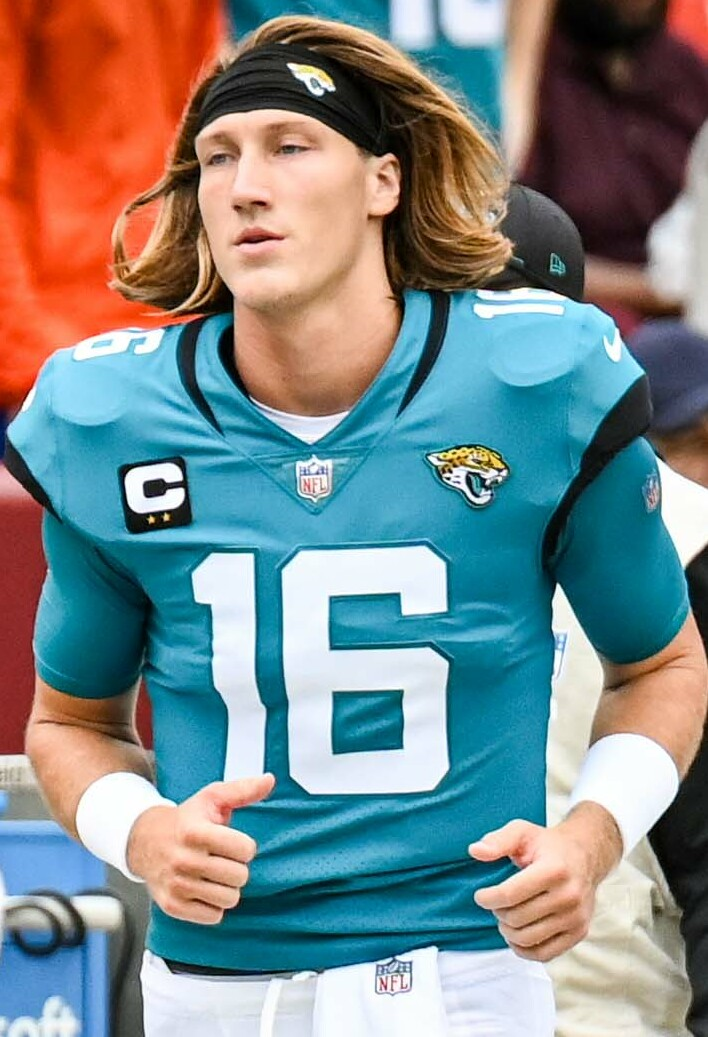
Trevor Lawrence

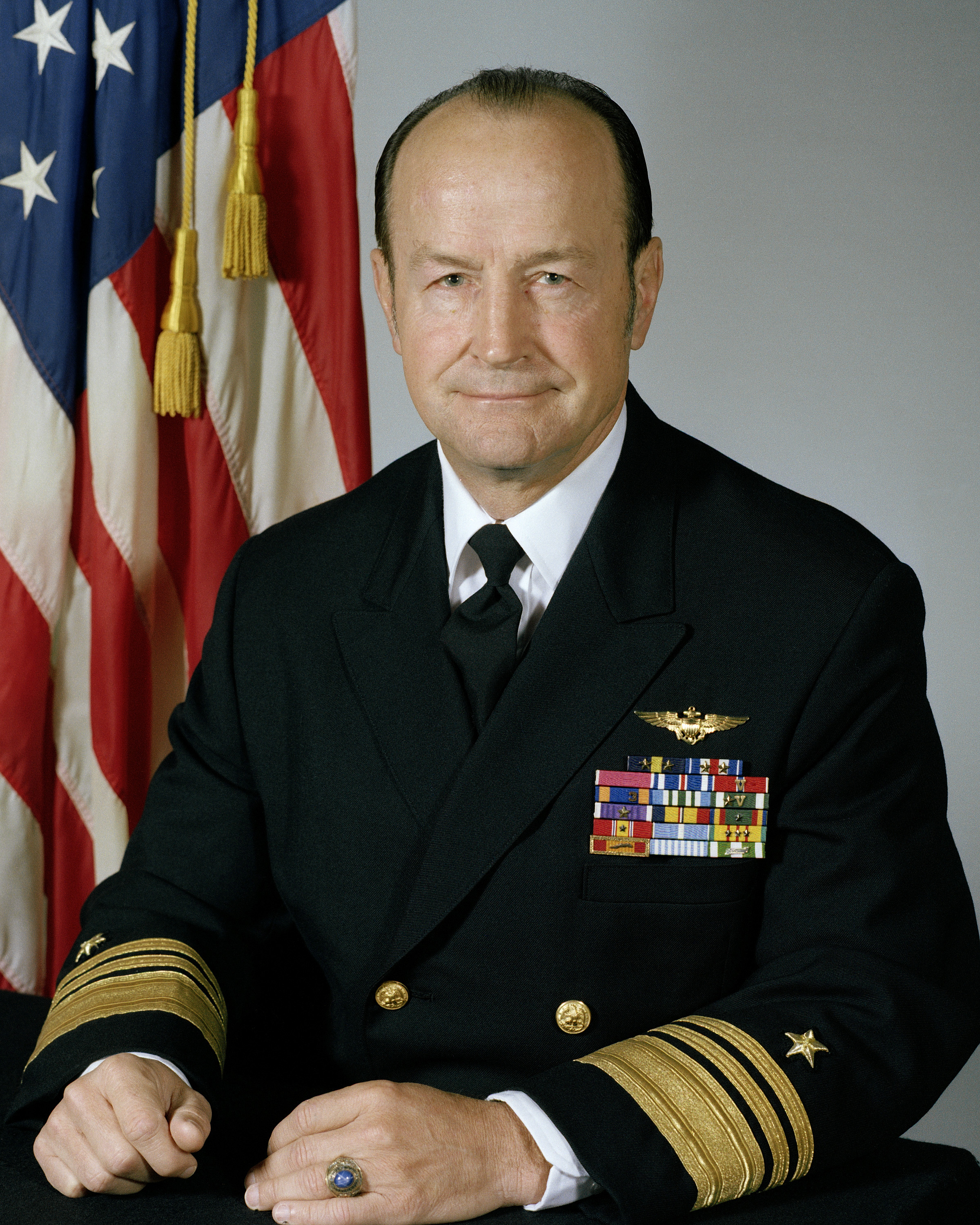
William P. Lawrence

- "Nature Boy" Buddy Landel, professional wrestler
- Dan Landrum, hammered-dulcimer player
- Walter Lang, film director
- Lucille La Verne, actress
- Jerry "The King" Lawler, professional wrestler
- Renee Lawless, actress, singer
- Trevor Lawrence, NFL quarterback, first overall pick of 2021 NFL draft
- William P. Lawrence, U.S. Navy vice admiral
- Arthur Lee, musician
- Bill Lee (born 1959), former governor of Tennessee;
- Clyde Lee, basketball player
- Kai-Fu Lee, Google executive
- Adriane Lenox, actress
- D. D. Lewis, football player
- Steve Liddle, baseball coach
- Beth Littleford, actress, comedian
- Sondra Locke, actress
- Z. Alexander Looby, lawyer
- Horace Harmon Lurton, Supreme Court justice
- Dustin Lynch, singer
- Andrew Nelson Lytle, novelist

== M ==
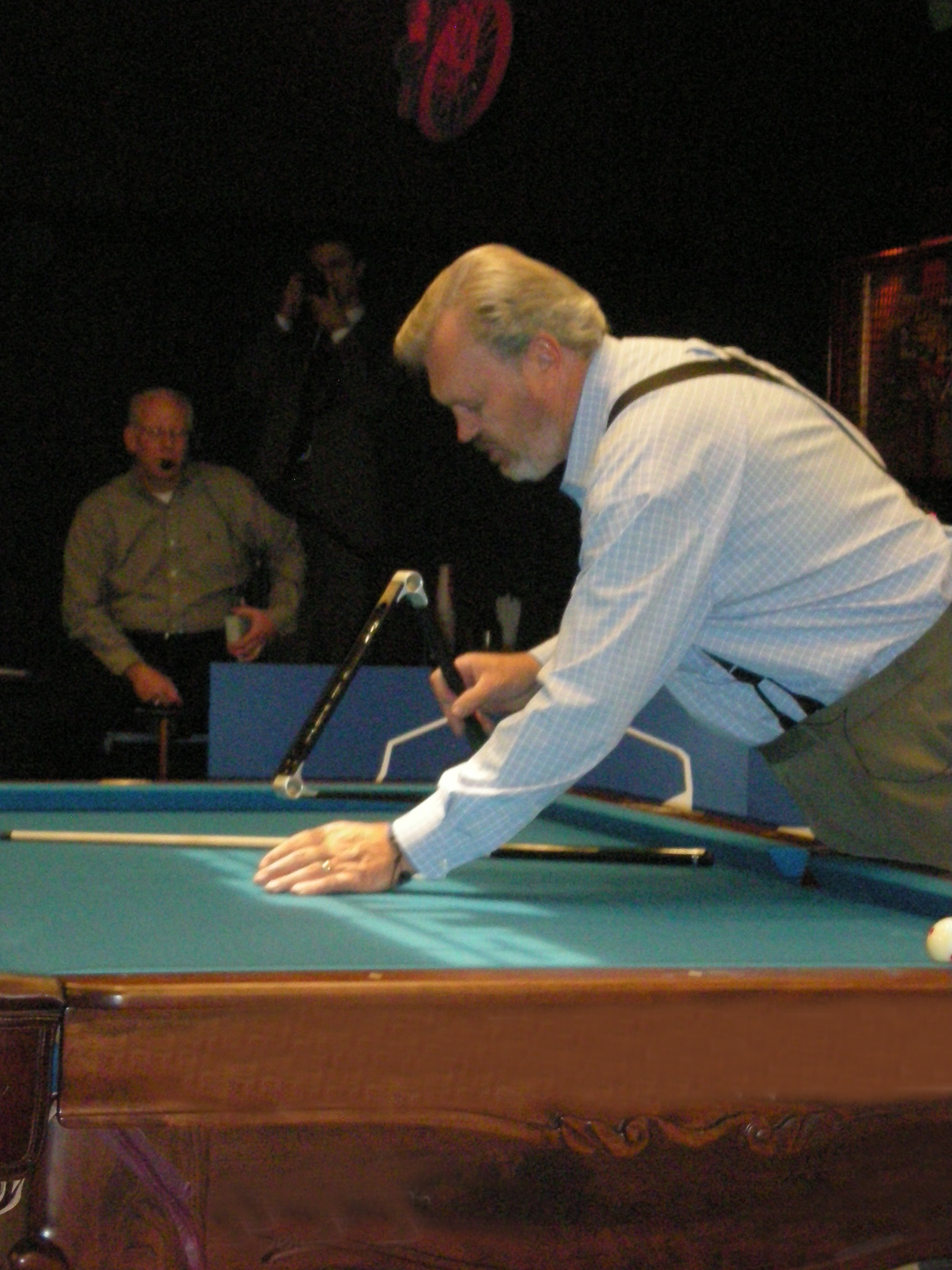
Mike Massey

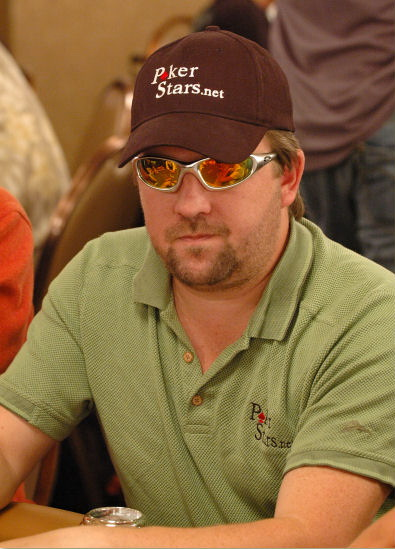
Chris Moneymaker

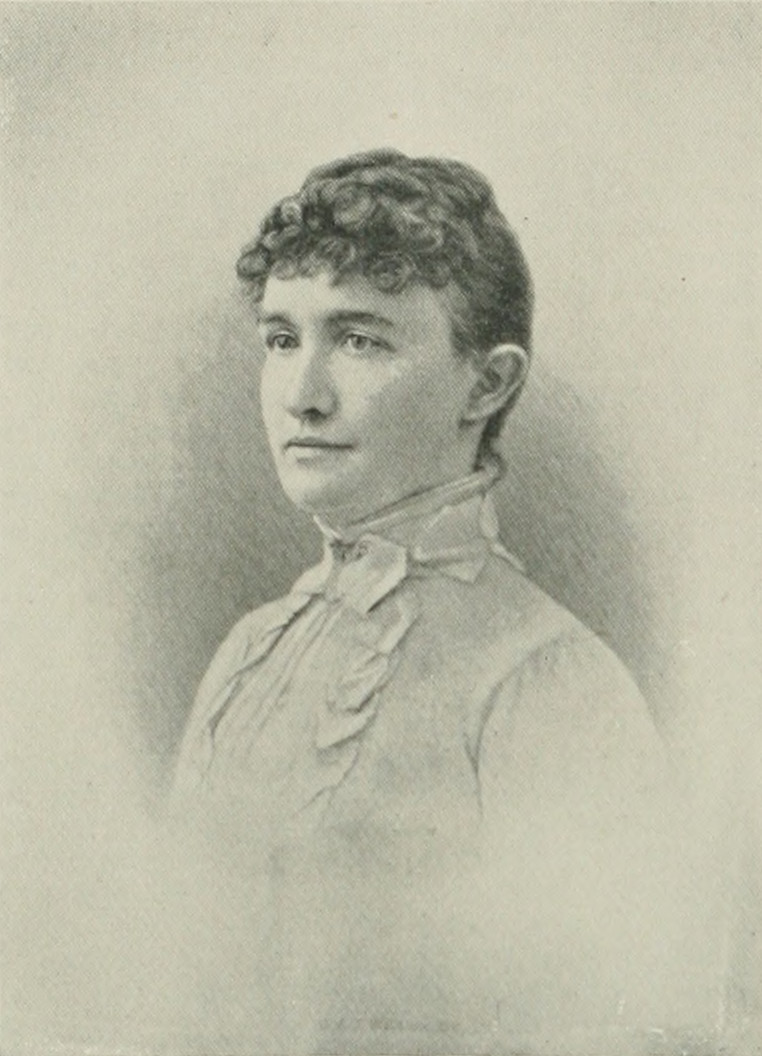
Mary Noailles Murfree

- Jean (Faircloth) MacArthur, heiress, wife of General Douglas MacArthur
- "Uncle Dave" Macon, musician and comedian
- Bill Madlock, baseball player
- Matt Mahaffey, musician
- Johnny Majors, football coach
- Delbert Mann, screenwriter and director
- Nick Marable, freestyle and folkstyle wrestler
- Jamie Marchi, voice actress
- Shawn Marion, basketball player
- Sterling Marlin, two-time Daytona 500 winner
- Wink Martindale, television personality
- Shaq Mason, football player
- Christopher Massey, actor, rapper
- Mike Massey, professional pool player
- Matthew Fontaine Maury, oceanographer, astronomer
- William Gibbs McAdoo, politician
- Hill McAlister, governor
- Macon McCalman, actor
- Cormac McCarthy, novelist
- Tim McCarver, baseball player and broadcaster
- Byron McKeeby, artist and educator
- Ted McClain, basketball player
- Jacques McClendon, football player
- Michael McDonald, singer
- Brownie McGhee, musician
- Stick McGhee, musician
- Ralph McGill, journalist
- Kenneth McKellar, politician
- Reggie McKenzie, football player and executive
- Bill McKinney, actor
- Ellen McLain, opera singer, voice actress
- Jon Meacham, publishing executive
- Jodie Meeks, basketball player
- Ron Mercer, basketball player
- Cary Middlecoff, golfer
- Jerry Minor, actor
- Mike Minor, baseball pitcher
- John Mitchell, baseball pitcher
- Chris Moneymaker, poker player; from Knoxville
- Ashley Monroe, singer
- Grace Moore, opera soprano
- Shelly Moore, Miss Teen USA 1997
- Craig Morgan, singer
- Lorrie Morgan, singer
- Bryan Morris, baseball player
- Gideon Morris, trans-Appalachian pioneer and founder of Morristown
- Ricky Morton, professional wrestler
- Anson Mount, writer
- James Cole Mountflorence, 19th-century diplomat
- Mary Noailles Murfree, author
- Robert Myers, football player

== N ==
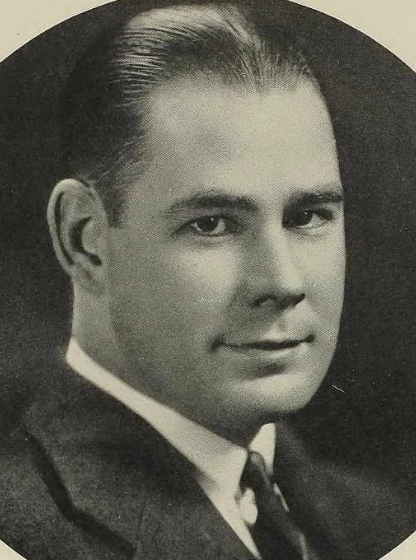
Robert Neyland

- Elise Neal, actress
- Patricia Neal, Academy Award-winning actress
- Lindsey Nelson, sportscaster
- Johnny Neumann, basketball player
- Josef Newgarden, Indy Car driver
- Robert Neyland, UT Vols football coach, namesake for Neyland Stadium
- Alfred O. P. Nicholson, politician
- Bishop James Daniel Niedergeses, clergyman
- Kenneth Nixon, musician

== O ==
- Adolph Ochs, publisher
- Oconostota
- Joe O'Donnell, photojournalist
- Michael Oher, football player
- Joe Oliver, baseball player
- Frank Omiyale, football player
- Randall Keith Orton, professional wrestler
- Claude Osteen, baseball pitcher
- Jimmy Outlaw, baseball player
- Park Overall, actress
- Chord Overstreet, actor, singer
- Major Owens, politician

== P ==
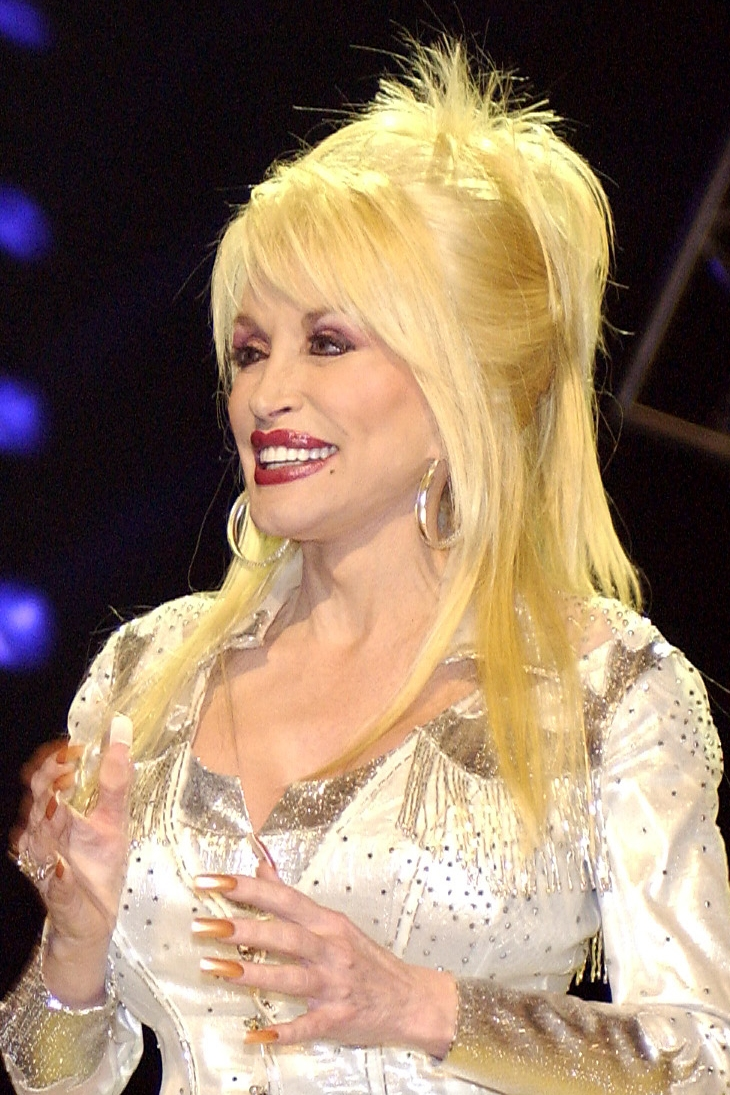
Dolly Parton

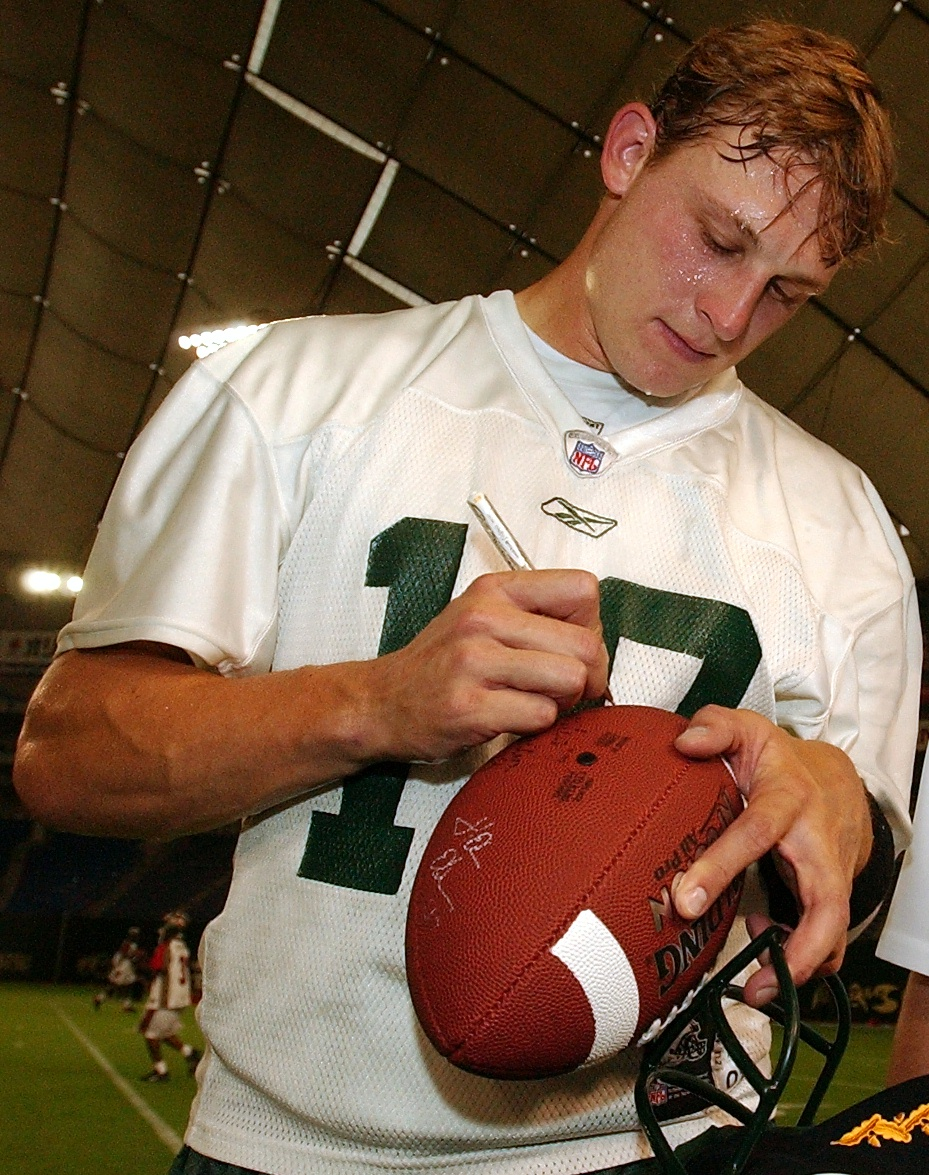
Chad Pennington

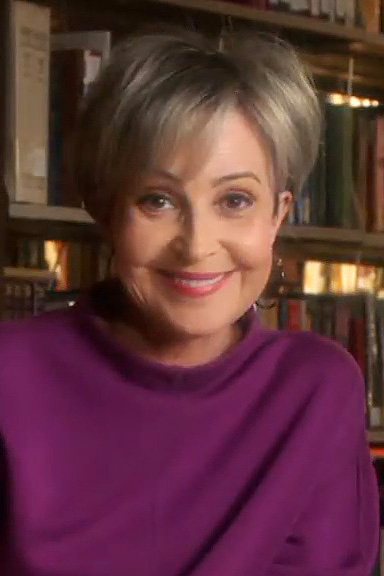
Annie Potts

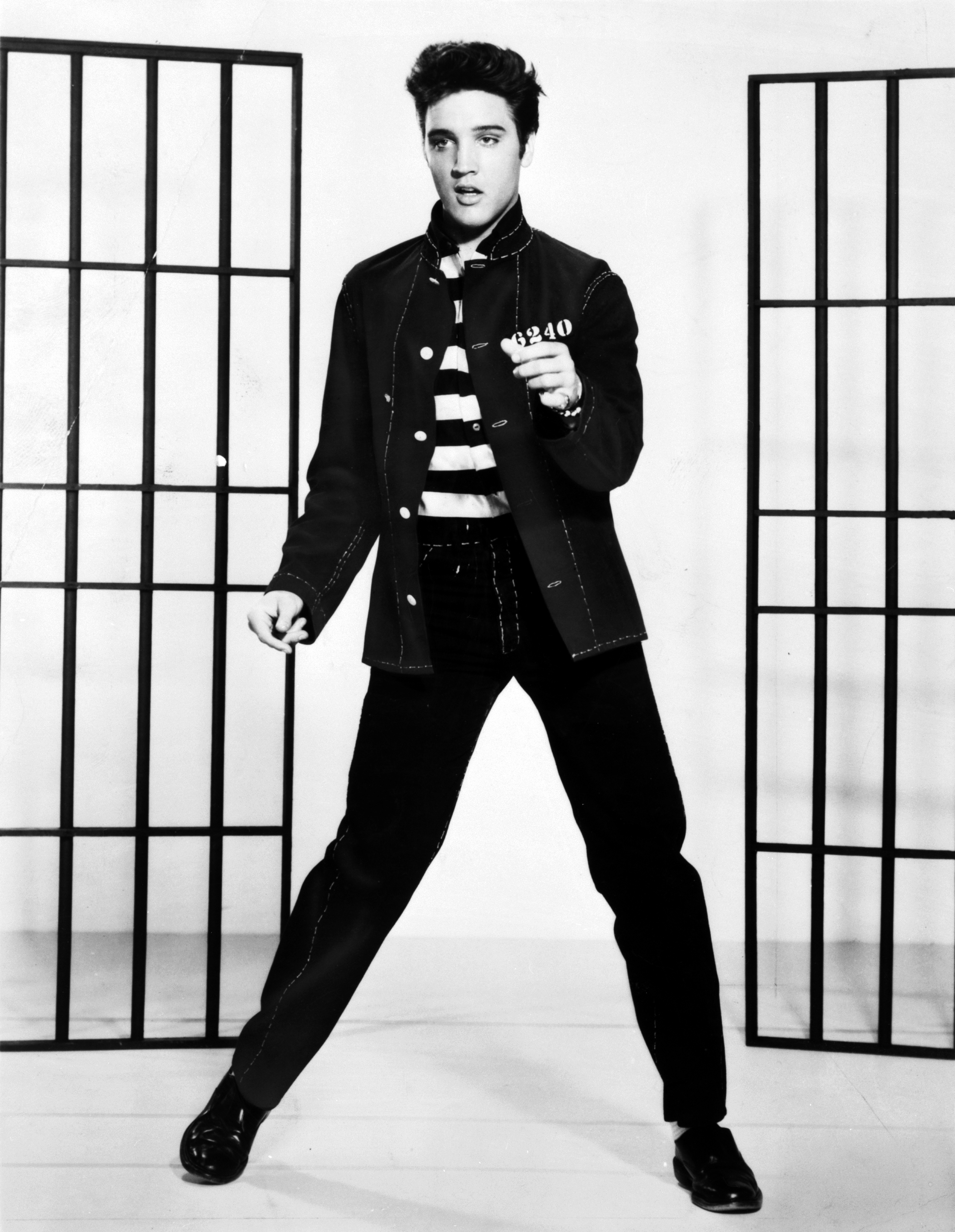
Elvis Presley

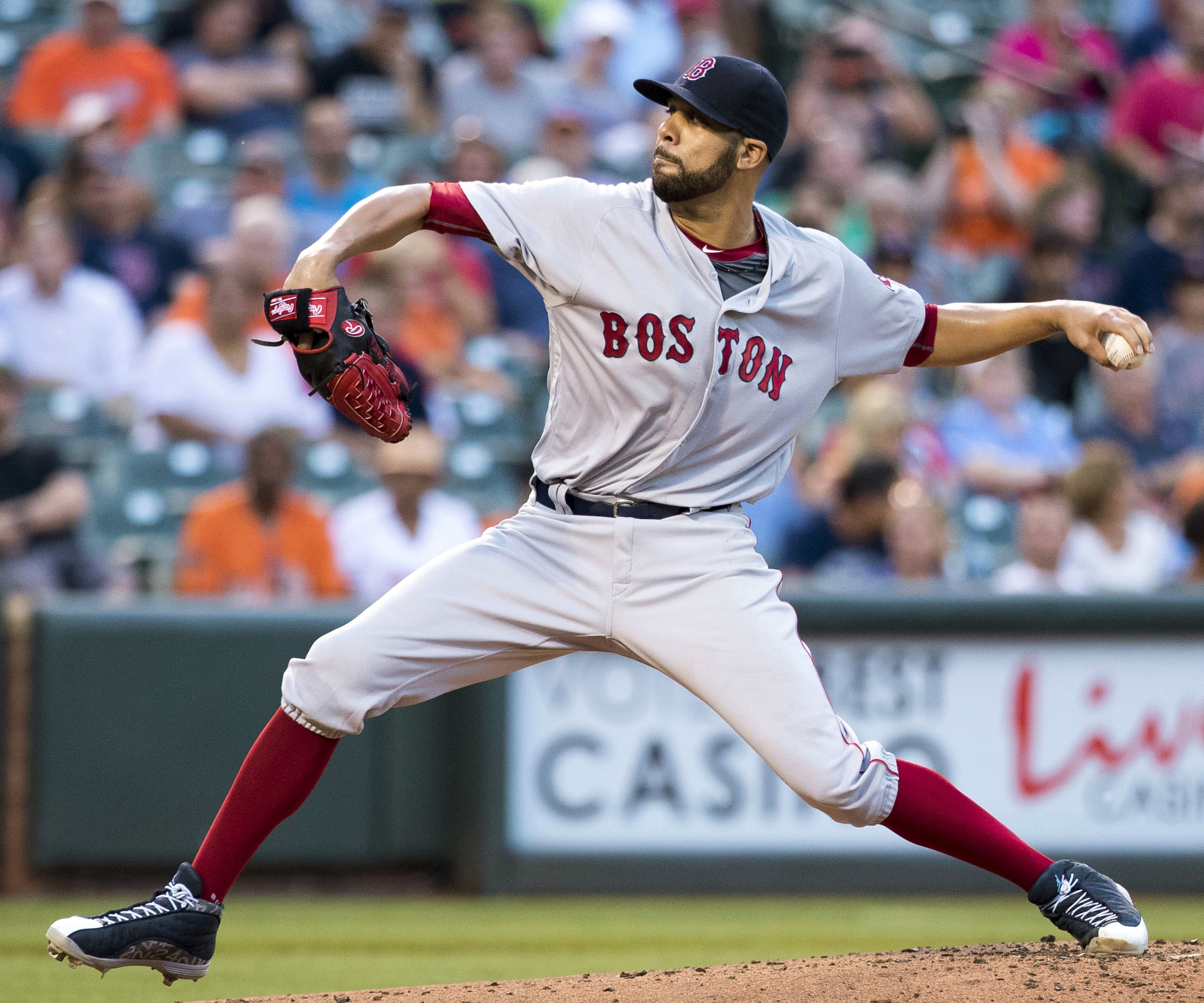
David Price

- Bettie Page, model
- John Palmer, television journalist
- Matt Palmer, baseball pitcher
- Hermes Pan, choreographer
- Paramore, four members from Franklin
- Lara Parker, actress
- Cindy Parlow, soccer player and coach
- Chris Parnell, comedian
- Wes Parsons, baseball pitcher
- Hope Partlow, singer
- Dolly Parton, singer and actress
- Randy Parton, singer
- Stella Parton, actress
- Elizabeth Patterson, actress
- Quinton Patton, NFL player
- Cameron Payne, NBA player
- Waylon Payne, singer
- Minnie Pearl, comedian and Grand Ole Opry star
- Puggy Pearson, professional poker player
- Chad Pennington, NFL player
- Sydney Penny, actress
- Carl Perkins, musician
- Michael Peterson, novelist, criminal
- John J. Pettus, 23rd governor of Mississippi (1859–1863)
- John M. Pickard, actor
- Landon Pigg, singer
- Vada Pinson, baseball player
- Dontari Poe, NFL player
- Antoinette Van Leer Polk, southern belle and Baroness de Charette
- James K. Polk, 11th President of the United States (1845–1849)
- Leonidas Polk, bishop
- VanLeer Polk, politician
- Sarah Childress Polk, First Lady of the United States, wife of President James K. Polk
- Drew Pomeranz, baseball pitcher
- James D. Porter, governor
- Annie Potts, actress
- Casey Prather (born 1991), basketball player in the Israeli Basketball Premier League
- Elvis Presley, "king of rock and roll", actor
- David Price, baseball pitcher
- Tommy Prothro, football coach
- Will Provine, historian of science
- Missi Pyle, actress and singer

== Q ==
- DJ Qualls, actor
- Jimmy Quillen, politician

== R ==
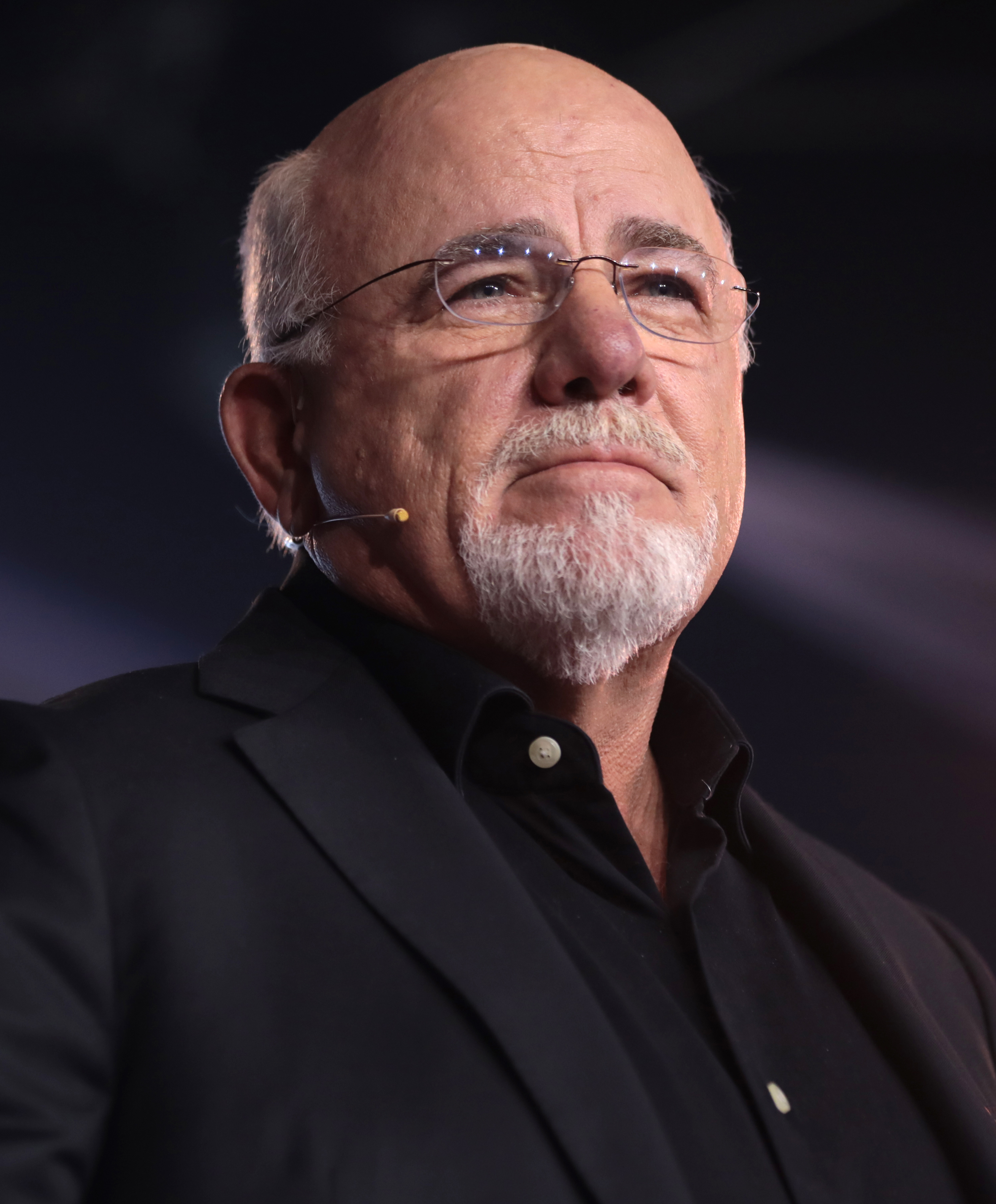
Dave Ramsey

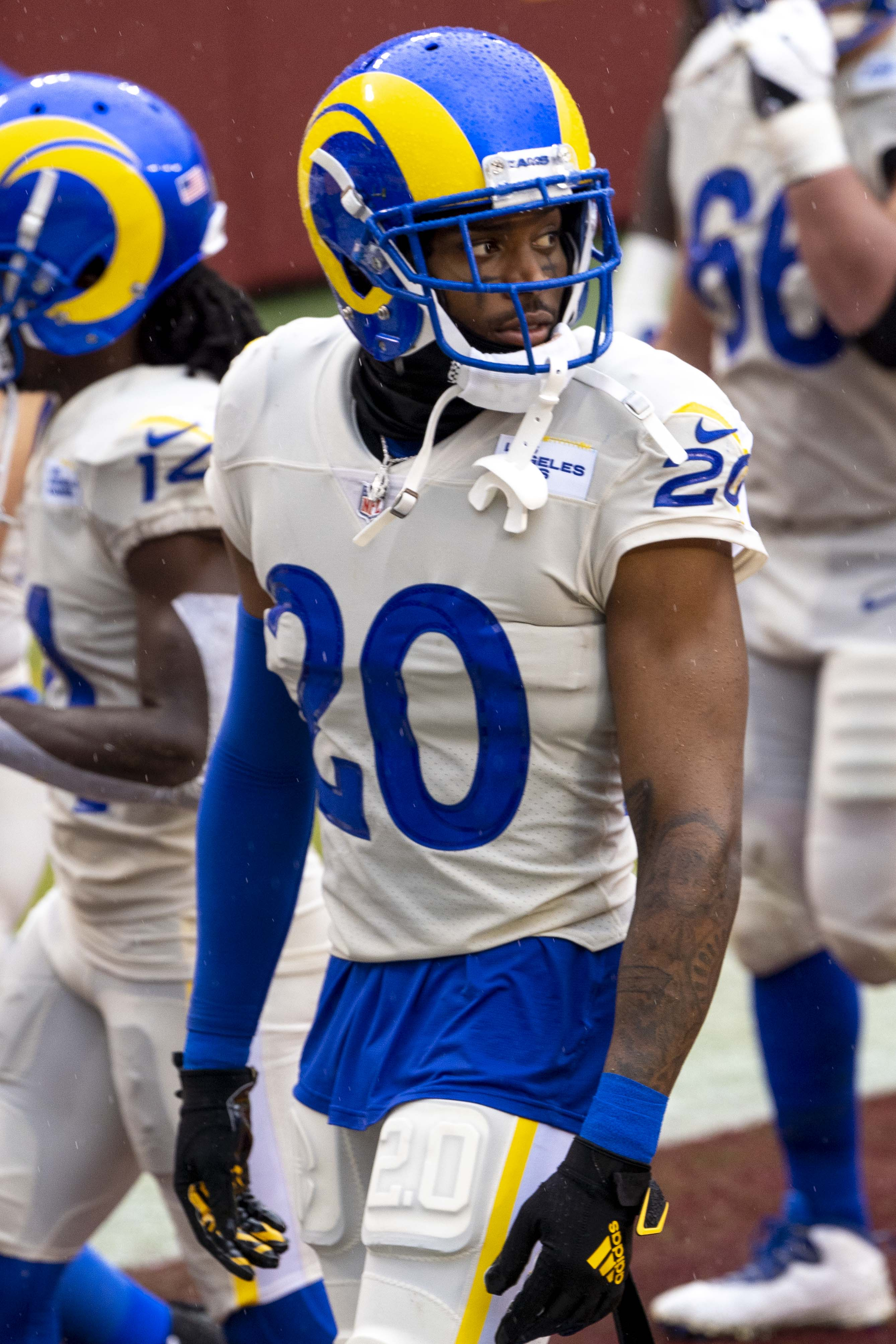
Jalen Ramsey

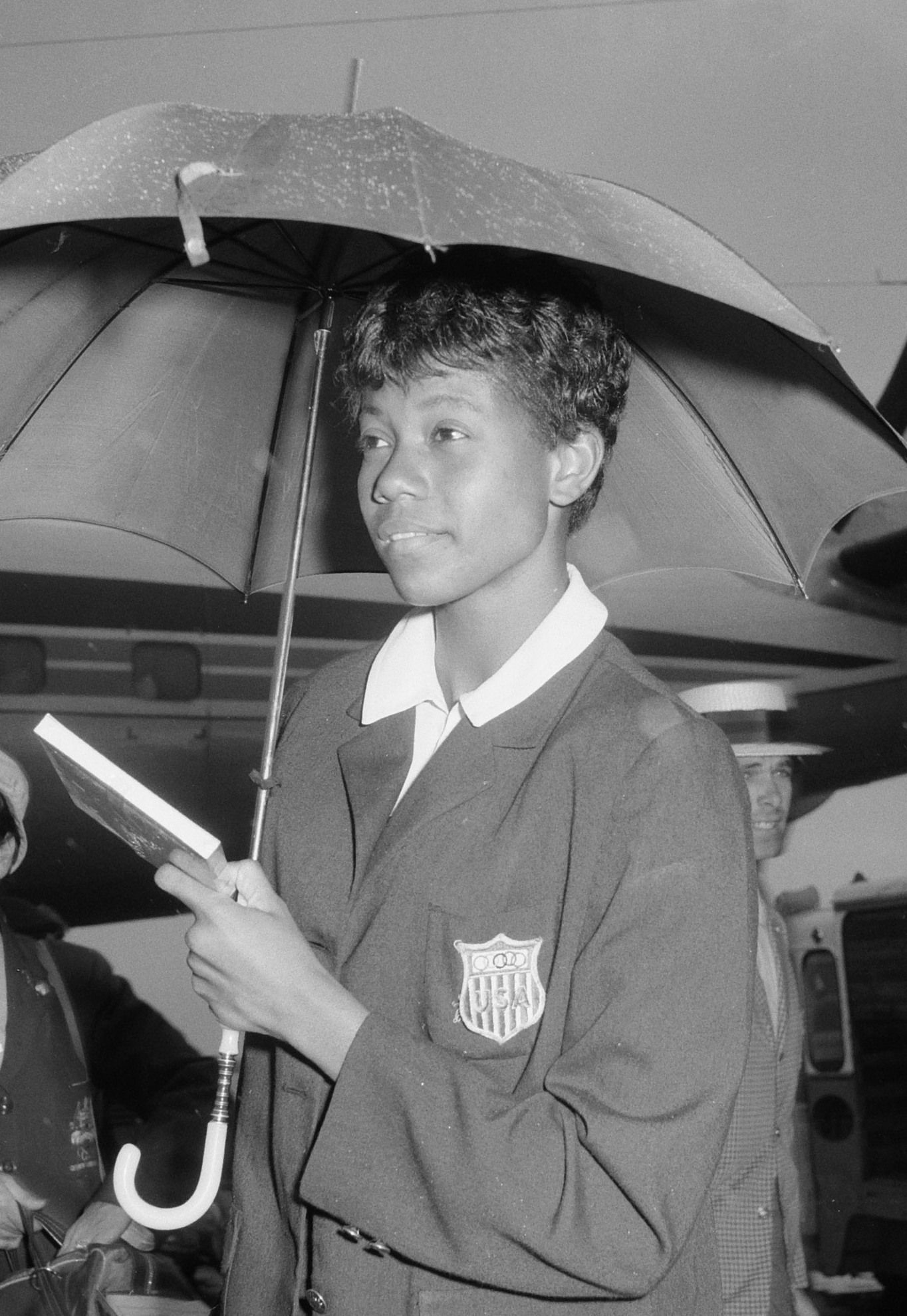
Wilma Rudolph

- Dave Ramsey, author, motivational speaker
- Jalen Ramsey, football player
- John Rankin, abolitionist
- John Crow Ransom, educator and critic
- Isaiah Rashad, rapper and songwriter
- Wallace Rasmussen, businessman and philanthropist
- Wendell Rawls Jr., journalist
- Robbie Ray, baseball player
- Sam Rayburn, politician
- J. J. Redick, basketball player
- B. Carroll Reece
- Florence Patton Reece, folk singer
- Kennedy J. Reed, theoretical atomic physicist
- Jerry Reese, football executive
- Brad Renfro, actor
- Garrett Reynolds, football player
- Cynthia Rhodes, actress, singer
- Grantland Rice, sportswriter
- Herb Rich (1928–2008), 2x All-Pro NFL football player
- John S. Roane, 4th governor of Arkansas (1849–1852)
- Lee Roberson, educator
- Rick Roberson, basketball player
- Albert H. Roberts, governor
- James Robertson, explorer
- Oscar Robertson, basketball player
- Pat Robertson, televangelist
- Olan Rogers, comedian, actor
- John Ross, Cherokee chief
- Mitch Rouse, actor and director
- Vic Rouse, basketball player
- Mason Rudolph, golfer
- Wilma Rudolph, athlete, Olympic gold medalist
- Dalton Rushing, baseball player
- Campy Russell, basketball player
- Fred Russell, sportswriter
- Thomas Clarke Rye, governor

== S ==
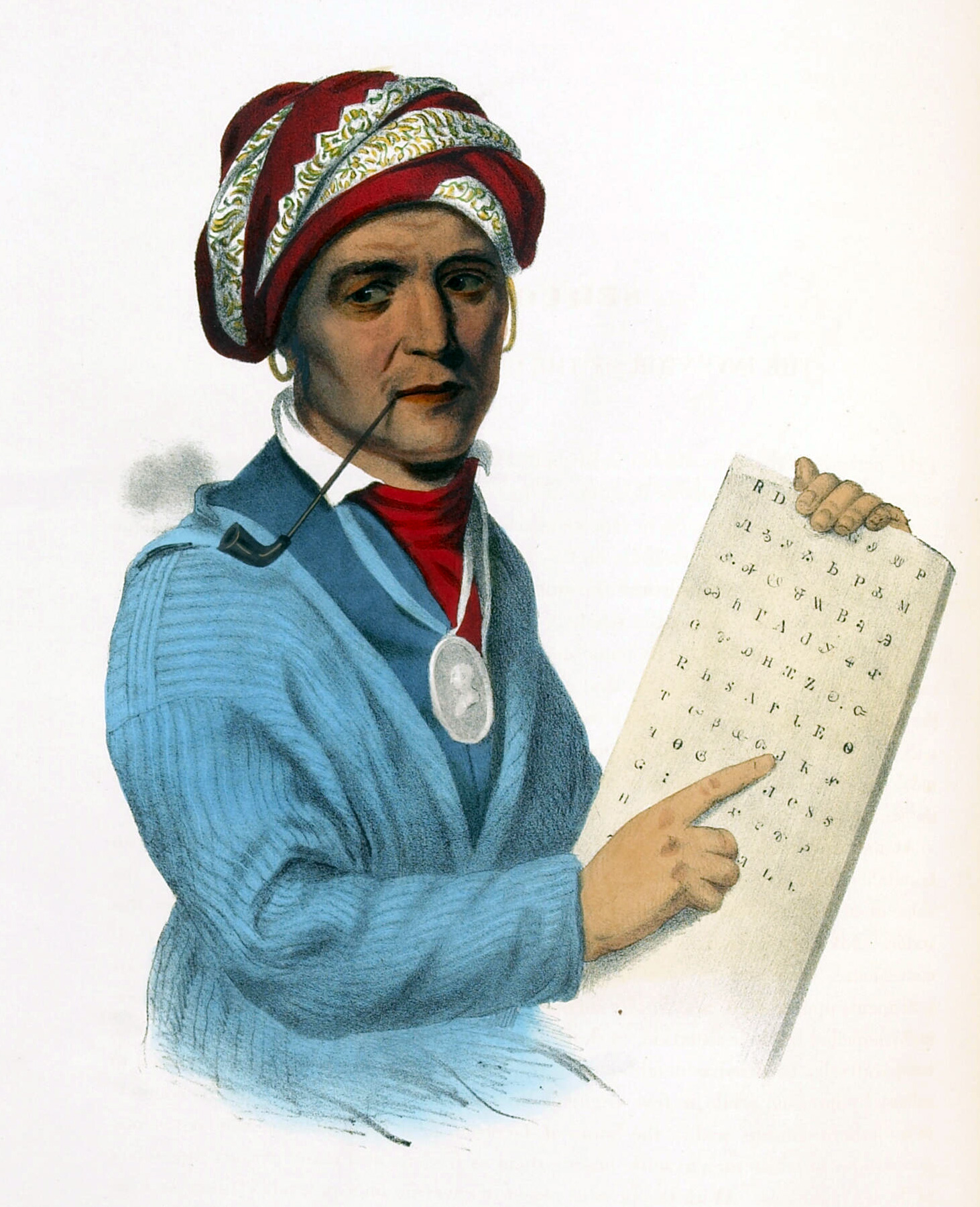
Sequoyah

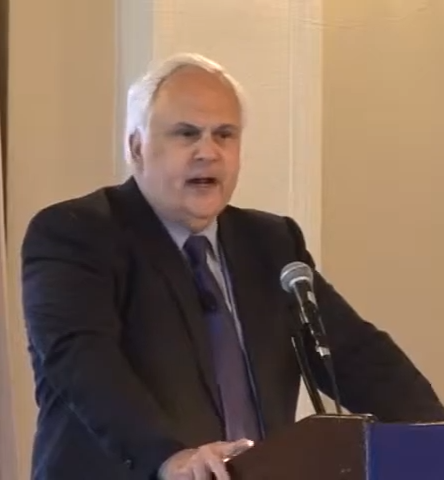
Frederick W. Smith

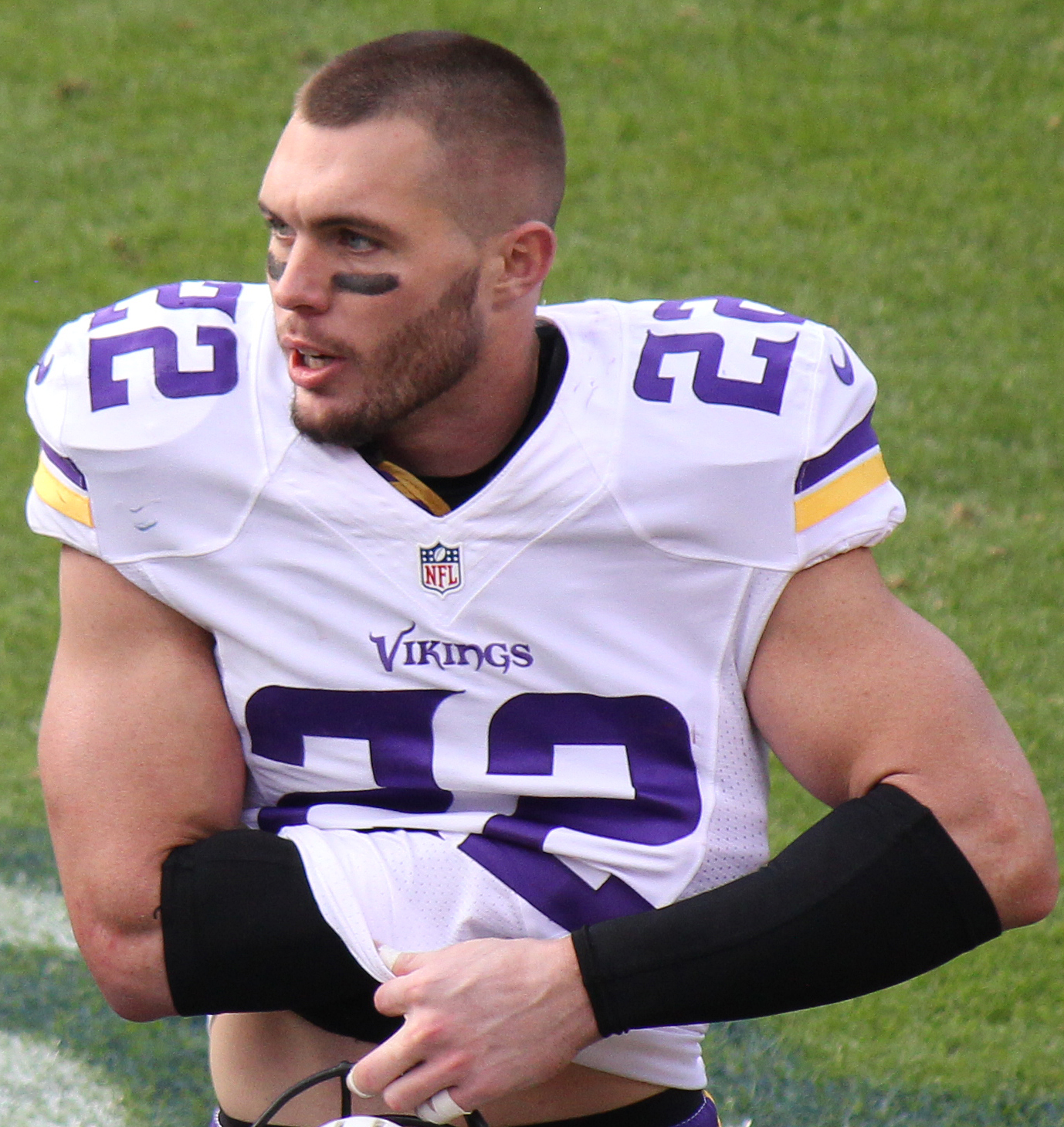
Harrison Smith

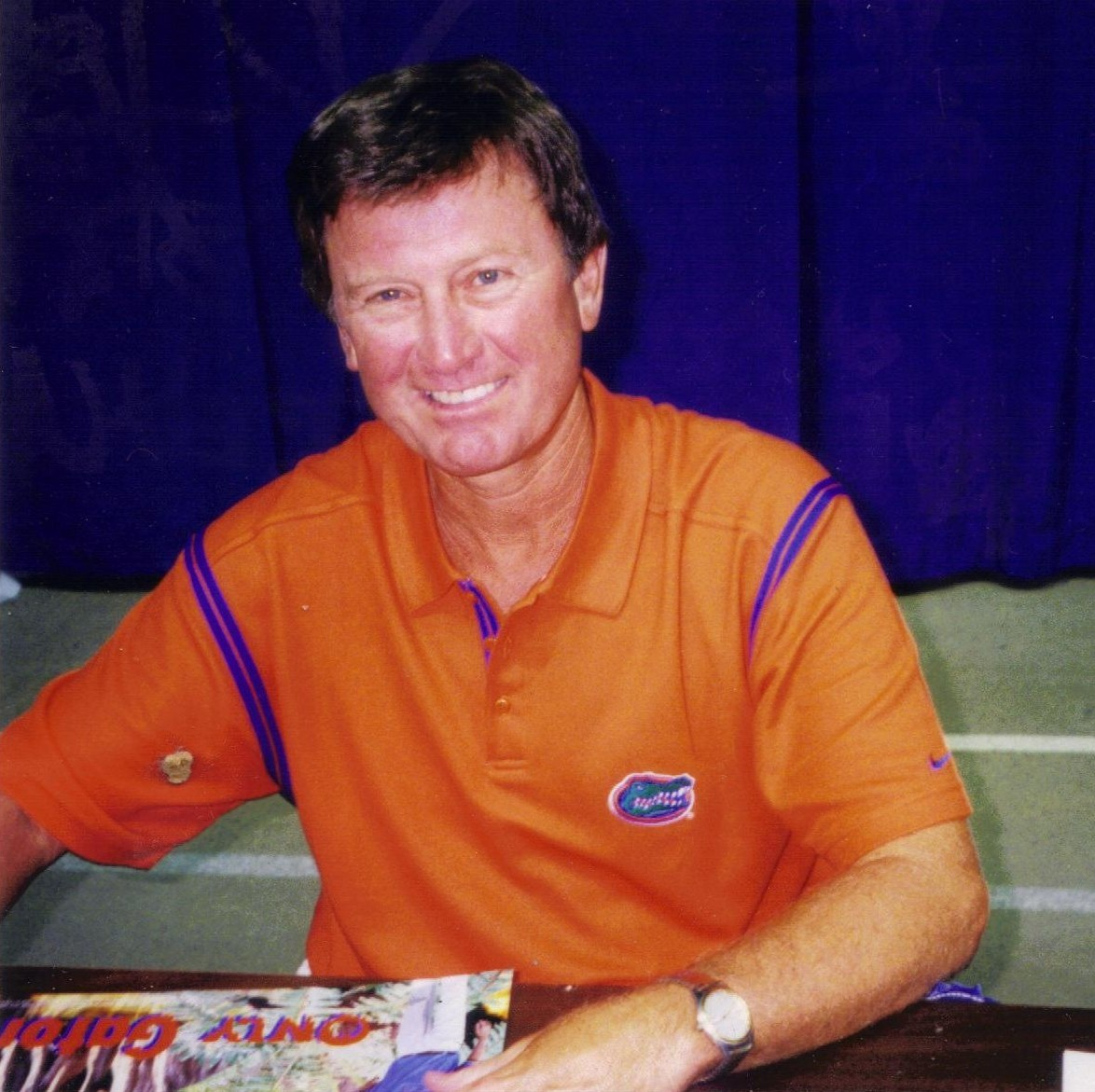
Steve Spurrier

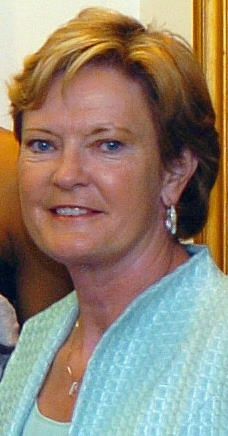
Pat Summitt

- Christine Sadler, journalist
- Shane Salerno, screenwriter
- Chip Saltsman, politician
- William Sanderson, actor, Newhart, Deadwood, True Blood
- Paul Satterfield, actor
- Clarence Saunders, grocer
- Dan Schneider, television producer
- Aaron Schoenfeld (born 1990), Major League Soccer player
- Tom Schulman, screenwriter
- John T. Scopes, schoolteacher
- Alvin Scott, basketball player
- Hillary Scott, lead singer of Lady Antebellum
- Josey Scott, lead singer of Saliva
- Rhea Seddon, astronaut
- John Seigenthaler, television journalist
- John Michael Seigenthaler, television journalist
- Gerald Sensabaugh, football player
- Dewitt Clinton Senter, governor
- Sequoyah, polymath of the Cherokee Nation
- John Sevier, one of Tennessee's founding fathers
- Paul Shanklin, satirist
- Vicellous Reon Shannon, actor, The Hurricane, 24 Season 1
- Ben Shapiro, political commentator
- Cybill Shepherd, actress
- William Shepherd, astronaut
- T. G. Sheppard, singer
- George Sherrill, baseball pitcher
- John K. Shields, U.S. senator
- Pooh Shiesty, rapper
- Dinah Shore, singer, actress and television personality
- Daniel Simberloff, biologist
- Walt Simonson, comic book writer/artist
- Benjamin "Pap" Singleton, activist
- Jonathan Singleton, singer-songwriter
- Bessie Smith, singer
- Bingo Smith, basketball player
- Brent Smith, lead singer of Shinedown
- Carl Smith, singer
- Daniel Smith, surveyor
- Frederick W. Smith (1944–2025), businessman
- Harrison Smith, football player
- Lane Smith, actor
- Lee Smith, football player
- Rachel Smith, Miss USA 2007
- Bobby Sowell (born 1947), musician, songwriter
- Cailee Spaeny, actress
- Richard Speight Jr., actor
- Steve Spurrier, football coach
- Bethany Stahl, author
- Elizabeth Tipton Stanley, educator, reformer, and suffragist
- Edwin Starr, singer
- Alfred Steele, CEO of PepsiCo
- Lewie Steinberg (1933–2016), bassist
- Ricky Stenhouse Jr., NASCAR driver
- Andrew Stevens, actor and producer
- Morgan Stevens, actor
- Jim Stewart (1930–2022), record producer and co-founder of Stax Records
- Tom Stewart, U.S. senator
- James Stone, football player
- John M. Stone, politician
- Tyler Stone (born 1991), basketball player in the Israeli Basketball Premier League
- Harry Stonecipher, aviation executive
- Thomas S. Stribling, writer
- Samuel Stritch, archbishop
- Pat Summitt, basketball coach
- Frank Sutton, actor
- Grady Sutton, actor
- Lynn Swann, football player
- Austin Swift, actor, brother of Taylor Swift
- Taylor Swift, singer-songwriter and record producer

== T ==
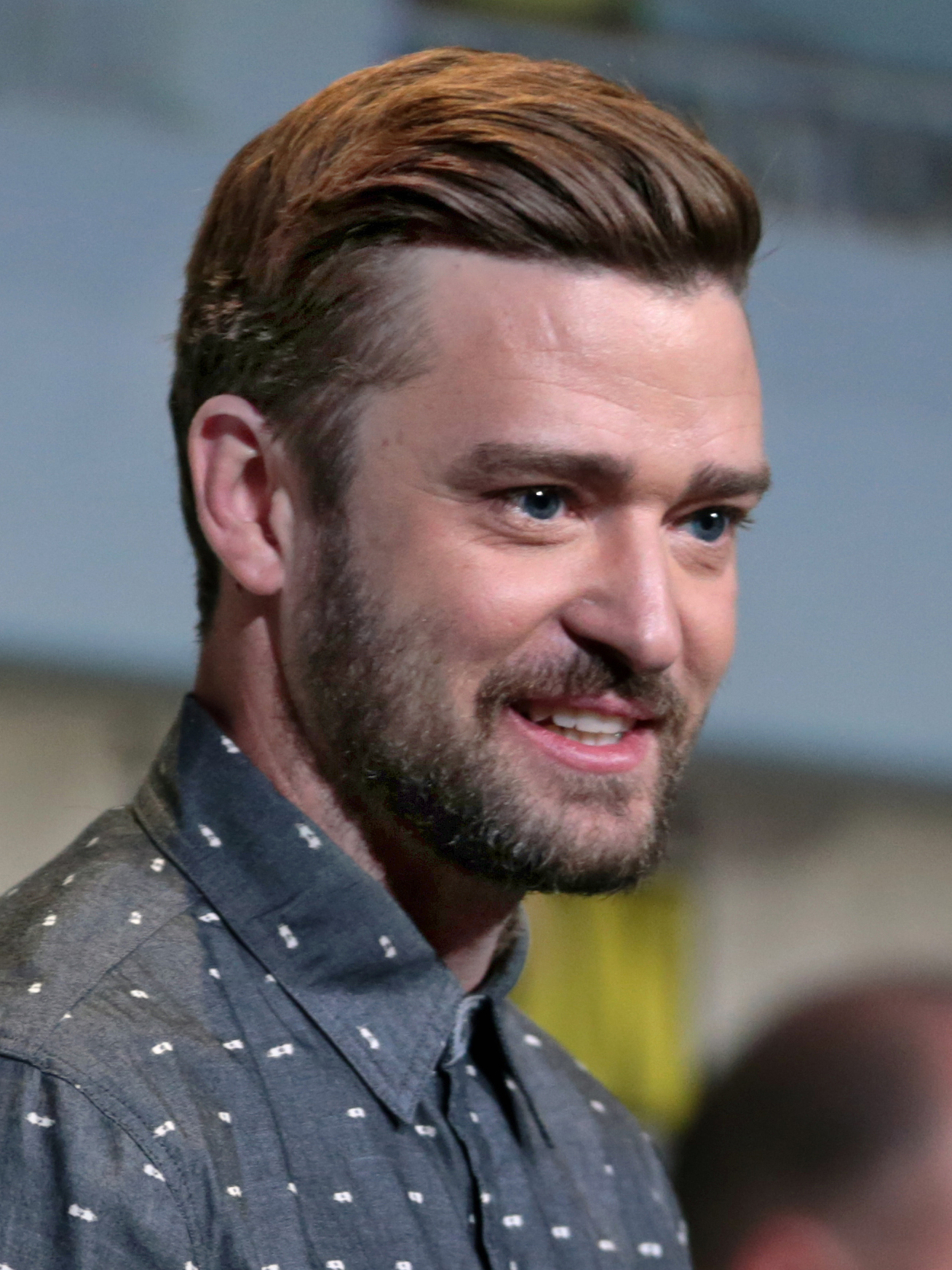
Justin Timberlake

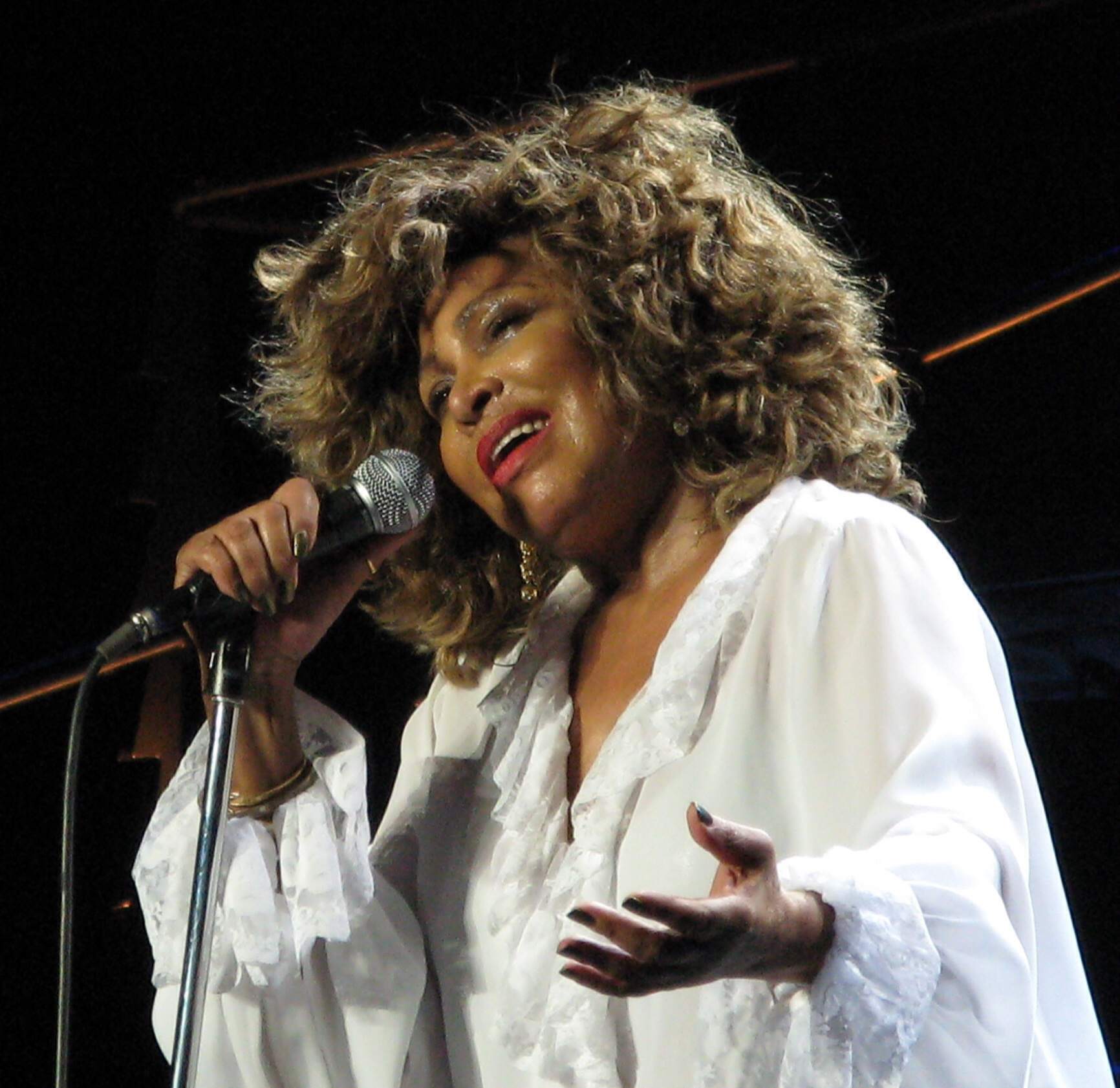
Tina Turner

- George Taliaferro, football player
- Edward Talley, soldier; Medal of Honor recipient
- Roscoe Tanner, tennis player
- James Tappan (1825–1906), politician, lawyer, and Confederate general; born in Franklin
- Quentin Tarantino, film director, actor, and screenwriter; born in Knoxville
- Allen Tate, poet
- Golden Tate, football player
- Alfred A. Taylor, governor
- Jordan Taylor, YouTuber
- Peter Taylor, author
- Robert Love Taylor, governor and U.S. senator
- Adonis Thomas (born 1993), basketball player in the Israeli Basketball Premier League
- Carla Thomas (born 1942), singer, dubbed "the Queen of Memphis Soul"
- J. Karen Thomas, actress, singer
- Jake Thomas, actor
- Lane Thomas, baseball player
- Hugh F. Thomason (1826–1893), politician; born in Smith County
- Fred Dalton Thompson, politician and actor
- Three 6 Mafia
- Faye Throneberry, baseball player
- Marv Throneberry, baseball player
- Isaac Tigrett, businessman, founder of Hard Rock Cafe
- Justin Timberlake, singer and actor
- Mageina Tovah, actress; Joan of Arcadia, the Spider-Man films
- Andrew Triggs, baseball player
- Cal Turner, co-founder of Dollar General
- Elston Turner, basketball player
- James Luther Turner, co-founder of Dollar General
- Ted Turner, founder of CNN and TBS, former owner of Atlanta Braves, Atlanta Hawks, and Atlanta Thrashers
- Tina Turner, singer
- Peter Turney, governor

== U ==
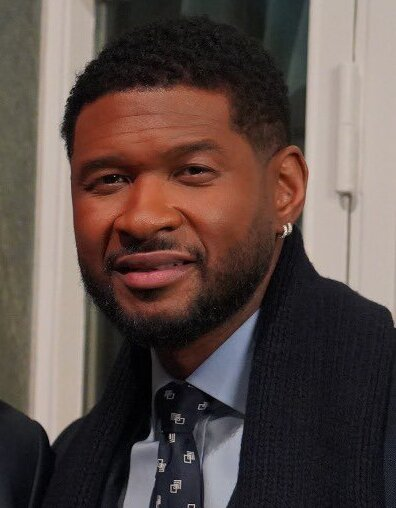
Usher

- Ryan Upchurch, country music songwriter and rapper
- Reggie Upshaw (born 1995), basketball player in the Israel Basketball Premier League
- Usher, entertainer

== V ==
- Anthony Wayne Van Leer, iron works owner
- Gore Verbinski, actor and director
- Lark Voorhies, actress

== W ==
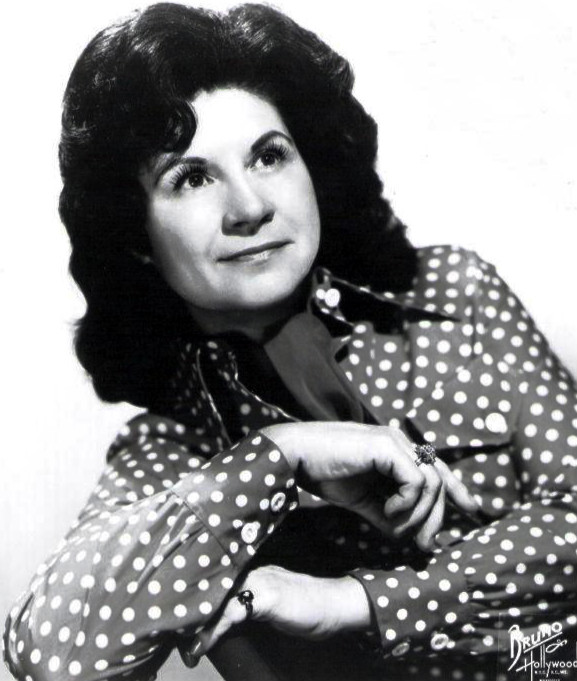
Kitty Wells

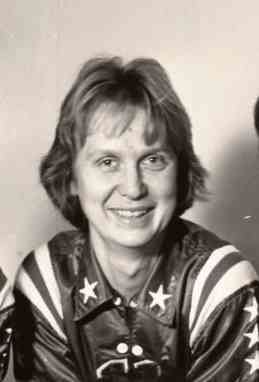
Nera White

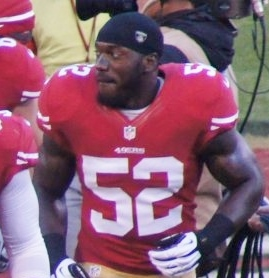
Patrick Willis

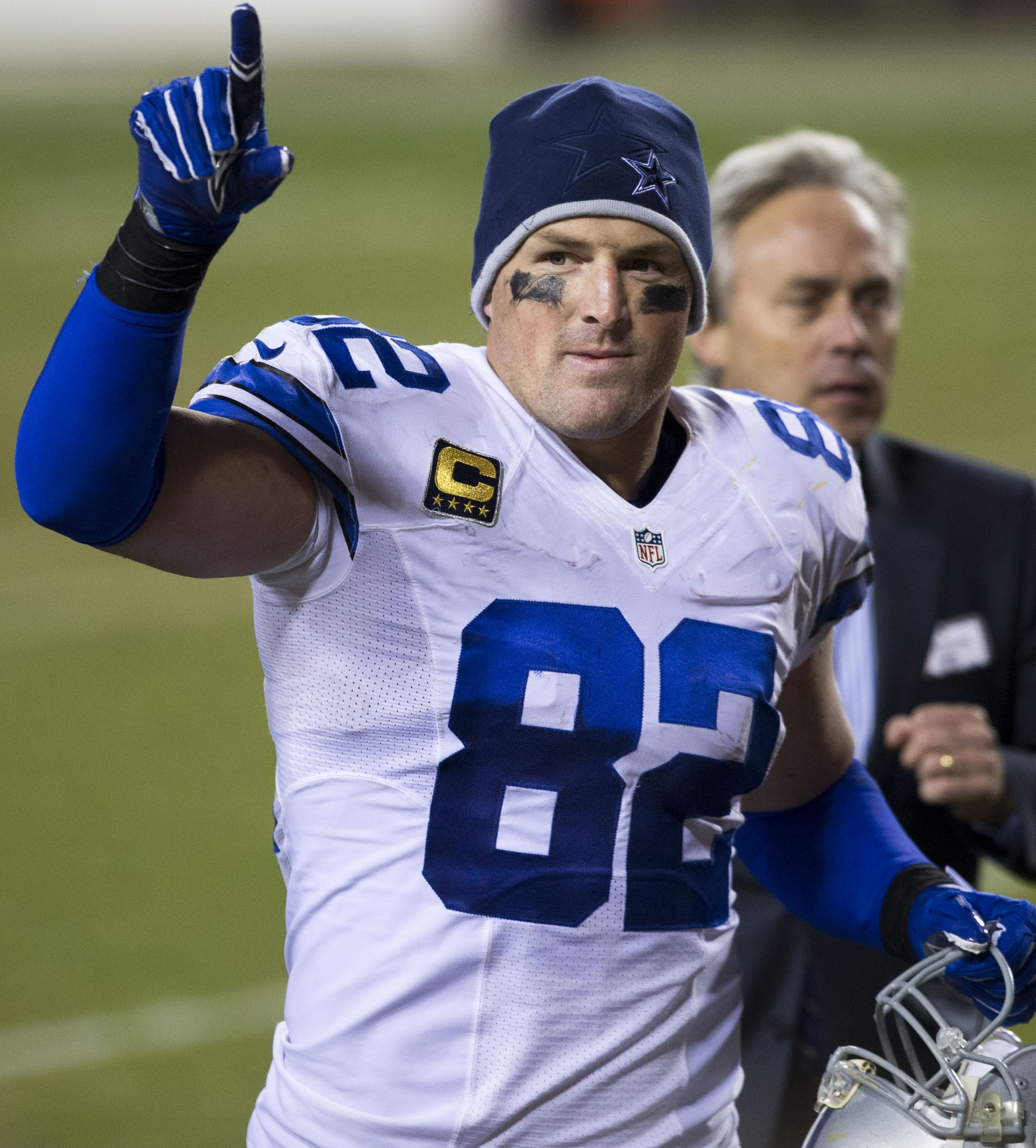
Jason Witten

- Bill Wade, football player
- Chuck Wagner, actor
- Leon Wagner, baseball player
- Barbara Jo Walker, Miss America 1947
- William Walker, lawyer, journalist
- Randall Wallace, screenwriter and director
- Gretchen Walsh, swimmer
- Herbert S. Walters, U.S. senator
- Darrell Waltrip, auto racer, winner of 1989 Daytona 500
- Calvin Ward, soldier; Medal of Honor recipient
- Koko B. Ware, professional wrestler
- Mary Ware, poet and writer
- Taylor Ware, singer
- William W. Watkins (1826–1898), politician; born in Jefferson County
- Cameron Watson, actor and director
- Robert Penn Warren, author
- David Weathers, baseball pitcher
- Lucy Webb, comedian
- Minnie Welch, reformer
- Ida B. Wells, journalist (originally from Mississippi)
- Kitty Wells, singer
- Scott Wells, football player
- David West, baseball pitcher
- Red West, stuntman, actor, associate of Elvis Presley
- James Westerfield, actor
- Kent Whitaker, culinary writer, chef (born in Kentucky, raised in Nashville)
- Hugh Lawson White, politician
- Nera White, basketball player
- Reggie White, football player, Hall of Famer
- Ed Whitson, baseball pitcher
- John S. Wilder, politician
- Snootie Wild, rapper
- Dan Williams, football player
- Elliot Williams, basketball player
- Hank Williams III, singer
- Hayley Williams, singer for Paramore (originally from Mississippi)
- Louis Williams, basketball player
- Shawne Williams, basketball player
- Sonny Boy Williamson, blues musician
- Patrick Willis, football player
- Cedrick Wilson, football player
- E. Bright Wilson, chemist
- Oprah Winfrey, talk show host, actress, producer (originally from Mississippi)
- Don Wise, saxophonist, music producer, songwriter
- Tim Wise, activist
- Reese Witherspoon, Academy Award-winning actress
- Jason Witten, football player, Dallas Cowboys
- Brandan Wright, basketball player
- Clyde Wright, baseball pitcher
- K. J. Wright, football player

== Y ==
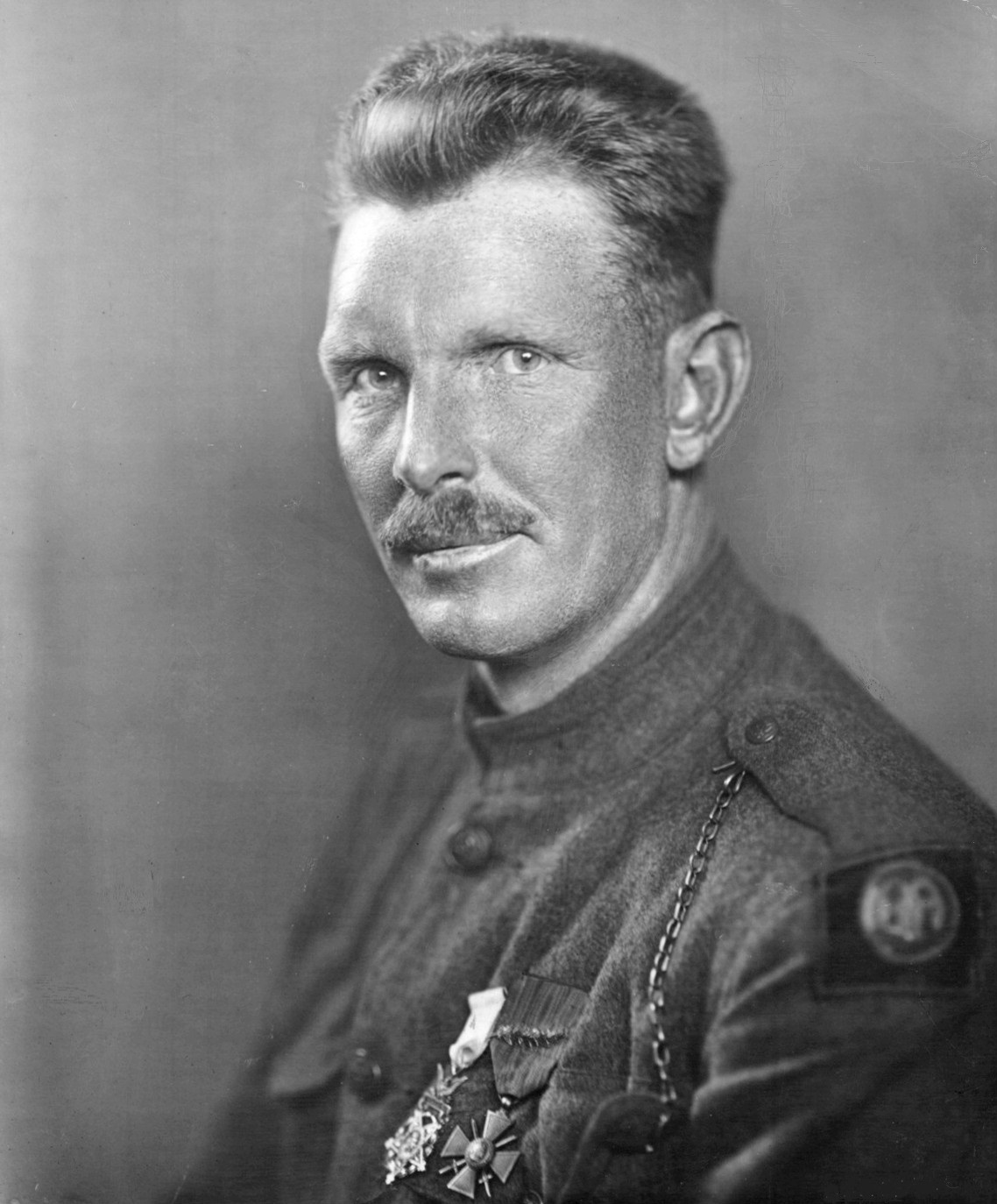
Alvin York

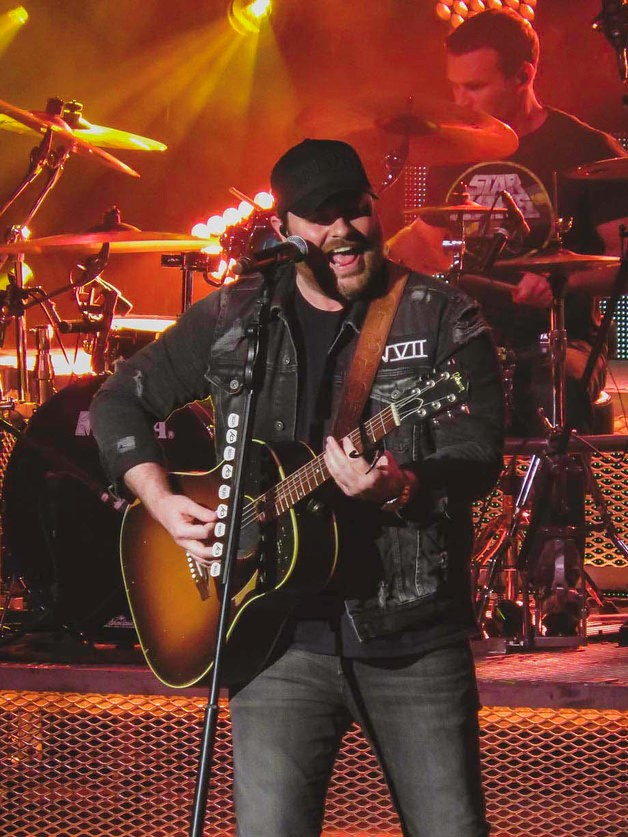
Chris Young

- Susan Yeagley, actress
- Moneybagg Yo, rapper
- Alvin York, World War I soldier who captured 132 Germans almost single-handedly, Sergeant York
- Taylor York, guitarist
- Bob Young, TV producer
- Young Buck, rapper
- Chris Young, singer, winner of Nashville Star
- Thaddeus Young, basketball player

== Z ==
- Chris Zachary, baseball player
- Felix Zollicoffer, American Civil War general, congressman

== See also ==
- List of Tennessee suffragists

By educational institution affiliation

- List of Baylor School alumni
- List of leaders of the University of Tennessee at Chattanooga
- List of Sewanee: The University of the South people
- List of Tennessee State University presidents
- List of University of Memphis people
- List of University of Tennessee people
- List of Vanderbilt University people

By governmental office

- List of governors of Tennessee
- List of justices of the Tennessee Supreme Court
- List of lieutenant governors of Tennessee
- List of speakers of the Tennessee House of Representatives
- List of United States senators from Tennessee
- List of United States representatives from Tennessee

By location

- List of people from Chattanooga, Tennessee
- List of people from Knoxville, Tennessee
- List of people from Memphis, Tennessee
- List of people from Nashville, Tennessee
