= Thomas Bartlett Whitaker =

American convicted murderer (born 1979)

- Born: December 31, 1979 (age 46); Houston, Texas, U.S.
- Other names: Rudy Rios, Bart
- Parent(s): Kent Whitaker, Tricia Whitaker
- Status: Incarcerated
- Motive: Monetary gain
- Conviction: Capital murder (2 counts)
- Penalty: Death; commuted to life imprisonment without the possibility of parole
- Accomplices: Steven Champagne, Chris Brashear

Details
- Date: December 10, 2003
- Location: Sugar Land, Texas
- Killed: 2 (Note: Patricia Whitaker, age 51; Kevin Whitaker, age 19)
- Injured: 2 (including self) (Note: Kent Whitaker, age 52)
- Date apprehended: September 25, 2005

Thomas Bartlett Whitaker (born December 31, 1979) is an American convicted under the Texas law of parties of murdering two family members as a 23-year-old. Whitaker was convicted and sentenced to death in March 2007 for the December 10, 2003, murders of his mother and 19-year-old brother. He spent years on death row at the Polunsky Unit near Livingston, Texas, before the commutation of his death sentence.

Whitaker's father, whom Whitaker had also attempted to have murdered, had pleaded with Governor Greg Abbott for the commutation of Whitaker's sentence, stating that by executing his son, the state was simply making him a victim once again. On February 22, 2018, about 40 minutes before his scheduled 6:00 pm execution, Whitaker had his death sentence commuted to life imprisonment without the possibility of parole by Abbott, the first such commutation by Abbott and the first in the state since 2007, in which Governor Rick Perry commuted Kenneth Foster's death sentence. As of September 2021, Whitaker is incarcerated at the McConnell Unit near Beeville, Texas.

== Early life and education ==
Thomas Bartlett "Bart" Whitaker was born on December 31, 1979, to father Kent, the comptroller of a construction company, and mother Patricia (Trish), an elementary school teacher.

Whitaker attended Clements High School, where in 1997 as a 17-year-old, he received a criminal conviction for a series of seven burglaries that he had "meticulous[ly]" planned, leading other young friends in the spree. In that same time frame, Whitaker's parents had bought him several luxury vehicles. Whitaker began attending Baylor University in 2001, transferring from there to Sam Houston State University (SHSU), where he was thought by his parents to be in attendance in late 2003, and from which he was expected to graduate. He had lied to his parents about his continued status in college; varying reports had him dropping out of SHSU months before, or being present there as a freshman on academic probation. His parents funded his academic pursuits. In addition, they purchased a lakeside townhouse in Willis, Texas, for his use, and a $4,000 Rolex watch was given to him as a college graduation present hours before the murders.

== Murders ==
On December 10, 2003, Bart falsely told his family that he was graduating from SHSU. The family drove to the nearby Pappadeaux restaurant in Stafford for a celebratory dinner. Whitaker had enlisted two individuals to carry out the shootings: Chris Brashear, shooter, and Steven Champagne, Brashear's getaway driver. Brashear, dressed in black (including a ski mask), entered the Whitaker family home, took Bart's brother Kevin's gun and ammunition from a locked box in his room, staged a burglary, and then waited near the front door for the Whitaker family to return home.

Upon returning home but before entering the house, Bart said that he needed to collect his cell phone from his parked Yukon, knowing that Brashear was armed and waiting inside to kill his family. Kevin entered the family home first and reportedly smiled when he saw the masked Brashear. Brashear shot Kevin once through his chest, and Kevin fell to the floor. Patricia was then also shot in the chest, also falling to the floor. Kent rushed in and was shot in the shoulder with the bullet shattering his humerus. Bart then ran inside and staged a struggle with Brashear, getting shot in his left arm to divert suspicion.

Brashear then exited through the Whitakers' back door and jumped over the fence into the rear neighbor's yard. The Whitakers' neighbor, Cliff Stanley, was the first person to arrive on the scene. He could see that Kevin was dead, but Patricia was still alive. Patricia died shortly after the start of her airlift by Life Flight to Memorial Hermann Hospital; Bart's father Kent survived. Bart told first responders that he thought the gunman was black, in order to divert suspicion away from Brashear.

== Investigation and arrest ==
Whitaker left for Mexico in June 2004. He told his father he was going to a club and never returned. Using $3,000 to persuade an acquaintance to assist him, he assumed the name "Rudy Rios" and found work in a furniture shop in Cerralvo, Mexico. There, he developed a relationship with a woman and concocted a story of service in Afghanistan to explain his gunshot wound. He lived there under the false name for over a year. On September 15, 2005, a capital murder warrant was issued against Whitaker. The acquaintance who had assisted Whitaker to flee became aware of reward money that had been offered for his arrest, and communicated Whitaker's whereabouts to the police.

Cooperating with US authorities, Mexican authorities arrested Whitaker without incident under immigration charges. In September 2005, Whitaker was handed over to U.S. authorities at the border town of Laredo, Texas, where he was arrested for capital murder.

== Trial and conviction ==
Whitaker was refused a plea bargain in exchange for his admission of guilt by District Attorney John Healey, and was instead tried for capital murder. The trial began in March 2007, led by prosecutor Fred Felcman (Note: Fred Felcman, the original prosecutor in the case, said the board made its decision purely because of the father’s forgiveness, and disregarded the large number of others affected by the murders. He said testimony from psychiatrists and the family’s investigators who [had stated that] Bart was manipulative was disregarded.) before 400th District Court Judge Clifford Vacek and a Fort Bend County jury. Evidence was presented that Whitaker had recruited two individuals, Steve Champagne and Chris Brashear, ages 24 and 25 at the time of the 2007 trial respectively, Champagne to be the getaway car driver and Brashear to carry out the shootings in Whitaker's plan to murder his immediate family.

Early evidence was presented that Whitaker had previously recruited others in abortive plots to murder his family, including an acquaintance named Adam Hipp, who had attended Clements High School with Whitaker. At the trial, Hipp stated that he had contacted the Sugar Land Police Department with information about previous plots after he heard about the Whitaker family murders in 2003; he was given immunity from prosecution in exchange for testifying for the prosecution against Whitaker.

The early testimony from Hipp described a first Whitaker plan to set a lake house owned by his grandmother on fire "to kill his parents, brother and other relatives," a plan that never went beyond discussions, but one that included a ruse as an element—the defendant's "com[ing] out of the blaze with burns so that it would appear he had narrowly escaped." Hipp, who noted that Whitaker's schemes had been "motivated by money"—police testified that Whitaker stood to inherit the family estate, valued at $1 million—further testified that in December 2000, prior to the murders of which he stood accused, Whitaker had made another preempted plan, this time to "ambush his parents and brother as they entered their home after a dinner outing," a plan noted by the Houston Chronicle to be "virtually identical to the one [Champagne would soon testify] was actually carried out three years later." Trial judge Vacek's handling of the prosecution's use of a phone recording between Hipp and Whitaker would become an element of the defense's later appeal of the verdict.

In other early testimony, Steve Champagne described Whitaker recruiting him to be the getaway driver for Whitaker's eventual 2003 plan to murder his immediate family, and his testimony included the detail that Whitaker's gunshot wound was a ploy to make it look like he was a victim, too. Prosecutors presented evidence that although it wasn't Whitaker who shot his family members, he was responsible for the murders because he played the leading part in the conspiracy to commit the murders.

The prosecution's theory of motive focused on financial gain, with evidence variously described as pointing to Whitaker standing to inherit "about $1.5 million" after the death of his parents and brother, or that he had wanted to capitalize on a million-dollar life insurance payout. At trial, it was noted that Whitaker had access to an $80,000 trust fund from his grandparents although he testified that he did not know he could access it. Whitaker denied prosecution claims regarding the insurance profit motive, arguing that the only life insurance policy the family had was for $50,000 on his father's life.

Kent Whitaker had already forgiven his son and his co-conspirators for their parts in the murders (reported on as early as 2007), and had tried at the time of his son's trial, years earlier, to persuade the jury not to deliver a death sentence.

On Friday, March 2, 2007, prosecutor Fred Felcman and the State of Texas rested the prosecution's case in the capital murder trial for Thomas Bartlett Whitaker's role in the deaths of his brother and mother. Randy McDonald, attorney for the defense, rested their case on the same day, without calling witnesses, and judge Vacek scheduled closing arguments for the morning of March 5. After closing arguments, the case went to the jury. After deliberation the Fort Bend County jury convicted Whitaker of capital murder, under the Texas law of parties. The trial had lasted six days in total; the "jury deliberat[ed] for 2 hours, and sentenced Whitaker to death."

== Co-conspirator convictions ==
In a plea bargain worked out with prosecutors, Chris Brashear received a life sentence with the possibility of parole after 30 years for his role in the murders; Steven Champagne received 15 years after serving as the main witness for the prosecution.

== Appeals and lawsuits ==
Whitaker appealed his death sentence, suggesting nine points of error. In 2009, the state appeals court found in favor of the appellant on none of these points of law.

On October 1, 2013, Whitaker and two death row convicts, Perry Williams and Michael Yowell, sued Texas Department of Criminal Justice (TDCJ) directors Brad Livingston and Williams Stephens; James Jones, senior warden at the TDCJ's Huntsville prison, where executions take place; and unknown executioners. The lawsuit questioned the purity of the drug—pentobarbital—used to execute prisoners in the Texas prison system. On October 4, 2013, the case was dismissed for Whitaker and Williams because neither had been issued execution warrants at the time of the lawsuit. On October 9, 2013, Yowell was executed with the drug in question after U.S. District Judge Lynn Hughes refused to stay his execution. Whitaker and Williams later appealed to the U.S. Fifth Circuit Court of Appeals, which upheld the original dismissal. This case continued back and forth in courts for several years. In 2015, the Texas Attorney General's office agreed to test the doses of pentobarbital for Whitaker and Williams shortly before their executions. Whitaker withdrew his appeal pertaining to the purity of the drug used, pending at the Supreme Court of the United States, just before a decision by the Texas Governor to grant clemency and commute his sentence. The Supreme Court formally refused to hear the appeal on February 26, 2018.

After losing a separate appeal in the federal courts early in 2017, Whitaker's legal team appealed his claims to the U.S. Supreme Court. (Note: Thomas Bartlett Whitaker, Petitioner v. Lorie Davis, Director, Texas Department of Criminal Justice, Correctional Institutions Division (U.S. October 10, 2017) ("[Case] No. 17-5080, Capital Case. Order List: 583 U.S. / Tuesday, October 10, 2017 (12 pp.) / Certiorari Denied / 17-5080 Whitaker, Thomas B. V. Davis, Dir., TX DCJ (p. 6). NOTE: volume, reporter, etc. UNKNOWN."), Text. (Note: For list of the Supreme Court record of all proceedings and orders (and other information) stemming from the July 6, 2017 U.S. docketing of the appeal of the April 4, 2017 decision of the United States Court of Appeals for the Fifth Circuit (lower court, case no. 16-70013), see "No. 17-5080 *** CAPITAL CASE ***". Supreme Court of the United States.)) The appeal was certiorari denied. On November 1, 2017, his death warrant was signed, scheduling his execution for February 22, 2018.

== Commutation of sentence ==
Alongside the legal submission from the Whitaker legal team—an 18-page document from Whitaker lawyers Keith S. Hampton and James Rytting (the latter at Hilder & Associates), Whitaker's father, Kent, also appealed, cooperating with the legal team's submission and writing a letter in the public forum of the Houston Chronicle on January 18, 2018, asking that the Texas Board of Pardons and Paroles "spare my son". Board Chairman, David G. Gutiérrez, also met with Kent Whitaker for a half hour.

On February 20, 2018, in a rare decision, the Texas Board of Pardons and Paroles recommended that the death sentence be commuted to life imprisonment. The seven-member Board unanimously recommended clemency to Republican Governor Greg Abbott, the first time it had done so unanimously since 2009.

Abbott accepted their recommendation and commuted Whitaker's death sentence, noting that Whitaker had "voluntarily and forever waived any and all claims to parole in exchange for a commutation of his sentence from death to life without the possibility of parole." This was the first commutation of such a sentence from Abbott and the first from a Texas Governor since 2007. Abbott cited the fact that Whitaker did not fire the gun and that his father, Kent, "insists that he would be victimized again if the state put to death his last remaining immediate family member," as the reasons for the commutation. Abbott also said that “The totality of these factors warrants a commutation of Mr. Whitaker’s death sentence to life in prison without the possibility of parole. Mr. Whitaker must spend the remainder of his life behind bars as punishment for this heinous crime.”

Whitaker responded to the commutation of his sentence by saying, "I am thankful for this decision, not for me but for my dad." Whitaker had previously stated his strong opposition to the idea of life without the possibility for parole and wrote in his blog from prison:

[Life without parole], however, offends and assaults everything I believe in. It irrevocably denies any possibility of rehabilitation; it eviscerates hope entirely. It is for this reason that I would never sign for it, even if that were the only way to evade a return to death row. [Thomas Bartlett Whitaker, February 17, 2012]

Whitaker had earlier stated, when his execution was still expected, that he felt that his father would be further victimized by the execution.

== Chronology of cases ==
- Thomas Bartlett Whitaker v. The State of Texas, 286 S.W.3d 355 (Tex. Crim. App. 2009). Finalisation of Whitaker's conviction within the Texas system. Case No. AP-75,654, arising from Cause No. 42,969 in the 400th District Court, Fort Bend County, Texas. The court opens, noting that the Appellant did not "challenge the sufficiency of... evidence" supporting the original conviction for capital murder, appealing only the sentence of death, there raising "raises nine points of error". The court cursorily rejected five as having been earlier decided (without subsequent change in court opinion). Four others the Court addressed as new arguments, regarding the prosecutions reference at trial to Whitaker's original pre-trial "proffer" for penalty other than death and its omission from the trial record, "nonuniform 'application of the law'" during trial and sentencing, and admission at trial of arguably prejudicial parts of a recording related to the 2001 murder plot; the Appellant argued these constituted reversible error denying Whitaker's state and federal constitutional rights to a fair trial. The Court concluded, "[f]inding no merit in any ... points" and "affirmed the judgment of the trial court", including sentence.
- Thomas Whitaker, Perry Williams and Michael Yowell v. Brad Livingston et al. (S.D. Tex. October 1, 2013, Case 4:13-cv-02901). Whitaker, Williams, and Yowell argued that the drugs used for lethal injection in Texas prisons "runs a substantial risk of grave pain."
- Thomas Whitaker; Perry Williams, v. Brad Livingston, Executive Director of the Texas Department of Criminal Justice; William Stephens, Director, Texas Department of Criminal Justice, Correctional Institutions Division; James Jones; Unknown Executioners (5th Cir. 2015), Text. "Before Prado, Elrod, and Graves, Circuit Judges. / Per Curiam / Pursuant to 5th Cir. R. 47.5, the court has determined that this opinion should not be published and is not precedent except under the limited circumstances set forth in ... 47.5.4." Case No. 13-20750, Appeal of the Fed. R. Civ. P. 12(b)(1) dismissal, by the district court, of a defendant civil action that had asserted that their rights to due process, access to the courts, and punishment not cruel or unusual were violated. Here, the order of the district court was vacated, and the case remanded "so that Whitaker [and Williams be] able to fully develop ... claims based on the existing protocol for an appropriate trial on the merits."
- Thomas Bartlett Whitaker, Petitioner v. Lorie Davis, Director, Texas Department of Criminal Justice, Correctional Institutions Division (U.S. October 10, 2017), Text. Appeal of Whitaker's case to the U.S. Supreme Court, Case No. 17-5080, Capital Case, docketed on July 6, 2017, information drawn from a posting of the Order List for 583 U.S. for Tuesday, October 10, 2017 (entry on p. 6 of 12 pp.). For the Supreme Court record listing all proceedings and orders arising from the July 6, 2017 U.S. docketing of the appeal of the April 4, 2017 decision of the United States Court of Appeals for the Fifth Circuit (lower court, case no. 16–70013), see this record, accessed January 6, 2022. The petition was certiorari denied on October 10, 2017, with the Court providing no comment or explanation.
- "Whitaker vs. Stephens" (PDF). gpo.gov.
- Thomas Bartlett Whitaker vs. Lorie Davis
- Thomas Whitaker and Christopher Wilkins, et al. v. Oliver J. Bell, Members of the Tx. Brd. of Criminal Justice, John Whitmire, David J. Callender, M.D., Governor Rick Perry, et al.

== Other post-conviction developments ==
Thomas Whitaker and other inmates initiated an unsuccessful class action against the State of Texas, addressing the conditions on its death row, where inmates are kept in solitary confinement for 23 hours a day.

Kent Whitaker and his father, the only surviving victim of the crime, wrote the book, Murder by Family: The incredible true story of a son's treachery and a father's forgiveness, which — as described by Barry Leibowitz for CBS News — is about his "heart-wrenching journey ... to forgive the nameless stranger" responsible for his wounding, and the "brutal murder of his wife and son," a journey that included his realizing that the murder "had been orchestrated by [his] oldest son Bart." (Note: Murder by Family ... is the story of Kent Whitaker's heart-wrenching journey toward forgiveness and faith after the brutal murder of his wife and son. While lying in the emergency room after being airlifted from his home, Kent soon learned of his family's fate. His emotions called for a response to either forever hate the murderer ... or forgive him. At that moment, Kent made the decision to forgive the nameless stranger who had taken so much. 'I have had a hundred people tell me that they think I'm nuts — that I should hate the shooter and cry out for vengeance,' writes Kent. 'Perhaps I am crazy, but I believe that in those early moments God worked supernaturally, allowing me to forgive completely and immediately ... Little did I realize just how important my decision to forgive would be in the coming months.' An investigation uncovered that a murder plot had been orchestrated by Kent's oldest son Bart — whom Kent had unknowingly forgiven. Kent Whitaker gives readers a behind-the-scenes account from the day of the murders up to Bart's sentencing, and includes excerpts of letters from Bart as he tries to explain why he did it.) Whitaker provides an account from his perspective as father "behind-the-scenes," focusing on the time frame from the crime through his son's sentencing, addressing motive, and including portions of his correspondence with his son.

Whitaker earned an undergraduate degree from Adams State University, and a Master's degree in Humanities from California State University, Dominguez Hills. These are reported to have been earned while he was on death row. For the latter, he appears to have presented a thesis in partial fulfillment of the degree, entitled "Who Fears Hell Runs Toward It," in summer 2018. This master's thesis has been the subject of some controversy, as someone appears to have offered it as a book for sale (see also below).

=== Writing ===
Whitaker has contributed to Solitary Watch, where he wrote about the effects of solitary confinement on himself and other death row inmates. He also contributed to Hell Is a Very Small Place: Voices from Solitary Confinement.

Whitaker won prizes in PEN America's Prison Writing Program for his essay "Hell's Kitchen," (Note: The PEN Prison Writing Program ... has a slightly different agenda ... to help convicted criminals become writers '[believing] in the restorative and rehabilitative power of writing' ... [and] 'use of the written word as a legitimate form of power.” But what is the nature of the “power” of the written word? And what, moreover, will this power restore and rehabilitate? [Is PEN] honoring an important strand of America’s liberal intellectual heritage? ...pledging allegiance to a romantic coupling of art and freedom? ... inadvertently helping to bind prisoners ever more insidiously to the carceral regime? Or ... claiming something that is actually true? This article addresses these questions through a reading of Thomas Bartlett Whitaker’s prize-winning essay “Hell’s Kitchen” and finds that the power of Whitaker’s prison writing resides in its capacity to shock readers into a sensory appreciation of the radical strangeness of life lived in a state of civil death.) "Manufacturing Anomie" and the essay "A Nothing Would Do as Well." He was named a 2018-2019 PEN America Writing for Justice Fellow, a program that aims to support creation of "written works of lasting merit that illuminate critical issues related to mass incarceration and catalyze public debate." Scholarly attention has been directed toward this PEN program, noting that while PEN was an esteemed human rights organization known for the defense of free speech rights, in particular of persecuted writers, the Prison Writing Program presented a distinct agenda, namely in a "[belief] in the restorative and rehabilitative power of writing" to "help convicted criminals become writers," an aim which raises questions about the nature and residence of the power inmates are given and about its impact on prisoners and on society. Ira Wells, in particular, points to Whitaker's participation in the program to exemplify the questions, declaring Whitaker's prison writing powerful in its ability to "shock readers into a sensory appreciation of the radical strangeness of [his] life lived."

In 2007, Whitaker founded an inmate blog, originally created with the assistance of his father and now maintained by volunteers, entitled Minutes Before Six; it has published his work and trial records, and articles, poetry, and art from inmates held in prisons in the United States. The name of the blog references "the hour at which executions take place in Texas."

As of 2019, the Texas Department of Criminal Justice was investigating a report that Whitaker's master's thesis was being offered for sale online.

=== Bibliography of Whitaker's written work ===
Examples of the prison writing of the title subject, with dates of their first publication, include:

- Whitaker, Thomas Bartlett (2016). "A Nothing Would Do As Well". In Casella, Jean; Ridgeway, James; Shourd, Sarah (eds.). Hell Is a Very Small Place: Voices from Solitary Confinement. The New Press. pp. 101–113. ISBN 9781620971376.
- Whitaker, Thomas Bartlett (May 5, 2011). "Hell's Kitchen". PEN.org. PEN America.
- Whitaker, Thomas Bartlett (July 7, 2014). "Manufacturing Anomie". PEN.org. PEN America.
- Whitaker, Thomas Bartlett (July 7, 2014). "A Nothing Would Do As Well". PEN.org. PEN America.

== See also ==
- Dana Ewell – a California man who arranged the execution of his family after lying about business success while at college
