= Terry Kupers =

American psychiatrist

Terry Allen Kupers
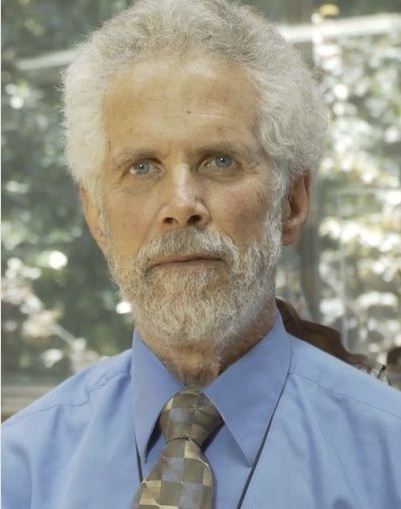
- Born: October 14, 1943 (age 83); Philadelphia, Pennsylvania
- Occupations: Psychiatrist, Professor

Academic background
- Education: Stanford University, UCLA School of Medicine, UCLA Neuropsychiatric Institute

Academic work
- Discipline: Psychiatry
- Sub-discipline: Psychoanalytic Psychotherapy, forensic psychiatry, and community mental health
- Institutions: The Wright Institute
- Main interests: Solitary confinement, Mental health services in correctional facilities, community mental health
- Notable works: Public Therapy, Ending Therapy, Revisioning Men’s Lives, Prison Madness, and Solitary
- Website: https://www.wi.edu/psyd-faculty-terry-kupers

Terry Allen Kupers M.D., M.S.P. is a psychiatrist and expert on correctional mental health and the detrimental effects of solitary confinement. He is known for his expertise in the fields of psychoanalytic psychotherapy, forensic psychiatry, and community mental health. He is Professor Emeritus at the Wright Institute in Berkeley, California. His forensic psychiatry experience includes testimony in multiple large class action lawsuits concerning jail and prison conditions, sexual abuse behind bars, and the quality of mental health services within correctional facilities.

== Early life and education ==
Kupers was born on October 14, 1943, in Philadelphia, Pennsylvania, the third of six children born to Jewish parents Edward Carlton Kupers, M.D. and Frances Shirley Kupers (nee Praissman). His father was a doctor who served in the U.S. Army Air Forces during World War II, and his mother was a nurse and caregiver to their six children. After the war, the family returned to Los Angeles, where Kupers grew up. He attended public schools, graduating from Fairfax High School in 1960, where he was a member of the Ephebians honor society.

Kupers attended Stanford University, graduating in 1964 with a BA in Psychology. He graduated from UCLA School of Medicine in 1968. He then completed an internship at Kings County Hospital and Downstate Medical Center in Brooklyn, New York in 1969.

Following his internship, Kupers undertook a three-year Psychiatry Residency at the UCLA Neuropsychiatric Institute, spending an elective year at the Tavistock Institute in England studying object relations theory and brief psychotherapy. He later pursued a postdoctoral fellowship at the UCLA Neuropsychiatric Institute, specializing in social and community psychiatry, and earned his master's degree in Social Psychiatry in 1974.

== Career ==
Since 1977, Kupers has been actively involved in community mental health and forensic psychiatry. He began his forensic pscyhiatry career by providing expert testimony in the case of Rutherford vs. Pitchess, where prisoners sued Los Angeles County because their jail violated their human rights. He also provided testimony in the case of Ashker v. Brown, which ended the use of long-term solitary confinement at Pelican Bay State Prison in California.

In 1981, Kupers joined the faculty of the Wright Institute's Clinical Psychology program, where he is now a professor emeritus. Over the years, Kupers has taught a variety of courses, both at the Wright Institute and at other graduate schools in Los Angeles and San Francisco. Classes he has taught include Basic Psychoanalytic Concepts, Social Psychopathology, Brief Psychotherapy, and Forensic and Correctional Mental Health.

Kupers has served as a consultant for various human and civil rights campaigns, including those of Human Rights Watch and Disability Rights California.

== Publications ==
Kupers is the author of six books and the editor of two others. He has also written nearly one hundred articles and book chapters. His first three books, Public Therapy, Ending Therapy, and Revisioning Men’s Lives, cover a wide range of topics, including public mental health, psychoanalytic theory, toxic masculinity and gender theory. His next two books, Prison Madness and Solitary, focus on mental health, the damaging conditions of confinement, and human rights issues in the carceral system, particularly in solitary confinement. His most recent book, Ending Isolation: The Case Against Solitary Confinement, which he co-authored with Christopher Blackwell, Deborah Zalesne and Kwaneta Harris, continues his focus on the controversial practice of solitary confinement.

Kupers wrote an essay as part of the book Hell Is a Very Small Place, a collection of essays by those who have experienced solitary confinement and experts in the field. Kupers also authored the screenplay for a TED-Ed short animated video titled “How Isolation Changes Your Brain,” which explores the long-term impacts of social isolation.

== Accolades ==
Kupers is a Distinguished Life Fellow of the American Psychiatric Association. He received the Exemplary Psychiatrist Award from the National Alliance on Mental Illness (NAMI) in 2005, the William Rossiter Award for his global contributions to forensic mental health from the Forensic Mental Health Association of California in 2009, the Gloria Huntley Award from NAMI in 2020, and the Judge Stephen Goss Lifetime Achievement Award from the Judges and Psychiatrists Leadership Initiative and the Council of State Governments in 2024.
