= Solitary Watch =

- Available in: English
- Creator: James Ridgeway
- Editors: Jean Casella and James Ridgeway
- Website: solitarywatch.org
- Commercial: No
- Launched: 2009

Solitary Watch is a web-based project that aims to bring public attention to the widespread use of solitary confinement in the United States. Its mission is to provide the public—as well as practicing attorneys, legal scholars, law enforcement, and people in prison and their families—with a reputable source of unfolding news, original reporting, firsthand accounts, and research on solitary confinement and other harsh prison conditions to generate public debate and policy change.

== History ==
Solitary Watch launched its website in December 2009. Created by journalist James Ridgeway and writer/editor Jean Casella, the website features original reporting, fact sheets, resources and information, and the "Voices from Solitary" project, which collects firsthand narratives from people who have served time in solitary confinement. Within its first nine months, the website attracted over 100,000 visitors.

In 2015, as part of its "Lifelines to Solitary" initiative, Solitary Watch started a pen pal program designed to connect individuals in solitary confinement with volunteers on the outside. The organization also coordinates the "Photo Requests from Solitary" project, which invites individuals in solitary to request images of real or imagined scenes. These requests are fulfilled by outside artists and sent back to the person who made the request.

== Voices from Solitary ==
As of July 2023, Solitary Watch has collected over 150 personal essays, stories, and poems written by individuals who have survived the lived experience of solitary confinement. Titles in the series include "Living on Deathwatch," "Books are a Spark in the Dark," "Everyday Torture," and "A Sentence Worse Than Death."

== Hell Is a Very Small Place ==
Solitary Watch's James Ridgeway and Jean Casella, along with survivor of solitary Sarah Shourd, published Hell Is a Very Small Place in 2016. The first major anthology of essays written by people in solitary confinement, the book aims to shed light on the humanitarian crisis taking place in United States prisons and jails and has been described in the Los Angeles Review of Books as a "minor act of rebellion" for being "composed of communication and observation that is not supposed to exist." The firsthand accounts in the book are supplemented by writings from medical, legal, and human rights experts.

== Ridgeway Reporting Project ==
Since 2019, Solitary Watch has worked with currently and formerly incarcerated journalists to craft long-form articles on solitary confinement that are co-published with other media outlets. The journalists are selected through a competitive application process and are supported by grants ranging from $500 to $2500. Originally known as the Solitary Confinement Reporting Project, the initiative was renamed the Ridgeway Reporting Project after Solitary Watch co-founder James Ridgeway died in February 2021.

== Selected publications ==
- Calculating Torture: Analysis of Federal, State, and Local Data Showing More Than 122,000 People in Solitary Confinement in U.S. Prisons and Jails. Solitary Watch and the Unlock the Box Campaign, May 2023.
- Hell Is a Very Small Place: Voices from Solitary Confinement, ed. Jean Casella, James Ridgeway, and Sarah Shourd. New York: The New Press, 2016.
- Louisiana on Lockdown: A Report on the Use of Solitary Confinement in Louisiana State Prisons, With Testimony from the People Who Live It. Solitary Watch, American Civil Liberties Union of Louisiana, and Loyola University New Orleans, June 2019.
- Solitary Confinement is Never the Answer: A Special Report on the COVID-19 Pandemic in Prisons and Jails, the Use of Solitary Confinement, and Best Practices for Saving the Lives of Incarcerated People and Correctional Staff. Solitary Watch and the Unlock the Box Campaign, June 2020.
- Unlocking Solitary Confinement: Ending Extreme Isolation in Nevada State Prisons. American Civil Liberties Union of Nevada, Nevada Disability Advocacy and Law Center, and Solitary Watch, February 2017.
