= Sarah Shourd =

American journalist, author and playwright

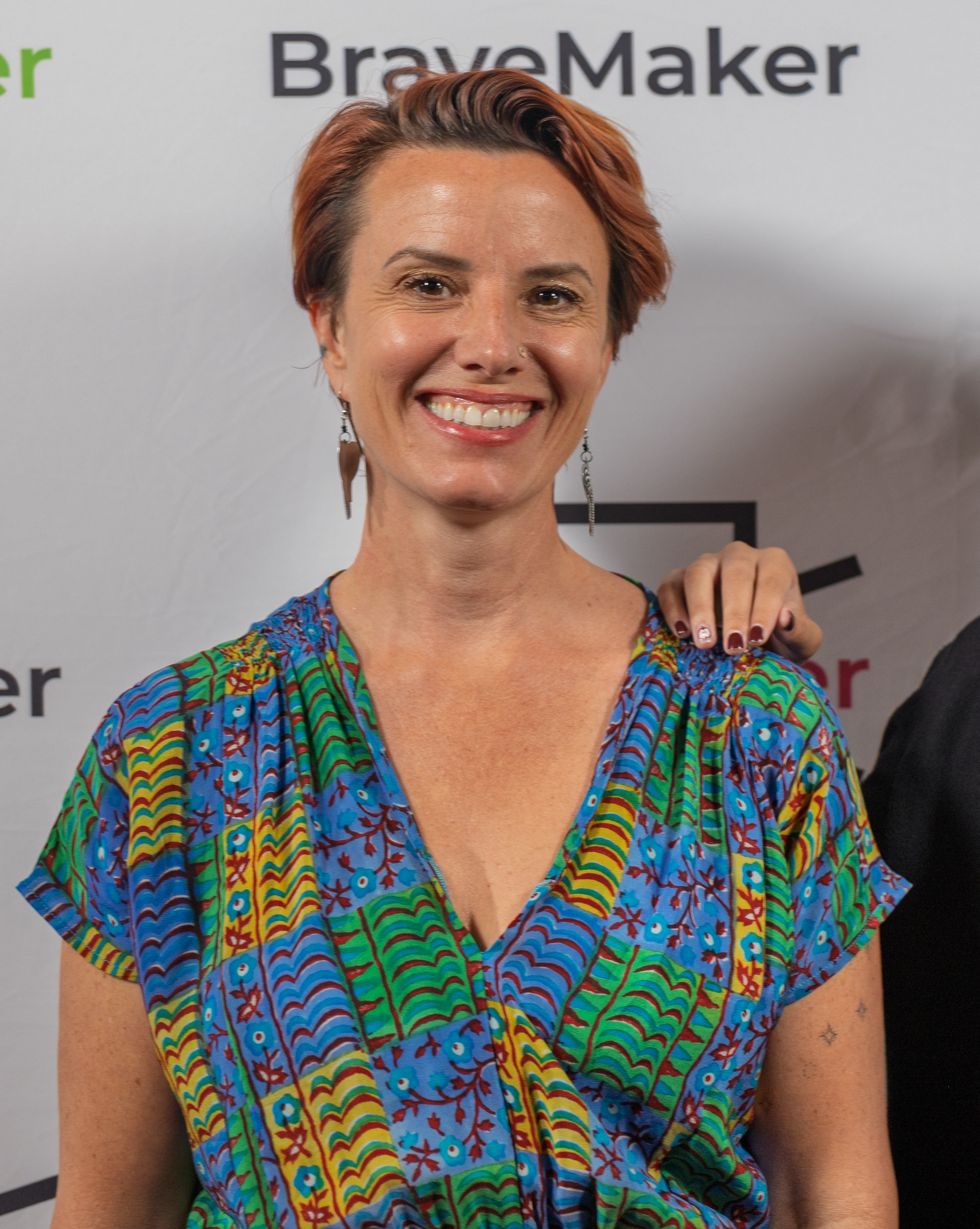
- Shourd at the BraveMaker Film Festival in 2026

A Sarah Shourd is an American journalist, author and playwright. She is an advocate against the overuse of solitary confinement in prisons. In 2009 and 2010, she was held as a political hostage in Iran's Evin Prison for 410 days under accusations of espionage. She subsequently coauthored a book about the experience with her fellow hostages, Josh Fattal and Shane Bauer. On September 14, 2010, the Iranian government released Shourd to the care of the Omani government.

== Iranian trial and imprisonment, and calls for release ==
In July 2009, Shourd was on a weekend trip with her then-boyfriend Shane Bauer and their friend Josh Fattal, who was visiting from the U.S. Shourd and Bauer lived in Damascus, Syria at the time. On July 31, 2009, Shourd was captured by Iranian border police after entering Iran while hiking around Ahmad Awa, a popular tourist destination in Iraqi Kurdistan, which was considered an American tourist-friendly destination. The soldiers accused them of illegally crossing into Iran and arrested them on the spot. They were driven to Evin Prison, in Tehran, where Shourd spent 410 days in solitary confinement in the political ward. She suffered from extreme depression and anxiety as a result of her time in solitary confinement. The arrest of Shourd and her two friends led to a global efforts campaigning for their release. Amnesty International also called on the Iranian authorities and demanded for the three's release.

In 2010, Iran said they would release Shourd owing to her poor health condition (she was diagnosed with a pre-cancerous condition) after holding her more than a year in jail after a payment of bail of $500,000. She was finally released in September 2010, after a deal was brokered by the Swiss embassy that represents the US interests in Iran (the U.S. and Iran have not had diplomatic ties since 1979.) After her release, Shourd stated that she was released because she was a woman and in solitary confinement, not because of her health condition. She and her family publicly thanked Oman for playing a crucial role in making arrangements for securing her bail. She also thanked Ali Khamenei and President Ahmadinejad for her release, fearing that an absence of such a statement would prevent the releases of Bauer and Fattal. She was officially indicted of espionage and illegal entry by Iran. Then-President of the United States Barack Obama issued a statement that he was pleased that she was released and was being reunited with her family.

== Career ==
As a journalist, Shourd has published in a variety of outlets, such as the New York Times, Mother Jones, Reuters, Daily Beast, Salon, among others. In 2014, Shourd was a Visiting Scholar at the University of California at Berkeley.

Shourd wrote, produced, and later directed a play on the subject of solitary confinement, The BOX, which premiered at Z Space in San Francisco in 2016, where it was directed by Cuban playwright Michael John Garcés. The play is based on the two-year investigation Shourd conducted while working with watchdog organization Solitary Watch and as a visiting scholar at UC Berkeley's Center for Law and Society, wherein she collected over 75 testimonies from prisoners kept in isolation in prisons across the U.S. In 2019, she was a Knight fellow at Stanford University.

She works as an independent journalist, social engagement artist, and human rights strategy consultant in Oakland, California.

== Personal life ==
Shourd received her Bachelors of Arts in 2001 from University of Berkeley.

Shane Bauer proposed to Shourd while the two were in prison. They married on May 5, 2012 in California, and subsequently divorced in 2019.

== Bibliography ==
=== Books ===
Year	Title	Notes
2014	A Sliver of Light	Co-authored with Shane Bauer and Joshua Fattal
2016	Hell Is a Very Small Place: Voices from Solitary Confinement	Editor, along with James Ridgeway and Jean Casella
2019	Flying Kites: A Story about the 2013 California Hunger Strike.	

=== Essays and Op-eds ===
Year	Title	Publication
2011	Tortured by Solitude	The New York Times
2014	How We Survived Two Years of Hell As Hostages in Tehran	Mother Jones
2014	Torture Chambers of the Mind	The Washington Spectator
2015	How Zapatista women learned to wear the pants—literally	Salon
2020	Coronavirus crisis exposes public safety risk of mass incarceration	San Francisco Chronicle

== Awards ==
Year	Name
2016	GLIDE Memorial Church's Hero Award

== Fellowships and Grants ==
Year	Name
2014	Mesa Refuge Fellowship
2015	Furthur Foundation Grant
2013	Shuttleworth Foundation Grant
2016	Ragdale Residency
2019	John S. Knight Journalism Fellowships at Stanford

Shourd was a Visiting Scholar at the University of California Berkeley’s Center for Law and Society in 2014. She has been awarded numerous grants and fellowships including from the Blue Mountain Center, the CA Endowment, the Entrekin Foundation, the Neda Nobari Foundation, the Vital Funds Project, the Wattis Foundation, and the Zellerbach Family Foundation, among others.
