= Minutes Before Six =

Prisoner-run blog sharing content by US inmates

Minutes Before Six (est. 2007) is an American blog that publishes articles, poetry and art from inmates held in prison in the United States. The website was founded by former Texas death row inmate Thomas Bartlett Whitaker with the help of volunteers in the free world. The name of the website refers to the hour (6 PM Central Time) at which (barring any pending appeals not decided) executions start to take place in Texas. The website provides a channel for prisoners (without access to the internet) to express themselves to the outside world.

Prisoners send their contribution by postal mail to the Editor, Dina Milito. Volunteers then digitize them and post them online. Minutes Before Six is a nonprofit organization (EIN #82- 3422504). Milito, a victim of violent assault seeking to understand violence, wrote to Whitaker and other condemned inmates and is an opponent of capital punishment. Eventually the blog expanded to include other writers from prisons throughout the USA.
