= Fragile masculinity =

Anxiety due to a feeling of inadequate masculinity

Fragile masculinity is a concept describing the potential anxiety among males who feel they do not meet cultural standards of masculinity. Evidence suggests that this concept is necessary to understand their attitudes and behaviors. Research has shown that this anxiety can manifest in various ways, including aggressive behavior, resistance to changing gender norms, and difficulty in expressing vulnerability.

== Concept ==
Psychology research has endorsed the concept of "precarious manhood", in which males face social pressures to publicly demonstrate their manliness. Under precarious manhood, threats to masculinity can result in a loss of one's status as a man. Masculinity may be viewed as "elusive and tenuous," when men feel insecure or threatened in their gender performance of masculinity they may feel it is necessary to prove it repeatedly. It is neither inevitable nor permanent; it must be earned "against powerful odds". As a result, men who have their masculinity challenged may respond in ways that are unpleasant, or even harmful. However, a 2026 analysis of the experimental research on precarious manhood found that statistically significant findings were substantially overrepresented in the published literature, meaning that studies or results finding an effect were more likely to be published or reported than those finding no evidence of an effect.

== Factors ==
=== Race and ethnicity ===
Race is a factor in American standards of masculinity. Hegemonic masculinity is denied to men of color, as well as working class white men. This has profound implications for the life trajectories and attitudes of African-American men.

Asian American men are frequently unable to be perceived as masculine in American society, and there is growing anger from young Asian-American men that they cannot be made to fit the standard of American masculinity. It is a common complaint among young Asian-American men that they struggle to compete with White American men for Asian women. This anger has led to the formation of online communities for Asian men who are concerned about their reputation, and two such communities on Reddit have been implicated in the online harassment of Asian women who are in interracial relationships with White American men. On the other hand, some Asian-American men have rejected the hegemonic notion of masculinity and embraced their own alternative form of masculinity, which values education and law-abidingness over American notions of masculinity.

=== Age ===
As young men try to find their place in society, age becomes an important variable in understanding male fragility. Men in the 18–25 age range display riskier and more aggressive behavior. In some places, younger men have constant threats to their manhood and have to prove their manhood daily. The more the manhood was threatened, the more the aggressiveness.

=== Parenthood ===
Research has found that fathers are less likely to view masculinity as fragile compared to non-fathers. This suggests that the experience of being a father might reinforce a man's masculine identity. However, low self-perceived masculinity after parenthood was a predictor of sexual depression among fathers.

== Behavior ==
When men feel their masculinity has been threatened, they often attempt to regain their sense of authority. The threats may include having a female supervisor or being given a job traditionally viewed as feminine. They may react by engaging in harmful behavior, such as undermining and mistreating colleagues, lying for personal gain, withholding help and stealing company property.

Online harassment is a common response from men who are intimidated by displays of strength by women.

A 2012 study, using a racially diverse sample of jail inmates, found that those who scored high on measurements of "fragile masculinity" tended to feel uncomfortable around women.

=== Health ===
A 2014 study found that men who endorsed traditional values of masculinity had worse health outcomes. Men with traditionally masculine beliefs are more likely to exhibit behaviors such as aggression (when externally challenged) and self-harm under stress (when internally challenged).

Men with strongly held masculine beliefs are half as likely to seek preventative healthcare; they are more likely to smoke, drink heavily and avoid vegetables; men are less likely to seek psychological help. A review of recent research found a link between the endorsement of precarious masculinity and poorer health outcomes in men. Although the link was "modest" it nevertheless accounted for some of men's poorer health outcomes, relative to women.

=== Sexual relationships ===
Women who believed their partner had fragile masculinity (such as in relationships where women earn two times as much money as their partners) were more likely to fake orgasms and were less likely to provide honest sexual communication. However these authors cautioned against the assumption that either partner is to blame in such cases, pointing out that American standards of masculinity are nearly impossible to meet.

== Political beliefs ==
A link has been shown between male fragility and aggressive political stances, such as climate change denial. This suggests that "fragile masculinity is crucial to fully understanding men's political attitudes and behaviors." The 2024 Trump campaign emphasized restoration of the traditional male role, likely motivating a rightward and conservative shift in young men.

== Proposed solutions ==
Based on their research, Maryam Kouchaki and colleagues have suggested that acknowledgement of fragile masculinity is a crucial first step toward improvement. They point out that many men are not even aware that they feel threatened, and that they are not even aware of toxic behaviors that may result from a threat. Increased self-awareness may allow men to break this pattern. Embracing healthy forms of masculinity was also suggested. Finally, these authors suggested that dismantling toxic workplace structures which encourage harmful masculine attitudes is a vital step in reducing fragile masculinity. According to Stanaland and colleagues, less rigid expectations of what masculinity should be could allow for a more resilient form of masculinity.

== Popular culture ==
The 2016 film Moonlight has been called a "masterclass in masculine fragility." One of the characters in the film, Chiron, is said to have embraced his fragility as a path to self-discovery.

== See also ==
- Acting out
- Castration anxiety
- Gender dysphoria
- Gender role
- Human mating
- Hypermasculinity
- Identity politics
- Mythopoetic men's movement
- Psychological stress
- Safety in numbers
- Social role
- Toxic masculinity
