= Toxic masculinity =

Social sciences concept

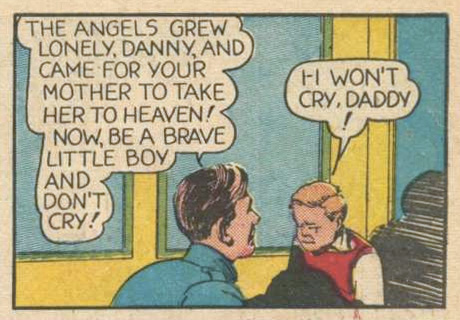
According to social learning theory, teaching boys to suppress emotions, as in the saying "big boys don't cry", is a significant part of gender socialization in Western society.

Toxic masculinity is a concept used in academic and media discussions to refer to those aspects of hegemonic masculinity that are socially destructive, such as misogyny, homophobia, and violent domination. These traits are considered "toxic" due in part to their promotion of violence, including sexual assault and domestic violence. Socialization of boys sometimes also normalizes violence, such as in the saying "boys will be boys" about bullying and aggression.

Self-reliance and emotional repression are correlated with increased psychological problems in men such as depression, increased stress, and substance use disorders. Toxic masculine traits are characteristic of the unspoken code of behavior among incarcerated men, where they exist in part as a response to the harsh conditions of prison life.

Other traditionally masculine traits such as devotion to work, pride in excelling at sports, and providing for one's family, are not considered to be "toxic". The concept was originally used by authors associated with the mythopoetic men's movement, such as Shepherd Bliss. These authors contrasted stereotypical notions of masculinity with a "real" or "deep" masculinity, which they said men had lost touch with in modern society. Critics of the term "toxic masculinity" argue that it incorrectly implies that gender-related issues are caused by inherent male traits.

== Terminology ==
The term "toxic masculinity" originated in the mythopoetic men's movement of the 1980s and 1990s. It later found wide use in both academic and popular writing. Media discussions since the 2010s have used the term to refer to traditional and stereotypical norms of masculinity and manhood. According to the sociologist Michael Flood, these include "expectations that boys and men must be active, aggressive, tough, daring, and dominant".

=== Mythopoetic movement ===
Some authors associated with the mythopoetic men's movement have referred to the social pressures placed upon men to be violent, competitive, independent, and unfeeling as a "toxic" form of masculinity, in contrast to a "real" or "deep" masculinity that they say men have lost touch within modern society. The academic Shepherd Bliss proposed a return to agrarianism as an alternative to the "potentially toxic masculinity" of the warrior ethic. Sociologist Michael Kimmel writes that Bliss's notion of toxic masculinity can be seen as part of the mythopoetic movement's response to male feelings of powerlessness at a time when the feminist movement was challenging traditional male authority:

Thus Shepherd Bliss, for example, rails against what he calls 'toxic masculinity'—which he believes is responsible for most of the evil in the world—and proclaims the unheralded goodness of the men who fight the fires and till the soil and nurture their families.

=== Academic usage ===
In the social sciences, toxic masculinity refers to traditional cultural masculine norms that can be harmful to men, women, and society overall. This concept of toxic masculinity does not condemn men or male attributes, but rather emphasizes the harmful effects of conformity to certain traditional masculine ideal behaviors such as dominance, self-reliance, and competition. Toxic masculinity is thus defined by adherence to traditional male gender roles that consequently stigmatize and limit the emotions boys and men may comfortably express while elevating other emotions such as anger. It is marked by economic, political, and social expectations that men seek and achieve dominance.

In a gender studies context, Raewyn Connell refers to toxic practices that may arise out of what she terms hegemonic masculinity, rather than essential traits. Connell argues that such practices, such as physical violence, may serve to reinforce men's dominance over women in Western societies. She stresses that such practices are a salient feature of hegemonic masculinity, although not always the defining features.

Terry Kupers of the Wright Institute describes toxic masculinity as "the constellation of socially regressive male traits that serve to foster domination, the devaluation of women, homophobia and wanton violence", involving "the need to aggressively compete and dominate others". According to Kupers, toxic masculinity includes aspects of hegemonic masculinity that are socially destructive, "such as misogyny, homophobia, greed, and violent domination"; these are contrasted with more positive traits such as "pride in [one's] ability to win at sports, to maintain solidarity with a friend, to succeed at work, or to provide for [one's] family". Feminist author John Stoltenberg has argued that all traditional notions of masculinity are toxic and reinforce the oppression of women.

== Gender norms ==
According to Kupers, toxic masculine gender roles are a feature of life for men in prisons in the United States, where they are reflected in the behavior of both staff and inmates. The qualities of extreme self-reliance, domination of other men through violence, and avoiding the appearance of either femininity or weakness, comprise an unspoken code among prisoners. Suppressing vulnerable emotions is often adopted to successfully cope with the harsh conditions of prison life, defined by punishment, social isolation, and aggression. These factors likely play a role in suicide among male prisoners.

Toxic masculinity can also take the form of bullying of boys by their peers and domestic violence directed toward boys at home. The often violent socialization of boys produces psychological trauma through the promotion of aggression and lack of interpersonal connection. Such trauma is often disregarded, such as in the saying "boys will be boys" about bullying. The promotion of idealized masculine roles emphasizing toughness, dominance, self-reliance, and the restriction of emotion can begin as early as infancy. Such norms are transmitted by parents, other male relatives, and members of the community. Media representations of masculinity on websites such as YouTube often promote similar stereotypical gender roles.

According to Ronald F. Levant and others, traditionally prescribed masculine behaviors can produce harmful effects including violence (including sexual assault and domestic violence), promiscuity, risky and/or socially irresponsible behaviors including substance use disorders, and dysfunction in relationships.

A 2026 study in New Zealand found that a desire to feel "manly" was not necessarily a sign of holding socially damaging views. The study found that only a small percentage of men surveyed fell into the worst category of "hostile toxicity", and that toxic masculinity tends to occur mainly among socially disadvantaged men.

== Health effects ==
The American Psychological Association (APA) argues that "traditional masculinity ideology" is associated with negative effects on mental and physical health. Men who adhere to traditionally masculine cultural norms, such as risk-taking, violence, dominance, the primacy of work, need for emotional control, desire to win, and pursuit of social status, tend to be more likely to experience psychological problems such as depression, stress, body image problems, substance use, and poor social functioning. The effect tends to be stronger in men who also emphasize "toxic" masculine norms, such as self-reliance, seeking power over women, and sexual promiscuity. The British Psychological Society argues that concepts such as toxic masculinity and hegemonic masculinity, although intended to describe specific behaviors, tend to imply that all men are dysfunctional in some way and advocates against "ideological approaches" such as "patriarchy theory" in treating men's mental health.

In the United States, the social value of self-reliance diminished during the first two decades of the twenty-first century, as society has moved more toward interdependence. Both self-reliance and the stifling of emotional expression can work against mental health, as they make it less likely for men to seek psychological help or to possess the ability to deal with difficult emotions. Preliminary research suggests that cultural pressure for men to be stoic and self-reliant may also shorten men's lifespans by causing them to be less likely to discuss health problems with their physicians.

Toxic masculinity is also implicated in socially-created public health problems, such as elevated rates of alcoholism and certain types of cancer among men, or the role of "trophy-hunting" sexual behavior in rates of transmission of HIV and other sexually transmitted infections.

Psychiatrist Frank Pittman wrote about how men are harmed by traditional masculine norms, suggesting that this includes shorter lifespans, greater incidence of violent death, and ailments such as lung cancer and cirrhosis of the liver.

== Criticism ==
The concept of toxic masculinity has received criticism from conservatives, as well as some feminists, academics, and sex researchers.

The concept has been criticized by academics for being poorly defined or under-defined; for promoting biological essentialism; for being ideological and yielding little empirical research on violence; for individualizing structural or systemic issues; for promoting a simple "toxic/healthy" binary that is unhelpful or harmful; for lacking intersectionality and failing to account for global cultural and class-based differences in expressions of masculinity; for being used to target men belonging to marginalized groups; and for being harmful to male mental health.

A 2020 pilot survey of 203 men and 53 women found a majority, around 80%, considered the term "insulting, probably harmful to boys, and unlikely to help men's behaviour", leading some researchers to argue against use of the term when dealing with male survivors of domestic abuse. Some domestic abuse charities, such as British charity Respect, suggest the use of alternative terms when handling male victims of abuse.

Researcher Andrea Waling argues that toxic masculinity is an essentialist concept that ignores the role of choice and context in causing harmful behaviors and attitudes related to masculinity. Waling further criticized the concept of 'healthy masculinity', stating that in using the term "we continue to set masculinity up as the only expression of gender that men can legitimately engage in, thus reinforcing the notion that femininity [...] remains a less valued, and less legitimate, expression of gender", concluding that use of either term contributes to, rather than addresses, gender inequalities. Scholars Timothy Laurie et al. further argue that the misuse of the term "toxic masculinity" can contribute to a misperception that feminists are uninterested in or hostile toward the lives of boys and men.

Josephine Browne argues that the label is counterproductive; a reductive term that struggles to escape from its historic roots, reducing complex socially learned behaviours to biological essence and allowing critics to shift the debate from institutions and structures to nature versus nurture. Browne describes use of the term as 'lazy' because it "homogenises men on a global scale – especially older men, or powerless men, the poor or the uneducated". She argues that many men are acutely aware of women's suffering and care deeply for women in their lives; therefore instead of limiting men's emotional vocabulary to "toxic and non-toxic", feminists should "support language that will generate much richer self-awareness and social analysis".

Carol Harrington criticizes the term as a poorly defined moral shorthand, surveying 60 published academic works in 2016 and finding "more than half" use the term without providing any definition. Harrington echoes the concern of Waling, arguing the "toxic/healthy binary" is individualizing, reducing behavior to a character flaw and serving to reinforce the very gender order it seeks to criticize. Harrington argues that 'toxic masculinity' should not be adopted as an analytical concept by feminists for these reasons, as it ultimately helps to maintain gender hierarchies, "individualize[s] responsibility for gender inequalities to certain bad men", and because accusations of 'toxic masculinity' have historically been leveled at marginalized men.

Many conservatives, including those in the alt-right, see the concept as incoherent or reject its existence. In January 2019, American conservative political commentators criticized the new American Psychological Association guidelines for warning about harms associated with "traditional masculinity ideology", arguing that it constitutes an attack on masculinity. APA chief of professional practice Jared Skillings responded to criticism by stating that the report's discussion of traditional masculinity is about "negative traits such as violence or over-competitiveness or being unwilling to admit weakness" and noting that the report also discusses positive traits traditionally associated with masculinity such as "courage, leadership, protectiveness".

Rutger Bregman stated after his first Reith Lectures that the opposite of toxic masculinity is heroic masculinity.

== See also ==
- Ambivalent sexism
- Bad boy archetype
- Internalized sexism
- Fragile masculinity
- Lad culture
- Machismo
- NotAllMen
- Patriarchy
- Precarious manhood
- Prison rape
- Roid rage
- Sexism
