= Solitary confinement in the United States =

Form of strict imprisonment in the United States

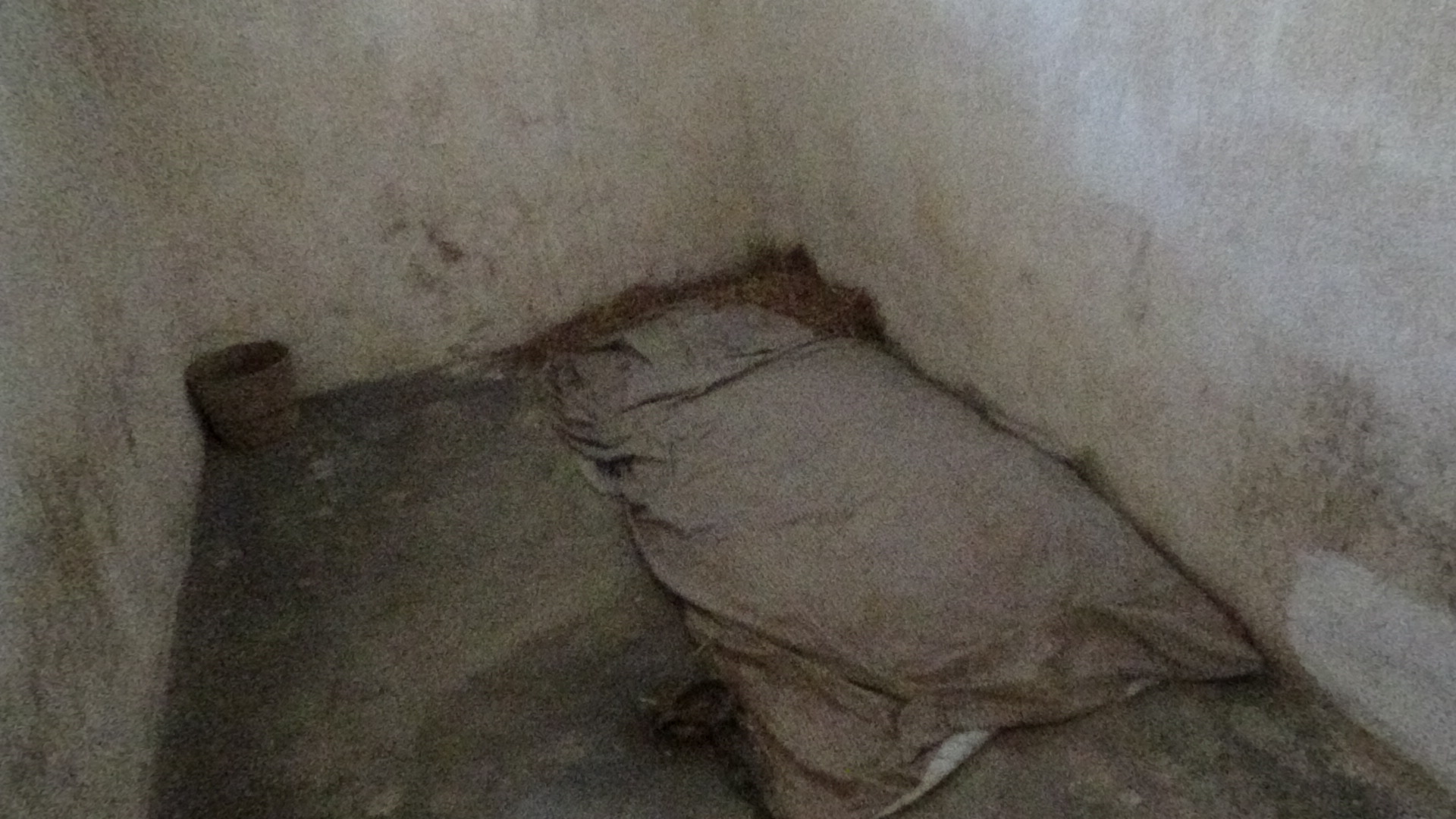
Original bed inside solitary confinement cell in Franklin County Jail, Pennsylvania

In the United States penal system, upwards of 20 percent of state and federal prison inmates and 18 percent of local jail inmates are kept in solitary confinement or another form of restrictive housing at some point during their imprisonment. Solitary confinement (sometimes euphemistically called protective custody, punitive segregation (PSEG) or room restriction) generally comes in one of two forms: "disciplinary segregation," in which inmates are temporarily placed in solitary confinement as punishment for rule-breaking; and "administrative segregation," in which prisoners deemed to be a risk to the safety of other inmates, prison staff, or to themselves are placed in solitary confinement for extended periods of time, often months or years.

Solitary confinement first arose in the United States in the 1700s among religious groups like the Quakers, who thought isolation with a Bible would lead to repentance and rehabilitation. The practice expanded significantly in the nineteenth century, when it was viewed as a humane alternative to prevailing methods of punishment like public floggings. However, by the early 1900s it had largely passed into disuse due to its high cost and the view that it was unethical. It would return as a common form of incarceration during the tough on crime political period in the 1980s and 1990s.

Today, solitary confinement is a controversial form of punishment that studies suggest has long-lasting detrimental effects on inmates' psychological health. Prison officials argue that solitary confinement is a necessary method of separating violent prisoners from the general population, separating vulnerable inmates (such as juveniles) from other inmates, and punishing prisoners who attempt to cause riots or try to escape. Critics argue that it is a cruel form of punishment which has been demonstrated to have long-lasting negative psychological effects on inmates (with some critics further contending that long-term solitary confinement is a form of torture) and is an unnecessary method of sequestering violent or vulnerable inmates, who can be safely separated through more humane means. Court cases arguing that solitary confinement violates the Eighth Amendment to the United States Constitution's ban on cruel and unusual punishment have had mixed success, with solitary confinement found to constitute cruel and unusual punishment when applied to mentally ill inmates but deemed permissible for sane adults.

== History ==
The penal system in the United States developed under two separate systems known as the Auburn system and Pennsylvania system. The current system of solitary confinement was derived originally from the Pennsylvania model which was characterized by "isolation and seclusion." Evidence has shown that Quakers and Calvinists supported solitary confinement as an alternative form of punishment. At the time it was meant to provide a prisoner with solitude "to reflect on his misdeeds" and restore his relationship with God. Solitary confinement was intended as an alternative to public floggings which were common at the time. In 1818, New York reformer and Friend, Thomas Eddy, lobbied for inmate labor and solitary confinement in place of other forms of punishment such as hanging. Shortly after, New York decided to include solitary confinement and inmate labor into their penal system.

In the United States federal prison system, solitary confinement is known as the Special Housing Unit (SHU), pronounced like "shoe" (/ʃuː/). California's prison system also uses the abbreviation SHU, but it stands for Security Housing Units. In Oregon, solitary confinement units are known as Intensive Management Units (IMUs), while in Pennsylvania, they are Restricted Housing Units (RHUs). According to a 2023 report from Solitary Watch and Unlock the Box, it is estimated that more than 122,000 individuals are held in solitary confinement in state and federal prisons and local jails on any given day.

The inmate held in solitary confinement for the longest time in U.S. federal prison was Thomas Silverstein, held in solitary confinement at the ADX Florence federal penitentiary in Colorado. beginning in 1983. Silverstein died in late May 2019. The inmate held in solitary confinement for the longest time in the United States is Albert Woodfox, the last of the Angola Three, in solitary in Louisiana State Penitentiary from 1972 to 2016. A May 2013 report on California's Pelican Bay State Prison in Mother Jones magazine also cites one inmate there who "recently marked his 40th year in solitary".

== Legality ==
Opponents of solitary confinement have argued with varying success that the practice violates prisoners' constitutional rights. Despite the long history of litigation over the practice, the US Supreme Court has yet to definitively state whether or not solitary confinement is unconstitutional. The Supreme Court considered the constitutionality of long-term solitary confinement only once, in Wilkinson v. Austin. In contrast to the Supreme Court's inaction, lower courts have imposed constitutional limitations on the use of solitary confinement. Despite such limitations, the federal courts have refused to find that solitary confinement is per se unconstitutional. The U.S. has also effectively "insulated itself from any official sanction for international violations by not submitting to the jurisdiction" of committees that enforce the International Covenant on Civil and Political Rights (ICCPR) or of the Committee Against Torture (CAT).

=== Eighth Amendment ===
Since solitary confinement has been designated as "cruel, inhuman or degrading treatment or punishment" under international law, many lawyers have argued that it is also the kind of "cruel and unusual punishments" prohibited by the Eighth Amendment. Proving this to be the case, however, has been a difficult task for attorneys at every level of the court system. The lack of clarity of the Eighth Amendment has raised questions with the use of solitary confinement that specifically constitutes "cruel and unusual punishment."

In light of the serious, long-lasting psychological effects solitary confinement can have, inmates have argued that the mental injuries they suffer qualify as "cruel and unusual punishment." Prison officials contend that placing inmates in prolonged solitary confinement is necessary for various reasons. Some of these reasons include separating violent prisoners from the general population, separating vulnerable inmates (such as juveniles) from others, and punishing those prisoners who attempt to cause riots or try to escape. Prisoners argue, however, that the nature of these kinds of offenses does not justify the use of solitary confinement; in their eyes "there is simply no strong security need for the total social isolation that exists at some supermax prisons".

A large portion of the court cases addressing solitary confinement have approached the practice as a violation of Eighth Amendment rights. Courts have generally agreed that solitary confinement is, indeed, a violation of the Eighth Amendment for inmates with preexisting mental illness or juveniles. However, the Supreme Court concluded that "while there was a risk of serious psychological injury to inmates, that risk was not of 'sufficiently serious magnitude' to find a 'per se' violation of the Eighth Amendment for all prisoners placed in long-term solitary confinement". Despite recognition of the negative consequences of forced isolation in prisons, the practice of solitary confinement remains constitutional in the United States.

Showing that solitary confinement constitutes cruel and unusual punishment has proven difficult for inmates and their attorneys. The Supreme Court requires 'extreme deprivations' in order to have merits for a 'conditions-of-confinement claim' and courts have also held that inmates are only protected against "certain kinds of extreme deprivations" by the Eighth Amendment. In Farmer v. Brennan, the Supreme Court set two requirements that must be fulfilled in order to challenge solitary confinement as "cruel and unusual". First, prisoners must show that a "substantial risk of serious harm to inmates" exists and second, that the prison officials were "deliberately indifferent" to such risk. To prove a prison official's "deliberate indifference," the prisoner must "show evidence that the official was 'actually' aware of a prisoner's serious need and chose to ignore it". Since the psychological impact of solitary confinement is not believed to be "objectively" cruel and unusual within the U.S. legal system, and because it is difficult to establish that prison officials are "indifferent" to prisoner health and safety, inmates and attorneys alleging these two requirements have faced limited success.

The Prison Litigation Reform Act (PLRA) further complicates inmates' ability to claim that solitary confinement's psychological damage constitutes cruel and unusual punishment. Section 1997e(e) of the PLRA states that

no Federal civil action may be brought by a prisoner confined in a jail, prison, or other correctional facility, for mental or emotional injury suffered while in custody without a prior showing of physical injury.

This demonstrates that the Eighth Amendment provides "greater protection" against physical injury than against mental pain. Therefore, unless a prisoner can demonstrate physical injury as a result of solitary confinement, he or she is unable to recover damages for any "mental or emotional injury" the confinement causes. As a result, the Eighth Amendment has not always been proven to be the most effective approach to argue against the practice of solitary confinement.

=== Due process and the Fourteenth Amendment ===
Litigating against solitary confinement on the basis of the Fourteenth Amendment and its Due Process Clause is another less common strategy inmates have used. The Fourteenth Amendment limits the "types of prisoners" that can be placed in solitary confinement and the time the prisoners can be confined. The Due Process Clause within the Fourteenth Amendment also regulates solitary confinement in that prisoners must be given reviews before and during their placement in solitary confinement. Court cases made on these bases do not necessarily address any "underlying problems" of solitary confinement, but they do call for increased monitoring, hearing, and reviews.

Inmates who are placed in solitary confinement "must be accorded meaningful periodic review to ensure that segregation [solitary confinement] is not a 'pretext for indefinite confinement'". As Jules Lobel, professor at the University of Pittsburgh School of Law, explains,

When a prisoner is placed in a supermax, the due process requirement of meaningful periodic review requires that his or her behavior be re-evaluated at regular intervals to determine whether supermax confinement is still warranted.

Lobel contends that the trend in U.S. supermax prisons is to not submit these reviews at all or to provide a review with a predetermined outcome to keep the prisoner in solitary confinement. If this is indeed the case, then such inmates' due process rights are violated.

In Wilkinson v. Austin, the Supreme Court held that, in addition to the due process right to meaningful review, prisoners also have a due process right to "a statement of the reasons why they were placed or retained at the supermax" so they can better understand how to behave in the future in order to be released from solitary confinement. Lobel argues that this "implies that the officials must provide something more than a general statement that the prisoner is very dangerous". According to Lobel this is not what usually happens at supermax facilities, so the inmates' due process rights are violated in this way as well.

In recent circuit court cases, courts have ruled that solitary confinement of 305 days or more constitutes an "atypical and significant hardship" that implicates due process.

=== Alternative litigation techniques ===
Recognizing that the amount of proof needed to show that solitary confinement violates prisoners' rights "is simply too high to trigger constitutional protections," attorneys have started to approach solitary confinement from a different angle. John F. Cockrell, a recent graduate from the University of Alabama School of Law, suggests that those who challenge solitary confinement do so in context of the Americans with Disabilities Act of 1990 (ADA). Cockrell reasons that

When claims under the Eighth and Fourteenth Amendments fail, Title II [of the ADA] may offer an avenue to improve the provision of services to the mentally ill in prisons and solitary confinement, but ipso facto improving the conditions under which all inmates in solitary confinement live.

In the past few years, several internal committees and administrative bodies involved in the United States prison and legal systems have also begun to question solitary confinement's legality. In June 2012, for example, the US Senate Judiciary Committee held its first hearing on solitary confinement. Likewise, as of 2013, the US Bureau of Prisons has announced that it will conduct its first review of how solitary confinement is used in federal prisons. Additionally, the US Department of Justice found multiple violations of the Constitution and ADA after investigating the use of solitary confinement for mentally ill inmates in two Pennsylvania prisons. The US Immigration and Customs Enforcement Agency (ICE) has also revised segregation procedures for detainees.

=== Mentally ill inmates and juveniles ===
Studies have illustrated that mentally ill inmates and juveniles are two groups more severely affected by solitary confinement than other prisoners. As such, the solitary confinement of mentally ill inmates and juveniles has been upheld as cruel and unusual in both international and US courts.

The UN has "expressly prohibit[ed] solitary confinement of juveniles and individuals with mental illness". The Convention on the Rights of Persons with Disabilities and Convention on the Rights of the Child have played major roles in establishing the UN's position on solitary confinement of mentally ill inmates and juveniles respectively.

Within the US legal system, too, courts have held that the solitary confinement of the mentally ill is "cruel and unusual". In fact, David Fathi, Director of the ACLU's National Prison Project, found that "every federal court that has considered claims by severely mentally ill prisoners held in solitary confinement has found this treatment unconstitutional". These court rulings are significant in light of the fact that more than half of the prisoners currently serving jail time in the US are mentally ill according to the US Bureau of Prisons. Furthermore, approximately 30% or more of prisoners in solitary confinement are mentally ill. These rulings have the potential to dramatically change how prisons deal with mentally ill inmates, as prison officials would no longer be able to "warehouse" "difficult" prisoners if they have a preexisting mental illness. These rulings do not guarantee that the mentally ill will not be put in solitary confinement; although they are considered a vulnerable group, these prisoners still have "limited" recourse to the Eighth Amendment.

One landmark case, Madrid v. Gomez, challenged the conditions of the Security Housing Unit (SHU) in the Pelican Bay State Prison. The court ruled that the current conditions were not "per se violative of the Eighth Amendment" with respect to all inmates. However, in regard to SHU's isolation of the mentally ill and the conditions of their solitary confinement, the court found that the prison had violated the Eighth Amendment. Despite it being a landmark case, the rulings of the case have yet to set a trend among cases against other prison systems because SHU's conditions were known to be more extreme and harsh than other supermax prisons.

Juveniles who are charged as adults and placed in adult prisons are usually put in protective custody, and often the conditions of protective custody are similar to those of solitary confinement. Juvenile justice experts, social scientists, and national correctional standards all agree that solitary confinement is an "ineffective therapeutic tool" that is detrimental to juveniles who are still in an "uncertain, unformed state of social identity". Given that they are developing mentally and physically, some experts have suggested that "they are severely and permanently damaged by such conditions to a greater extent than adults".

=== Troubled teen programs ===
Residential treatment centers and Therapeutic boarding schools have been found to use solitary confinement as punishment.

== Women ==
Solitary confinement has particular consequences for women that may differ from the way it affects men. Rates of solitary confinement for women in the United States are roughly comparable to those for men, with about 20% of female prisoners reported to have been in solitary confinement at some point during their incarceration. However, women often experience tougher sanctions and punishments compared with similar infractions committed by men.

== Black and Latino Americans ==
Solitary confinement has been shown to disproportionately affect people of color. In particular, Black and Latino individuals are placed in solitary at rates far higher than their white counterparts. A 2019 Correctional Leaders Association/Yale Law School study found that Black women make up 21.5% of the United States female prison population, but 42.1% of the U.S. female prison population held in solitary. Another study published in Science Advances found that 11% of all Black men born in Pennsylvania between 1986 and 1989 had been held in solitary by the age of 32. The study also found that Black and Latino men in the state were 8.2 and 2.5 times more likely to be held in solitary than white men, respectively.

== Juveniles ==
Juveniles are held in solitary confinement in jails and prisons across the United States, often for days, weeks, months, or even years. There is significant controversy surrounding the use of solitary confinement in the case of juveniles.

The effects of solitary confinement on juveniles can be highly detrimental to their growth and development. The isolation of solitary confinement can cause extreme anguish and provoke severe mental and physical health problems. Because young people are still developing, traumatic experiences like solitary confinement may have a profound negative effect on their rehabilitation.

The American Civil Liberties Union (ACLU) and Human Rights Watch created a report that incorporated the testimony of some juvenile inmates. Many interviewees described how their placement in solitary confinement exacerbated the stresses of being in jail or prison. Many spoke of harming themselves with staples, razors, even plastic eating utensils, having hallucinations, losing touch with reality, and having thoughts of or attempting suicide – all this while having extremely limited access to health care.

Juveniles in solitary confinement are routinely denied access to treatment, services, and programming required to meet their medical, psychological, developmental, social, and rehabilitative needs.

== Legislation and reform ==
Over the past decade, jurisdictions across the United States have made significant progress in reducing their use of solitary confinement. While this can be partly attributed to voluntary reforms instituted by prison administrators, much of this progress has taken place due to legislation passed at the state and local levels. Numerous states have passed bills banning the use of solitary for vulnerable groups including children, people with disabilities, and pregnant people, while several others have limited the use of solitary for all people to no more than 15 or 20 consecutive days. In states where such laws are in effect, corrections agencies have continued to hold people in solitary for days or months beyond the legal limit, pointing to the need for ongoing monitoring and enforcement.

Organizations in the United States working to end the use of long-term solitary include the American Friends Service Committee, the National Religious Campaign Against Torture, Solitary Watch, and the American Civil Liberties Union. Unlock the Box is a national coalition of advocacy groups with the goal of ending prolonged solitary confinement in the United States within the next ten years.

=== California ===
Opened in 1989, California's Pelican Bay State Prison was one of the nation's first and most prolific supermaximum-security prisons. Consisting exclusively of solitary confinement cells, the Pelican Bay Security Housing Unit (SHU) was designed to house incarcerated people in isolation for almost 23 hours a day with virtually no human contact. Sent to the SHU were not only the "worst of the worst" who had committed egregious acts of violence, but also individuals who had been validated as gang members, which could happen if they were caught possessing artwork or literature deemed radical, or if they were accused of gang affiliation by someone who had "debriefed" in order to return to the general prison population.

Individuals held in the Pelican Bay SHU organized a series of hunger strikes in 2011 and 2013, which have been described as the "backbone of the anti-solitary movement" in the United States. The largest of the strikes, which began in July 2013 and ended 60 days later, encompassed over 30,000 participants across 33 California prisons. Key to the success of the strikes was the organizers' decision to put aside racial hostilities that had been fostered within the SHU, as well as sustained partnerships between strike participants and outside advocates that drew national and international attention to the strikes.

In 2012, the Center for Constitutional Rights partnered with the lead organizers of the strike on a class action lawsuit, Ashker v. Governor of California, representing individuals housed in the Pelican Bay SHU. As a result of the litigation, the California Department of Corrections and Rehabilitation (CDCR) agreed to end indefinite solitary confinement in its facilities and implement due process for placements in SHU. Monitoring of the settlement agreement is ongoing, as CDCR has been found to have repeatedly violated the reforms.

Advocates introduced legislation to limit solitary confinement to consecutive 15 days and ban the use of solitary for vulnerable populations in 2022. Though the bill was vetoed by Governor Gavin Newsom after passing both chambers of the state legislature, it was reintroduced during the 2023 legislative session as AB 280. AB 280 failed to advance out of the Legislature during that year's session.

=== Connecticut ===
Connecticut's solitary confinement reform law is the PROTECT Act, which includes a 15-day limit on solitary confinement, as well as a ban on solitary for vulnerable populations and a requirement that individuals held in the general population must get at least five hours of out-of-cell time per day. Moreover, the legislation mandates the creation of an ombudsman and advisory commission to monitor prison conditions and oversee the implementation of reforms.

Just as California's anti-solitary legislation was vetoed by Governor Newsom in 2022, the PROTECT Act was vetoed by Ned Lamont when it was first passed by the state legislature in 2021. However, a coalition of advocates led by Stop Solitary CT continued to push for the bill to be signed into law and succeeded the following year. Legislative testimony submitted by incarcerated people was instrumental to winning legislators' support for the bill in both years.

=== Massachusetts ===
The Criminal Justice Reform Act (CJRA), signed into law by Governor Charlie Baker in 2018, created some restrictions on restrictive housing, which it defines as upwards of 22 hours of isolation a day. While the law does not set an absolute limit on the number of days a person can be held in solitary, it requires placement reviews every 90 days for most people in solitary and limits placements in solitary for people with serious mental illness to 72 hours. It also bans pregnant women from being placed in solitary and creates a Restrictive Housing Oversight Committee to monitor the reforms.

The Massachusetts Department of Corrections has attempted to circumvent the solitary confinement reforms codified in the CJRA, for example by creating Secure Adjustment Units where people are held in isolation for 21 instead of 22 hours a day. Because these units hold people in isolation for one hour less than the definition of restrictive housing specified in the law, they do not have to comply with the requirements set forth in the CJRA.

=== New Jersey ===
Passed in 2019, the Isolated Confinement Restriction Act limits placements in solitary in New Jersey prisons and jails to 20 consecutive days or 30 days in a 60-day period. It also prohibits any use of solitary for pregnant women, LGBTQ+ people, and people living with mental illness, and requires mental health evaluations before and during placements in solitary.

=== New York ===
In 2021, New York's Humane Alternatives to Long-Term (HALT) Solitary Confinement Act was passed and signed into law after more than a decade of activism. The most progressive anti-solitary legislation that had been passed up to that date, the HALT Act was the first to bring a state's use of solitary confinement in line with the 15-day limit mandated by the United Nations' Mandela Rules. It has since served as a model for similar bills introduced in other states including Connecticut, Nevada, and California.

Since the passage of HALT, New York State prisons have routinely thwarted key provisions of the legislation. A New York Focus investigation found that over 1,000 people had been put in solitary for disciplinary infractions that were ineligible for placement in solitary under HALT, and that more than half of the state's solitary confinement population had been held in solitary for longer than the 15 days specified by HALT. Furthermore, people housed in Residential Rehabilitative Units, therapeutic units created by HALT as an alternative to solitary, reported being shackled to their desks during programming and subjected to conditions virtually identical to solitary.

In 2023 the New York Civil Liberties Union and Prisoners' Legal Services of New York have filed a class action lawsuit against the state for perpetuating these and other violations of HALT. The Correctional Association of New York, a prison oversight nonprofit, has released a report documenting additional "numerous departures" from the law in the early months of HALT implementation. A mid-2024 judgement found in favor of the NYCLU, stating that state prisons routinely ignored the HALT Act.

Opposition to HALT was one cause of the 2025 New York corrections officers' strike, and suspension of HALT was one of the concessions. This suspension was temporarily reversed by court order on July 2.

==== New York City: Rikers Island ====
The New York City Department of Correction announced that it had ended punitive segregation for adolescents incarcerated on Rikers Island in December 2014. Two years later, in October 2016, it expanded this ban on punitive segregation to young adults age 21 and under. This latter policy change was motivated in part by the death of Kalief Browder, who had spent more than 700 days in solitary confinement on Rikers as a teenager before committing suicide two years after his release.

The death of Layleen Polanco, a 27-year-old transgender woman who died in solitary on Rikers following an epileptic seizure, sparked further calls for solitary reform. In June 2022, New York City councilmembers introduced Intro 549, which would ban solitary confinement for all people in New York City jails. Though the bill has received support from a supermajority of councilmembers, it has yet to be voted on by the City Council.

== Scrutiny and criticism ==
=== Psychological effects ===
It has been shown that solitary confinement has severe mental and psychological effects on prisoners. Prisoners in SHUs are isolated for long periods of time. Instances of assault and torture against these prisoners in response to trivial things have also been cited. Social isolation housing can reduce environmental stimulation and causes a feeling of loss of control over all aspects of a prisoner's daily life. These environmental risks include but are not limited to hypersensitivity to stimuli, distortions and hallucinations, increased anxiety and nervousness, diminished impulse control, severe and chronic depression, appetite loss and weight loss, heart palpitations, talking to oneself, problems sleeping, nightmares, self-mutilation, difficulties with thinking, concentration, and memory, and lower levels of brain function.

Researchers at McGill University paid a group of male graduate students to stay in small chambers that were to replicate solitary confinement cells. This study was to conduct an experiment on sensory deprivation and how it can cause psychiatric disorders while in solitary confinement as people are deprived of most of their senses in there. The plan was to observe these students for six weeks, but none lasted more than seven days.

From studying conditions at Pelican Bay, researchers argue that long-term social isolation "carries major psychiatric risks." Prisoners are susceptible to developing mental illnesses because they are confined to coffin-like conditions and denied access to basic health services. Illnesses range from anxiety, clinical depression, and self-mutilation to suicidal thoughts and SHU syndrome. Yet, the duration of the isolation is the most important factor in determining the effects of solitary confinement.

=== Prison violence ===
Kate King, professor and director of Criminal Justice at Murray State University, Benjamin Steiner, professor of Criminal Justice at the University of Cincinnati, and Stephanie Ritchie Breach, director of the Third District Youth Court, explain how while violence has always been a factor in prison life, the level of aggression is magnified in supermax prisons where all such members of the prison system are concentrated. These scholars argue that the violent nature of supermax prisons such as Pelican Bay State Prison are perpetrated by prison culture itself. King, Steiner, and Breach question the effectiveness of these institutions and claim the violent reputation of American prisons stems from this departure from the treatment model. Supermax prisons are also scrutinized on legal and ethical bases. Scholars Jesenia Pizarro and Vanja Stenius note that the overall constitutionality of these prisons are still quite unclear.

=== Recidivism ===
Shira E. Gordon, while a University of Michigan law student, argued that solitary confinement leads to an increase in recidivism and violence. To substantiate this conclusion, she cites two quantitative research based studies that support this nexus and counters those who argue that solitary confinement deters recidivism. Daniel Mears and William Bales "compared recidivism rates by matching…prisoners who were incarcerated in solitary confinement with prisoners who had been in the general prison population." They found that "24.2 percent of the prisoners held in solitary confinement were reconvicted of a violent crime compared to 20.5 percent of prisoners held in population." And this behavior may be attributed to the mental illnesses prisoners may develop, as well as the dehumanizing treatment they are subject to.

== See also ==
- Angola Three
- Prison control units
- History of United States prison systems
- Isolation to facilitate abuse
- Prison abolition movement
- Single-celling
- Box (form of torture involving solitary confinement in an overheated room)
- List of United States Supreme Court cases involving mental health
