= James Ridgeway =

American journalist (1936–2021)

- Born: James Fowler Ridgeway; November 1, 1936; Auburn, New York, U.S.
- Died: February 13, 2021 (aged 84); Washington, D.C., U.S.
- Education: Princeton University
- Occupation: Journalist
- Organizations: The Village Voice; The New Republic; Mother Jones; The Wall Street Journal
- Notable work: Blood in the Face; Hell Is a Very Small Place
- Spouse: Patricia Dodge (m. 1966)
- Children: 1

James Fowler Ridgeway (November 1, 1936 – February 13, 2021) was an American investigative journalist. In a career spanning six decades, he covered many topics including automobile industry safety, American universities, far-right movements including the Ku Klux Klan and Neo-Nazism, and campaigns against solitary confinement. He was the Washington correspondent for The Village Voice for over 30 years between the mid-1970s to mid-2000s, and had also worked for The New Republic, and Mother Jones. He had also contributed to magazines and newspapers including The New York Times, The New York Review of Books, The Wall Street Journal, and The Economist among others.

== Early life ==
Ridgeway was born on November 1, 1936, in Auburn, New York, to Florence (née Fowler) and George Ridgeway. His father was a professor and historian at Wells College, in Aurora, New York. His father had served as a British affairs specialist for the State Department during World War II. Ridgeway studied in schools in Washington, D.C. and Garrison, New York, before graduating from Hackley School, a private school in Tarrytown, New York, in 1955. He went on to graduate with a degree in English in 1959 from Princeton University. During his time at the university, he was an editor of The Daily Princetonian, the university's student newspaper.

== Career ==
Ridgeway started his career with The Wall Street Journal, where he covered banking and the economy. He later went to Europe, where he wrote for The Economist, The Guardian, and The Observer, as a freelancer. He returned to the United States in 1962, and moved to Washington, D.C., where he covered economics and industry for The New Republic for eight years. Along with his collaborator, Andrew Kopkind, he founded Mayday in 1968, which was later renamed as Hard Times. The newspaper covered popular movements of the time including the Vietnam war protests, Black Power movement, and students protest movements. He also went on to be an editor for the New Left magazine, Ramparts, between 1970 and 1975.

Ridgeway became nationally known when he revealed in The New Republic that General Motors had hired private detectives to tail consumer advocate Ralph Nader in an attempt to dig up information that might discredit him (Nader was behind litigation which challenged the safety of the Chevrolet Corvair). Ridgeway's revelations of the company's snooping and dirty tricks prompted a Senate subcommittee led by Senator Abraham Ribicoff to summon James Roche, president of GM, to explain his company's harassment — and apologize. The incident catapulted auto safety into the public spotlight and helped send Nader's book, Unsafe at Any Speed (1965), to the top of the bestseller lists.

He served as Washington correspondent for The Village Voice where he worked for 30 years, from the mid-1970s until 2006. He covered politics and foreign affairs including Europe, the Middle East, and the Balkans. In 2012, he would write about his time at the Voice, talking about the independence while he was at the newspaper, "Nobody censored what we wrote. Nobody messed with how things were written, or dreamed of questioning a political opinion." On April 13, 2006's Democracy Now! broadcast, Ridgeway told host Amy Goodman that Michael Lacey, the new executive editor of the Voice, "killed my column, and he asked me to submit ideas for articles to him one by one, which I did, and which he either ignored or turned down, except in one case ... they won't say that I'm fired. I'm supposedly laid off."

Following his departure from the Voice, Ridgeway was hired by Mother Jones to run its Washington, DC bureau. He continued working for the magazine until 2012. His topics included the demise of the social safety net, the racist far right's response to the election of Barack Obama, and the case of the Angola 3, three Black men held in solitary confinement for decades in Louisiana.

In 2008, he covered the Democratic primary elections, filmed interviewing Mike Gravel in New Hampshire, in which Gravel is interviewed on the phone by Neal Conan for NPR's, Talk of the Nation.

In 2009, together with longtime editor and collaborator Jean Casella, Ridgeway founded Solitary Watch, a nonprofit watchdog project that exposes the widespread use of solitary confinement and other abusive conditions in U.S. prisons, jails, and detention facilities. Solitary Watch was the first media project devoted to the topic, and helped bring the largely hidden practice to the attention of the public and larger media outlets. He received a 2012 Soros Justice Media Fellowship, a 2013 Media for a Just Society Award, and a 2014 Alicia Patterson Fellowship for his reporting on prisons. In 2016, the New Yorker's Jennifer Gonnerman wrote a piece titled "James Ridgeway's Solitary Reporting", about his work at Solitary Watch and the extensive correspondence he maintained with people held in solitary confinement. He was also extensively interviewed for An Unreasonable Man, a 2007 documentary about Ralph Nader.

In a career spanning six decades, he covered many topics including automobile safety, far-right activities including the Ku Klux Klan and Neo-Nazism, and campaigns against solitary confinement. His articles have appeared in The New York Times, The New York Review of Books, Parade, Harper's, The Nation, Dollars & Sense, The Economist, The New York Times Magazine, The Wall Street Journal and other magazines and newspapers.

== Personal life ==
Ridgeway married Patricia Carol Dodge, an editor with The New Republic, in 1966. The couple went on to have a son. Ridgeway died on February 13, 2021, in Washington, D.C., at the age of 84.

== Works ==
Ridgeway was the author and editor of twenty books on domestic and foreign affairs, including The Closed Corporation: American Universities in Crisis; The Politics of Ecology; and, more recently, The 5 Unanswered Questions About 9/11: What the 9/11 Commission Report Failed to Tell Us; The Haiti Files: Decoding the Crisis; Yugoslavia's Ethnic Nightmare (a collection co-edited with Jasminka Udovicki); A Pocket Guide to Environmental Bad Guys (with Jeffrey St. Clair); and Blood in the Face: The Ku Klux Klan, Aryan Nations, Nazi Skinheads, the Rise of a New White Culture. He wrote the text for Red Light: Inside the Sex Industry, with photographs by Sylvia Plachy. Together with Jean Casella and Sarah Shourd, he also co-edited the first anthology of writing from solitary confinement, Hell Is a Very Small Place, published in 2016. Ridgeway co-directed the companion film Blood in the Face, as well as Feed, a documentary on the 1992 presidential campaign.

A revised edition of his book Blood in the Face covering the events from 2010s is planned to launch in mid-2021.

- Ridgeway, James (2021). Blood in the Face. Haymarket Books. ISBN 978-1-64259-507-9.
- Casella, Jean; Ridgeway, James; Shourd, Sarah, eds. (September 2017). Hell Is a Very Small Place; Voices from Solitary Confinement (Paper ed.). The New Press. ISBN 978-1-62097-351-6.
- Roos, Philip D.; Ridgeway, James (1969). "The Closed Corporation: American Universities in Crisis". American Sociological Review. 34 (5): 786. doi:10.2307/2092359. ISSN 0003-1224. JSTOR 2092359.
- Ridgeway, James (1970). The politics of ecology. Dutton. ISBN 0-525-18108-3. OCLC 96736.
- Udovicki, Jasminka; Ridgeway, James (2000). Burn This House: The Making and Unmaking of Yugoslavia. Duke University Press. ISBN 978-0-8223-2590-1.
- Ridgeway, James, Blood in the face, OCLC 891108999
- Ridgeway, James (1996). Red Light: Inside the Sex Industry. Powerhouse Books. ISBN 978-1-57687-000-6.
