= Murder by Family =

2008 book by Kent Whitaker

- First edition
- Author: Kent Whitaker
- Cover artist: Cover photo of Whitaker Family by Charles Foster, Jacket design by LUCAS Art & Design, Jenison, Michigan
- Language: English
- Genre: Non-fiction, Memoir, True crime
- Publisher: Howard Books
- Publication date: September 23, 2008
- Publication place: United States
- Media type: print
- Pages: 224
- ISBN: 978-1-4165-7813-0
- LC Class: BV4529.17.W53 2008

Murder by Family is a non-fiction true crime book written by Kent Whitaker. The book was released on September 23, 2008, by Howard Books.

== Synopsis ==
Murder by Family chronicles Thomas Bartlett Whitaker's attempts to have a hitman murder his parents and brother. His mother Tricia and brother Kevin died in the shootings on 10 December 2003, but his father Kent, though shot, survived.

The book follows Kent Whitaker's spiritual journey of healing and forgiveness for his son. Kent tells of also forgiving his son's two accomplices: Chris Brashear, the hitman and Steve Champagne, his getaway driver.

== Aftermath ==
Kent now has a Christian ministry with his wife Tanya Youngling and speaks to organizations about forgiveness and healing.

Thomas Bartlett Whitaker was refused a plea bargain by the District Attorney in return for his admission of guilt and was sentenced to death in 2007. Kent pleaded in vain with the jury to spare Bart's life. In February 2018, his death sentence was overturned one hour before his scheduled execution and he is serving life in prison without the possibility of parole.
