= Hell Is a Very Small Place =

2016 book on solitary confinement

- Front cover
- Editors: Jean Casella, James Ridgeway and Sarah Shourd
- Genre: Non-fiction
- Publisher: Solitary Watch
- Publication date: February 2, 2016
- Publication place: United States
- Pages: 240
- ISBN: 9781620973516

Hell Is a Very Small Place: Voices from Solitary Confinement is an American collection of essays by people who have experienced solitary confinement and by academics giving their perspectives on the topic. It was published in 2016 by The New Press in collaboration with Solitary Watch, a website which collects personal stories about solitary confinement. The editors were James Ridgeway, Jean Casella and Sarah Shourd. The former United Nations special rapporteur Juan E. Méndez wrote an afterword for the book.

The essays explore the circumstances under which people are sent to solitary, their restricted autonomy in such a state and the psychological consequences of prolonged confinement. One contributor, William Blake, was denied access to a copy of the book while in prison. The book received a positive critical reception.

== Background ==
The book was edited by the two founders of Solitary Watch, Jean Casella and James Ridgeway, and the journalist Sarah Shourd. Shourd spent over a year in solitary confinement in Iran. Solitary Watch aims to raise public awareness of solitary confinement through firsthand recollections. The New Press published the book on February 2, 2016.

Some parts of the book are adapted from articles published on Solitary Watch. The contributor William Blake's story drew several hundred thousand website views, despite the average website viewership of 2,000 per day at the time. Subsequent to the book's publishing, Blake was denied access to a copy at the Great Meadow Correctional Facility by the Facility Media Review Committee, who concluded that it "incites disobedience towards law enforcement officers or prison personnel, presents clear and immediate risk of lawlessness, violence, anarchy, or rebellion against governmental authority". The committee flagged 14 pages of the book as unsuitable, including three of Blake's own writing.

== Synopsis ==
There is a preface by Shourd and an introduction by Casella and Ridgeway. The first section, "Voices from Solitary Confinement", contains 16 essays by people who have experienced the practice under the categories "Enduring", "Resisting" and "Surviving". William Blake has spent 29 years in solitary and has never seen a cell phone or used the internet. A 1,400-page handwritten book he was working on was destroyed by guards. Judith Vazquez describes the process of creating a small hole in the rubber in front of her cell's window, by regularly scratching at it until she bled for half a year, in order to inhale the outside air. Uzair Paracha was only permitted newspapers that were over a month old, and no radio or television access.

Barbra Perez is a transgender woman who had been living as a woman for 15 years when she was sent to a male prison and placed in solitary confinement, supposedly for her own protection. She says that she was detained to fill a contractual quota of inmates ICE had with the prison. Galen Baughman said that he had "perhaps the most valuable" subscription to The New York Times "in the world", for the meaning it had to him and the people he would pass it along to. Five Mualimm-ak was released from prison with no notice after the conclusion of a court case, and sent to the hospital by police who found him in a vulnerable state at the bus station. Due to his hospitalization, he did not register for parole within a day, so was sent back to prison.

The second section, "Perspectives on Solitary Confinement", contains five analytic essays by a lawyer, two legal scholars and two psychiatrists. Terry Kupers writes about psychological effects of solitary, such as the feeling that walls are moving in on the subject, and a compulsion to disobey guards' orders so as to increase their interaction time. Laura Rovner believes that "the law follows societal opinion", in contrast to societal opinion following law on many other topics. Jeanne Theoharis argues that "torture resounds in isolation" rather than direct violence.

An afterword is written by Juan E. Méndez, a former United Nations special rapporteur on Torture and Other Cruel, Inhuman or Degrading Treatment or Punishment. Méndez says that the best estimate for the number of people in the United States in solitary confinement at any moment is 80,000, but the figure is unknown.

== Analysis ==
A 2011 United Nations report compiled by the committee led by Méndez recommended ending almost all solitary confinement of longer than 15 days, which Méndez categorized as torture. Bryan Schatz of Mother Jones wrote that "Reading this collection of essays by people who have experienced solitary confinement, it's not hard to see why" Méndez concluded this. Los Angeles Review of Books's Stephen Lurie noted that the experiences collected are from people whose solitary confinement did not destroy their ability to communicate with language. Lurie found the book's existence to be "a minor act of rebellion", writing that the stories have "outlasted" or "escaped" the "regimes that systematically attempt to suppress communication of them".

Scott McLemee of Inside Higher Ed compared the title to the line "Hell is other people" from Jean-Paul Sartre's play No Exit, which refers to the characters' "desperate and insurmountable need to connect with other people". McLemee found the situation of solitary confinement worse than Sartre's depiction of Hell, due to the smaller space and almost total absence of human interaction.

== Reception ==
For Publishers Weekly, Heather Ann Thompson chose Hell Is a Very Small Place as her favorite book of 2016. Thompson wrote that though it "is not a book anyone will want to read ... people of conscience must read and share" and that the stories "inspire us to act". Martin Garbus, writing in The New York Review of Books, praised it as an "unforgettable look at the peculiar horrors and humiliations" of the subject matter. Garbus found that the content reflected poorly on the prison system and was even "an indictment of America". He praised of the prisoners that "their voices remain those of observant people with distinctive and varied responses to their confinement".

A Kirkus Reviews journalist found that the book manages to "dig deep into the frailties of the human mind as well as the savagery of the American penal system and its ilk". They praised the "undeniable efficacy" in the editors' arguments and the writing style of the academics. Additionally, they found that though some experiences recounted are "soul-deadening", others are "startlingly articulate and unnervingly funny, despite the violence and grief".

McLemee found that the reading process "leaves one with the horrible feeling of being overpowered by routines and forces that will just keep running from the sheer force of momentum". He said that the chapters become repetitive, albeit that this "could hardly be otherwise". Lurie thought the book was "crucial" to public awareness of solitary confinement, and that it gives "visceral human form to the practice". Lurie suggested an improved structure to the book would have interspersed academic perspectives with essays about people's experiences.
