= Solitary confinement =

Strict form of imprisonment

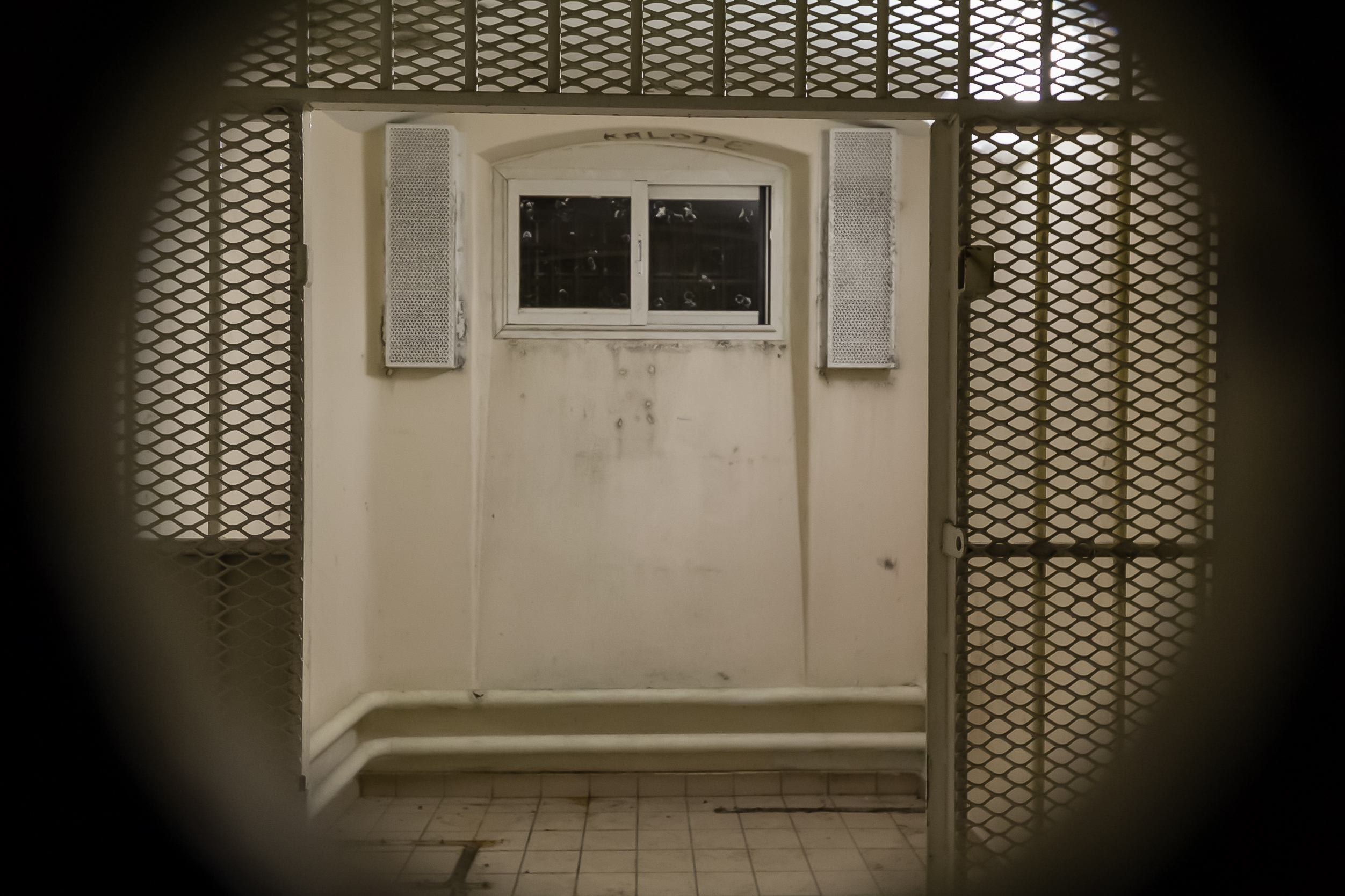
Solitary confinement cell in Jacques-Cartier Prison in Rennes, France

Solitary confinement (also shortened to solitary) is a form of imprisonment in which an incarcerated person lives in a single cell with little or no contact with other people. It is a punitive tool used within the prison system to discipline or separate incarcerated individuals who are considered to be security risks to other incarcerated individuals or prison staff, as well as those who violate facility rules or are deemed disruptive. However, it can also be used as protective custody for incarcerated individuals whose safety is threatened by other prisoners. This is employed to separate them from the general prison population and prevent injury or death.

A robust body of research has shown that solitary confinement has profound negative psychological, physical, and neurological effects on those who experience it, often lasting well beyond one's time in solitary. While corrections officials have stated that solitary confinement is a necessary tool for maintaining the safety and security of prisons and jails, numerous medical, mental health, and legal professional organizations have criticized the practice and hold the view that it should be sharply curtailed. Due to the negative connotation around the term "solitary confinement", alternative terms are now used interchangeably: administrative segregation, restrictive housing, and close management (level 1).

Nelson Mandela, the South African anti-apartheid activist, described solitary confinement as "the most forbidding aspect of prison life". Human rights experts have stated that prolonged solitary confinement may amount to torture, and the United Nations Standard Minimum Rules for the Treatment of Prisoners (known as the Mandela Rules) were revised in 2015 to prohibit placements in solitary for longer than 15 days.

== History ==
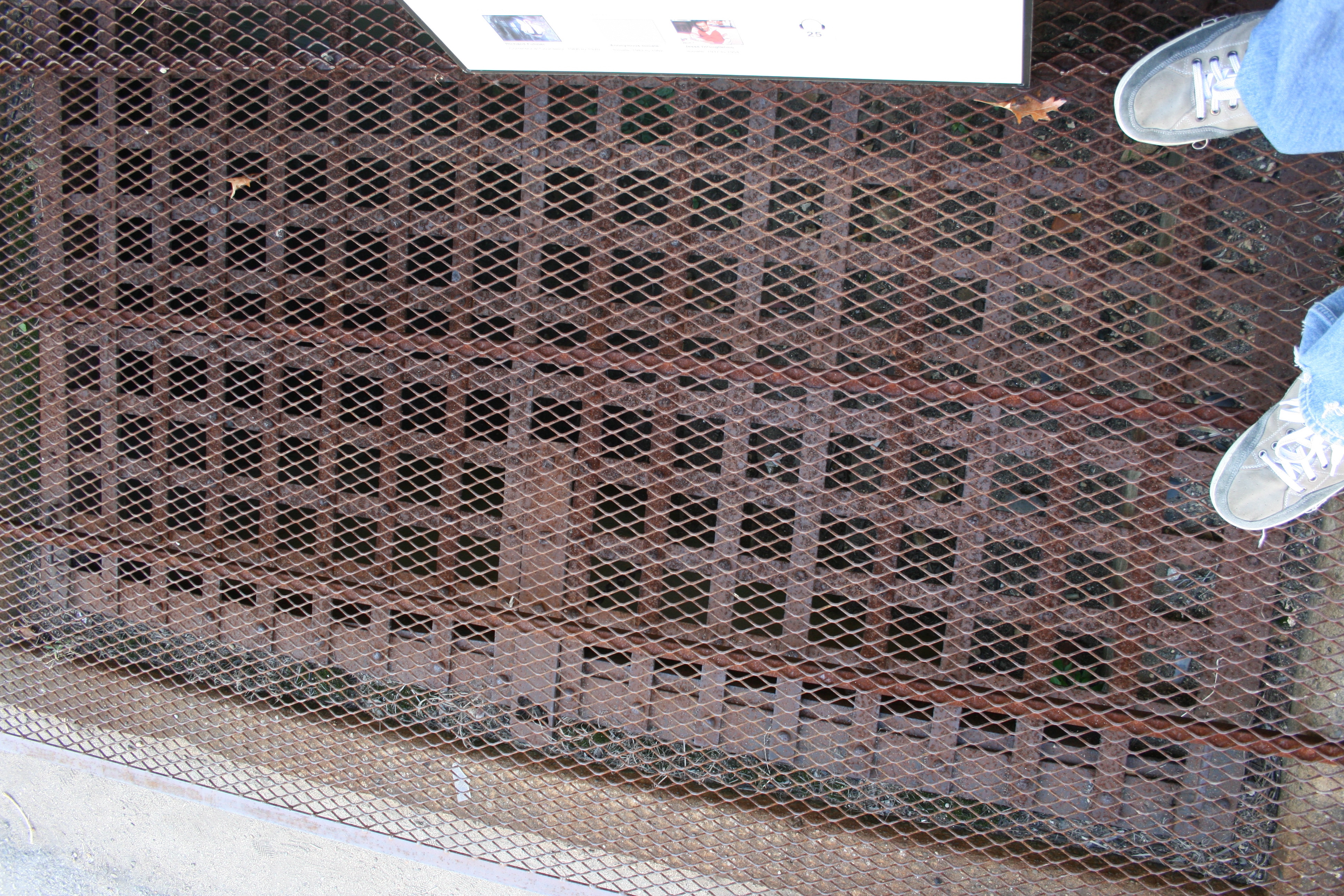
Subterranean cells at Eastern State Penitentiary, Philadelphia

The practice of solitary confinement in the United States traces its origins to the late 18th century, when Quakers in Pennsylvania used the method as a substitution for public punishments. Research surrounding the possible psychological and physiological effects of solitary dates back to the 1830s. When the new prison discipline of separate confinement was introduced at Eastern State Penitentiary as part of the "Pennsylvania" or separate system in 1829, commentators attributed the high rate of mental breakdown to the system of isolating prisoners in their cells. Charles Dickens, who visited the Philadelphia Penitentiary during his travels to America, described the "slow and daily tampering with the mysteries of the brain to be immeasurably worse than any torture of the body."

The Supreme Court of the United States made its first comment about the deleterious effects of solitary confinement in 1890, noting that the use of solitary led to reduced mental and physical capabilities (In re Medley 134 U.S. 160). Records from Danish prisons between 1870 and 1920 indicate that individuals in solitary confinement there had also experienced signs of acute mental distress, including anxiety, paranoia, and hallucinations.

The use of solitary confinement increased greatly during the COVID-19 pandemic in response to the rising prevalence of the virus inside prisons and jails. Many correctional facilities were locked down for up to 23 hours a day, confining people in their cells with no programming, phone access, or human contact. In the United States alone, more than 300,000 incarcerated people were held in virus-related lockdowns during the early months of the pandemic.

== Purpose ==
=== Extracting confessions ===
Solitary confinement is often used to induce a confession from a prisoner in pre-trial detention. This practice has been more common in Denmark and other Scandinavian countries in the twentieth and twenty-first centuries.

=== Protective custody ===
Solitary confinement is used on incarcerated individuals when they are considered a danger to themselves or others. It is also used on individuals who are at high risk of being harmed by others, for example because they are transgender, have served as a witness to a crime, or have been convicted of crimes such as child molestation or abuse. This latter form of isolation is known as protective custody, and can be either voluntary or involuntary.

Though proponents of solitary have often expressed the belief that solitary confinement promotes safety in correctional facilities, there is substantial evidence that points to the contrary. In 2002, the Commission on Safety and Abuse in America, chaired by John Joseph Gibbons and Nicholas Katzenbach, found that "the increasing use of high-security segregation is counter-productive, often causing violence inside facilities and contributing to recidivism after release."

Shira E. Gordon has argued that solitary confinement "has not come close to solving the very problem it was meant to reduce: prison violence." In support of this view, Gordon cites a 2012 study showing that the rate of violence in California prisons is 20 percent higher than it was in 1989, when California's first supermax prison opened. Gordon also cites the Northern District of California court in Toussaint v. McCarthy, which found that solitary confinement "increase[d] rather than decrease[d] antisocial tendencies among inmates" at Folsom and San Quentin State Prisons in California.

=== Punishment ===
Solitary confinement is also commonly used as punishment for those who have violated prison rules or committed other disciplinary infractions. The practice is the norm in super-maximum security (supermax) prisons, where individuals who are deemed dangerous or high risk are held.

=== Suppressing protest ===
Critics allege solitary confinement has been used to punish and suppress organizing, activism, and other political activities in prisons. In immigration detention centers, reports have surfaced that immigrant detainees are being placed in solitary to keep those knowledgeable about their rights away from other detainees. Individuals who go on hunger strike to protest poor conditions in immigration facilities are also frequently placed in solitary. Although immigration officials have claimed that their policy of isolating hunger strikers is for the protection of the detained person, medical and legal experts have pointed out that there is no medical basis behind the policy, and that, in the United States, it constitutes a violation of the detainee's First Amendment rights.

Solitary confinement is similarly used as retaliation in prisons and jails, including against whistleblowers who raise awareness of inhumane conditions and jailhouse lawyers who assist others in litigating their rights. There have been further reports of people being placed in solitary based on their race, religion, or sexual orientation.

== By country or region ==
=== Europe ===
While solitary confinement is less commonplace in Europe than in other parts of the world including the United States, it is still widely used in many European countries today.

The European Court of Human Rights distinguishes between complete sensory isolation, total social isolation and relative social isolation and notes that "complete sensory isolation, coupled with total social isolation can destroy the personality and constitutes a form of inhuman treatment which cannot be justified by the requirements of security or any other reason. On the other hand, the prohibition of contacts with other prisoners for security, disciplinary or protective reasons does not in itself amount to inhuman treatment or punishment."

The European Committee for the Prevention of Torture, or CPT, defines solitary confinement as "whenever a prisoner is ordered to be held separately from other prisoners, for example, as a result of court decision, as a disciplinary sanction imposed within the prison system, as a preventive administrative measure or for the protection of the prisoner concerned." The CPT "considers that solitary confinement should only be imposed in exceptional circumstances, as a last resort and for the shortest possible time."

==== Iceland ====
Iceland has faced criticism for decades over its extensive use of pre-trial solitary confinement. A 2023 report by Amnesty International documented that 61 percent of pre-trial detainees had spent time in solitary confinement in 2021; of those detained that year, 57 percent were foreign nationals, a percentage far higher than the percentage of foreign nationals in Iceland (around 14 percent of the population in 2021).

==== Italy ====
Italian prisoners subject to special surveillance ("41-bis regime") may be in de facto solitary confinement. A person sentenced to multiple life sentences in Italy may be required by the Minister of Justice to serve a period of between 6 months to years in the "41-bis regime" of solitary confinement, subject to extension and review.

==== United Kingdom ====
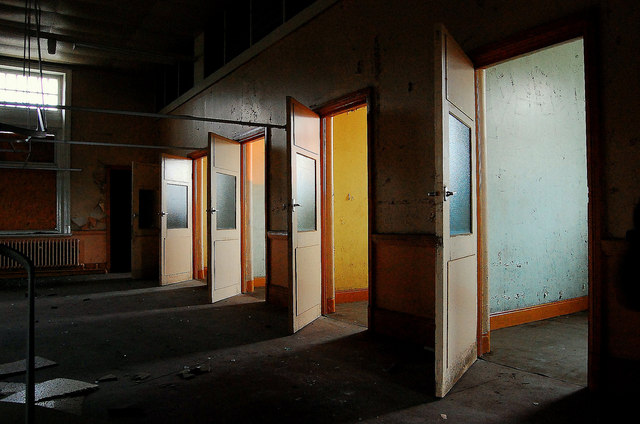
Solitary confinement cells at High Royds Hospital, Menston, West Yorkshire

In 2015, segregation (solitary confinement) was used 7,889 times. 54 out of 85,509 prisoners held in England and Wales in 2015 were placed in solitary confinement cells in Close Supervision Centres (Shalev & Edgar, 2015:149), England and Wales' version of the US 'Supermax'.

The use of solitary confinement on juveniles and children, as elsewhere, has been a subject of contention. Critics argue that, in the United Kingdom, the state has a duty to "set the highest standards of care" when it limits the liberties of children. Frances Crook is one of many to believe that incarceration and solitary confinement are the harshest forms of possible punishments and "should only be taken as a last resort". Because children are still mentally developing, Crook writes, incarceration should not encourage them to commit more violent crimes.

The penal system has been cited as failing to protect juveniles in custody. In the United Kingdom, 29 children died in penal custody between 1990 and 2006: "Some 41% of the children in custody were officially designated as being vulnerable". That is attributed to the fact that isolation and physical restraint are used as the first response to punish them for simple rule infractions. Moreover, Frances Crook argues that these punitive policies not only violate their basic rights but also leave the children mentally unstable and left with illnesses that are often ignored. Overall, the solitary confinement of youth is considered to be counterproductive because the "restrictive environment... and intense regulation of children" aggravates them, instead of addressing the issue of rehabilitation.

Solitary confinement is colloquially referred to in British English as "the block", "The Segregation Unit" or "the cooler".

=== Iran ===
In Iran, white torture (Persian: شكنجه سفيد) has been practiced on political prisoners by the Islamic republic regime. Most political prisoners who experience this type of torture are journalists held in the Evin prison. According to Hadi Ghaemi, founder of the Center for Human Rights in Iran (CHRI), such tortures in Evin are not necessarily authorized directly by the Iranian government.

It can include prolonged periods of solitary confinement, the use of continual illumination to deprive sleep (listed in the Geneva Convention on Basic Human Rights, 1949), often in detention centers outside the control of the prison authorities, including Section 209 of Evin Prison.

Ahmed Shaheed, the United Nations special human rights rapporteur in Iran, claimed that human rights activist Vahid Asghari was psychologically tortured by means of long-term detention in solitary confinement and with threats to arrest, torture or rape his family members. He was also reportedly tortured with severe beatings for the purpose of eliciting confessions.

A 2004 Amnesty International report documented the use of white torture on Amir Fakhravar by the Revolutionary Guards, the first known example of white torture in Iran. It states that "his cells had no windows, and the walls and his clothes were white. His meals consisted of white rice on white plates. To use the toilet, he had to put a white piece of paper under the door. He was forbidden to speak, and the guards reportedly wore shoes that muffled sound".

In a telephone call to the Human Rights Watch in 2004, the Iranian journalist Ebrahim Nabavi said:

Since I left Evin, I have not been able to sleep without sleeping pills. It is terrible. The loneliness never leaves you, long after you are "free". Every door that is closed on you ... This is why we call it "white torture". They get what they want without having to hit you. They know enough about you to control the information that you get: they can make you believe that the president has resigned, that they have your wife, that someone you trust has told them lies about you. You begin to break. And once you break, they have control. And then you begin to confess.

=== United States ===
Solitary confinement first arose in the United States in the late 1700s among religious groups like the Quakers, who thought isolation would promote repentance and rehabilitation. Though the practice fell out of use in the early 1900s, it experienced a resurgence during the tough on crime era in the 1980s and 1990s. This period also saw the construction of supermax prisons, which typically house individuals in indefinite solitary confinement consisting of upwards of 22 hours a day of isolation.

In the United States penal system today, more than 20 percent of individuals in state and federal prisons and 18 percent of individuals in local jails are placed in solitary confinement or another form of restrictive housing at some point during their incarceration. According to a 2023 report from Solitary Watch and Unlock the Box, it is estimated that more than 122,000 people are held in solitary confinement in state and federal prisons and local jails in the United States on any given day. A report from the Liman Center at Yale Law School found that between 41,000 and 48,000 individuals were held daily in solitary confinement in state and federal prisons for 15 days or more in 2021, with over 6,000 individuals found to have been held in solitary for over a year.

Since 2009, there have been legislative efforts in numerous states to ban the use of solitary confinement for vulnerable populations, including children, pregnant women, and LGBTQ+ people, as well as to end the use of long-term solitary confinement. In 2020, New Jersey passed the Isolated Confinement Restriction Act, which bans the use of solitary beyond 20 consecutive days. As of June 2023, New York, Connecticut, and Nevada have passed legislation banning the use of solitary beyond 15 consecutive days, bringing their use of isolation in line with the United Nations' Mandela Rules.

In July 2023, United States Representative Cori Bush (D-Mo.) introduced the End Solitary Confinement Act, which would prohibit solitary confinement except for up to a four-hour maximum in all federal prisons, jails, and immigration detention centers if passed. The bill would also incentivize similar legislation to be enacted at the state and local levels.

==== Racial and other disparities ====
Statistics indicate that members of marginalized groups are disproportionately likely to end up in solitary confinement. A 2019 Correctional Leaders Association/Yale Law School study found that Black women make up 21.5 percent of the United States female prison population, but 42.1 percent of the U.S. female prison population held in solitary. Another study found that 11 percent of all Black men born in Pennsylvania between 1986 and 1989 had been held in solitary by the age of 32. Disparities in the use of solitary have also been found to exist for LGBTQ+ people, Latinos, and Native Americans.

The disproportionate use of solitary on marginalized groups has been attributed to racism and other forms of discrimination which are exacerbated by the correctional environment. People of color may be more likely to be perceived as threatening and consequently receive more disciplinary tickets that land them in solitary; LGBTQ+ individuals may be placed in solitary as protective custody (either voluntarily or involuntarily) to prevent them from being assaulted or otherwise victimized. Notably, some transgender individuals have stated that they would rather risk their safety in the general prison population than being held in the isolation of protective custody.

Angela J. Hattery and Earl Smith have written, "Solitary confinement is a place where [the] racial history [of the United States] is on full display... Not only are the majority of the staff white and the majority of the prisoners Black and brown, but the very premise of solitary confinement relies on the foundation of white supremacy on which this country was built."

=== Venezuela ===
The headquarters for the Bolivarian Intelligence Service (SEBIN) in Plaza Venezuela, Caracas, have an underground detention facility that has been dubbed La Tumba (The Tomb). The facility is located at the place that the underground parking for the Metro Caracas was to be located. The cells are two by three meters that have a cement bed, white walls, security cameras, no windows, and barred doors, with cells aligned next to one another so that there is no interaction between prisoners. Such conditions have caused prisoners to become very ill, but they are denied medical treatment. Bright lights in the cells are kept on so that prisoners lose their sense of time, with the only sounds heard being from the nearby Caracas Metro trains. Those who visit the prisoners are subjected to strip searches by multiple SEBIN personnel.

Allegations of torture in La Tumba, specifically white torture, are also common, with some prisoners attempting suicide. Those conditions according to the NGO Justice and Process are intended to make prisoners plead guilty to the crimes that they are accused of.

== Effects ==
=== Psychological ===
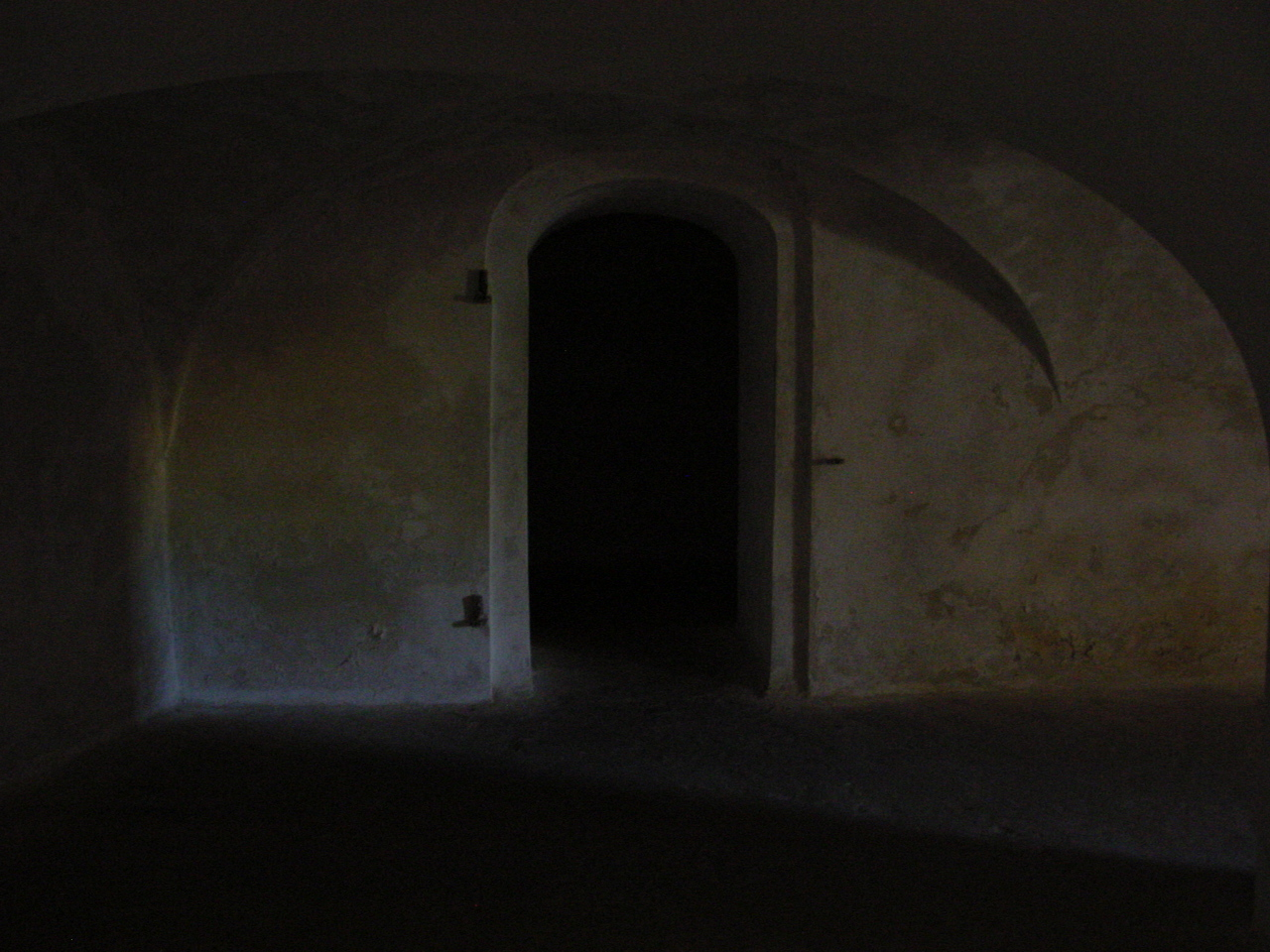
Solitary confinement cell at Fort Christiansværn, United States Virgin Islands

Solitary confinement has been associated with significant negative effects on mental health. Research indicates that the psychological effects of solitary confinement may encompass a range of adverse symptoms including "anxiety, depression, anger, cognitive disturbances, perceptual distortions, obsessive thoughts, paranoia, and psychosis." These symptoms are so widespread among individuals held in solitary that some psychiatrists have labeled them "SHU Syndrome," with SHU standing for Special Housing Unit or Security Housing Unit. In a 1983 journal article, Stuart Grassian described SHU Syndrome as a "major, clinically distinguishable psychiatric syndrome." Grassian notes solitary confinement can cause extremely vivid hallucinations in multiple sensory modalities including visual, auditory, tactile, olfactory. Some other effects include dissociative features including amnesia, motor excitement with aimless violence and delusions.

For those who enter the prison system already diagnosed with a mental illness, solitary confinement can significantly worsen their condition. Incarcerated individuals with mental health conditions often "decompensate in isolation, requiring crisis care or psychiatric hospitalization." The lack of human contact and sensory deprivation that characterize solitary confinement have been shown to cause permanent or semi-permanent changes to brain physiology. Alterations to brain physiology can lead individuals to commit suicide or self-harm.

==== Self-harm ====
A major issue within the prison system in general, and solitary confinement in particular, is the high number of incarcerated individuals who turn to self-harm. Such self-harm can include, but is not limited to, cutting, head-banging, and swallowing foreign objects.

A 2014 study of New York City jail admissions published in the American Journal of Public Health found that, after controlling for length of jail stay, age, race/ethnicity, and mental illness status, individuals placed in solitary confinement were 6.9 times more likely to commit self-harm and 6.3 times more likely to commit potentially fatal self-harm than the general jail population. While 7.3 percent of jail stays included any time in solitary, 53.3 percent of acts of self-harm and 45 percent of acts of potentially fatal self harm took place among people who had spent time in solitary during their stay.

Incarcerated individuals who attempt self-harm or suicide are often placed on suicide watch, an intensive form of isolation and monitoring often in a room with few if any furnishings. While on suicide watch, individuals are typically denied clothing and bedding (to prevent them from hanging themselves using bedsheets), as well as denied programming and contact visits. Though these conditions are intended to prevent individuals from committing suicide, they often exacerbate trauma and other pre-existing mental health conditions. Despite controls in place, individuals in suicide watch cells have still found ways to harm themselves.

=== Physical ===
Solitary confinement has been reported to cause hypertension, headaches, profuse sweating, dizziness, and heart palpitations. Many individuals in solitary experience extreme weight loss due to digestion complications and abdominal pain. They can also develop neck and back pain and muscle stiffness due to long periods of little to no physical activity. These symptoms have been linked to the intense anxiety and sensory deprivation caused by isolation, and often worsen with repeated visits to solitary.

Studies have shown that solitary confinement also has a marked effect on the human brain. fMRI scans have found that social isolation causes brain activity nearly identical to hunger cravings, and that it activates the same regions of the brain as physical pain. Furthermore, the sensory deprivation of solitary has been found to cause reduced electroencephalography (EEG) frequency on brain scans. The part of the brain that plays a major role in memory has been shown to physically shrink after long periods without human interaction. One study that placed adult rats in solitary-like conditions found that, after a month in isolation, the rats' neurons had shrunk by 20 percent.

=== Social ===
Some sociologists argue that prisons create a unique social environment that do not allow individuals to create strong social ties inside or outside of the facility. The social isolation that incarcerated individuals experience is especially acute in solitary confinement, where they may be denied access to phone calls, mail, and visits from loved ones.

The psychological effects of isolation continue long after individuals are released from solitary, affecting society as a whole. Upon their reentry into society, many individuals who have spent long periods of time in solitary report having difficulty adjusting back to life outside the prison walls. They are often startled easily, and avoid crowds and public spaces. They seek out small, confined spaces because public areas overwhelm their sensory stimulation.

Anthony Graves, who spent more than 18 years in solitary confinement on the Texas death row before being exonerated in 2010, described the lasting effects of solitary in his testimony for the US Senate Judiciary Subcommittee on the Constitution, Civil Rights, and Human Rights:

Solitary confinement does one thing, it breaks a man's will to live and he ends up deteriorating. He's never the same person again… I have been free for almost two years and I still cry at night, because no one out here can relate to what I have gone through. I battle with feelings of loneliness. I've tried therapy but it didn't work. The therapist was crying more than me. She couldn't believe that our system was putting men through this sort of inhumane treatment.

According to numerous studies, any amount of time in solitary confinement can increase the risk of recidivism after release. A 2007 matched case–control study of Washington State prisons found that people in the study cohort who spent time in supermax prisons had a 3-year felony recidivism rate of 53 percent, which was 15 percent higher than that of their counterparts in the general prison population. The recidivism rate was even higher among people who were released directly from supermax into the community, at 69 percent.

== Legality ==
The legality of solitary confinement has been frequently challenged over the past sixty years as conceptions surrounding the practice have changed. Much of the legal discussion concerning solitary confinement has centered on whether or not it constitutes torture or cruel and unusual punishment. While international law has generally begun to discourage solitary confinement's use in penal institutions, opponents of solitary confinement have been less successful at challenging it within the United States legal system.

United Nations Special Rapporteurs on Torture Manfred Nowak and Juan Méndez have "repeatedly and unequivocally stated that prolonged solitary confinement is cruel, inhuman or degrading treatment, and may amount to torture," though their statements are not primary sources in international law.

A 2005 law journal article argued America's detention system is far below the basic minimum standards for treatment of prisoners under international law and has caused an international human rights concern: "U.S. solitary confinement practices contravene international treaty law, violate established international norms, and do not represent sound foreign policy."

=== Torture ===
Critics of solitary confinement regard the practice as a form of psychological torture with measurable physiological effects, particularly when the period of confinement is longer than a few weeks or is continued indefinitely.

In October 2011, attorney and activist Juan E. Méndez, then the United Nations Special Rapporteur on Torture and Other Cruel, Inhuman or Degrading Treatment or Punishment, called on all countries to eliminate the practice except in "very exceptional circumstances and for as short a time as possible," with a complete ban for juveniles and individuals with mental disabilities. "Solitary confinement is a harsh measure which is contrary to rehabilitation," Méndez told the General Assembly's Third Committee, which deals with social, humanitarian, and cultural affairs. He continued: "Considering the severe mental pain or suffering solitary confinement may cause, it can amount to torture or cruel, inhuman or degrading treatment or punishment when used as a punishment, during pre-trial detention, indefinitely or for a prolonged period, for persons with mental disabilities or juveniles."

The United Nations Committee Against Torture cited use of solitary confinement in the United States as excessive and a violation of the Convention Against Torture in 2014. The United Nations' "Mandela Rules", which were adopted in 2015 and establish minimum standards for the treatment of prisoners, prohibit placements in solitary beyond 15 consecutive days.

In Detention and Torture in South Africa: Psychological, Legal, and Historical Studies, psychologist Don Foster lists solitary confinement as one of the most common forms of torture used on South African detainees. "Given the full context of dependency, helplessness and social isolation common to conditions of South African security law detention," Foster writes, "there can be little doubt that solitary confinement under these circumstances should in itself be regarded as a form of torture."

=== Ethics ===
The harsh effects of solitary confinement on the individuals who experience it, particularly those diagnosed with mental illness, have led many to view the practice as cruel and unethical.

In an article for Journal of the American Academy of Psychiatry and the Law, Jeffrey Metzner and Jamie Fellner write that solitary confinement may constitute a violation of medical ethics. As the authors note, healthcare professionals are "ethically obligated to refrain from countenancing, condoning, participating in, or facilitating torture or other forms of cruel, inhuman, or degrading treatment," yet human rights experts have stated that solitary confinement may amount to such treatment. "It is not ethically defensible for health care professionals to acquiesce silently to conditions of confinement that inflict mental harm and violate human rights," they write.

Metzner and Fellner call on physicians not only to provide adequate medical services to individuals in isolation, but to advocate for changes to segregation policies in the facility in which they are employed and to undertake public advocacy to raise awareness of the harms of solitary in society as a whole.

== Protests ==
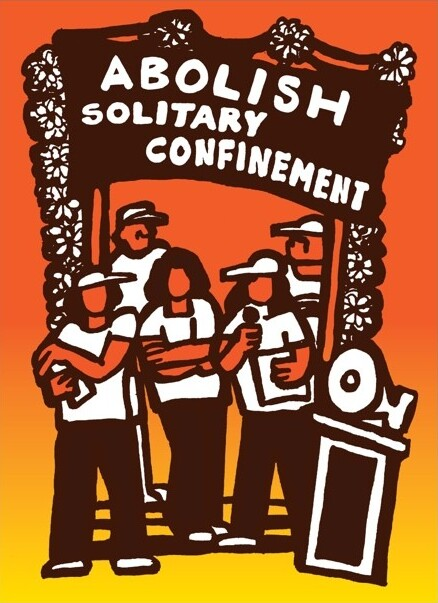
A 2014 solitary confinement abolition poster

For nearly as long as solitary confinement has existed, there have been individuals and organized movements protesting its existence. As early as 1838, Quaker prison reformer Elizabeth Fry traveled throughout England and Scotland to speak to policymakers about the dangers of solitary and to call for a reduction in its use. During the mid- to late-20th century, solitary confinement served as a site of resistance for imprisoned Black radicals. At New York's Attica Correctional Facility, for example, Black Muslims purposely filled restrictive housing units to prevent them from being used punitively against members of the Nation of Islam.

In July 2011, individuals held in Security Housing Units (SHU) at Pelican Bay State Prison began a hunger strike to protest the "torturous conditions" in SHU. The participants also sought to advocate for an end to California's policy of holding alleged gang members in indefinite solitary confinement, as well as the termination of the debriefing process, which compels people in solitary to identify either themselves or others as gang members in order to leave isolation. Over the course of the strike, more than 6,000 incarcerated individuals throughout the California prison system stood in solidarity with the Pelican Bay hunger strikers by refusing food.

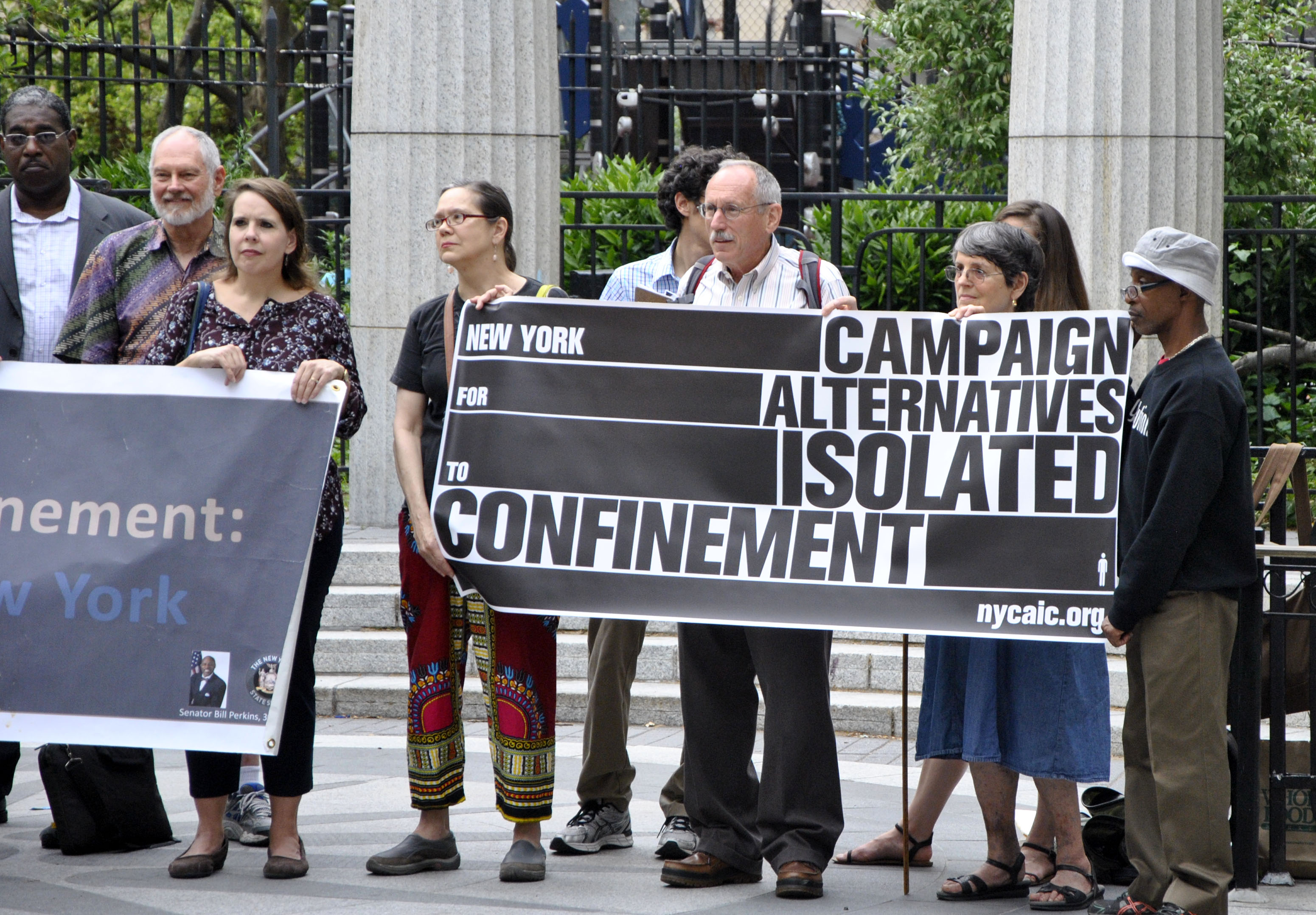
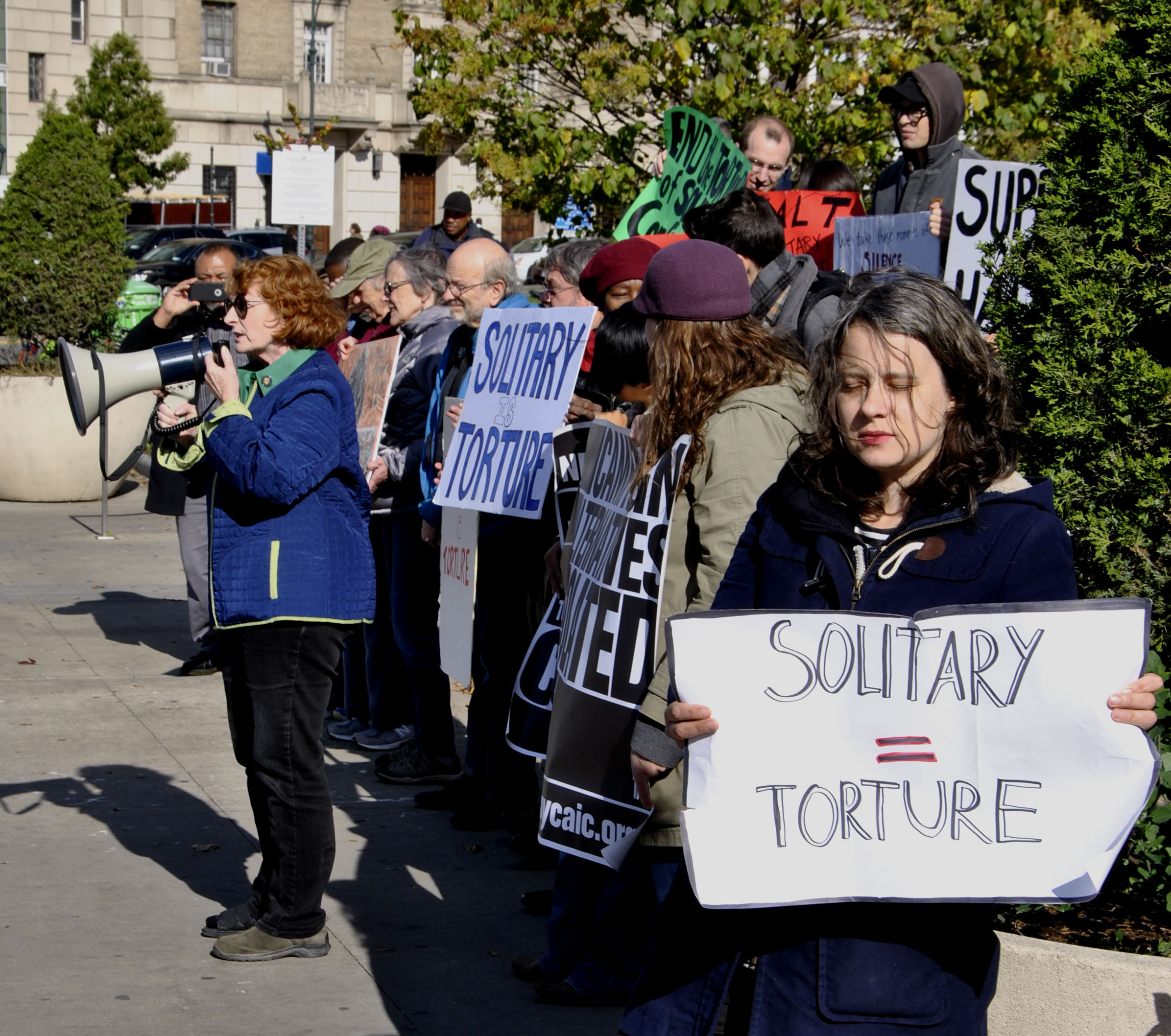
People campaigning against solitary confinement in New York, U.S., in 2016

The men at Pelican Bay organized another strike in 2013, this time drawing 32,000 participants across 33 California prisons. As a result of the strike and subsequent litigation by the Center for Constitutional Rights, the California Department of Corrections and Rehabilitation agreed to end indefinite solitary confinement for all individuals in custody. The Prisoner Hunger Strike Solidarity Coalition, a coalition of grassroots organizations and family members of strike participants, played a key role in raising public awareness for the strikers and their demands.

In the years following the Pelican Bay strikes, incarcerated individuals across the United States have continued to organize for improved prison conditions, including an end to prolonged solitary confinement. In 2022, incarcerated workers in Alabama withheld labor to draw attention to harsh prison conditions and the need for decarceration. In 2023, dozens of incarcerated individuals in Texas went on hunger strike to protest the state's solitary confinement policies. Prison officials in some cases have retaliated against strike participants by sending them to solitary confinement.

== Alternatives and reform ==
In light of the increasing public scrutiny of solitary confinement and its documented effects, corrections leaders, policymakers, and advocates have begun to look to alternatives. The New York City Department of Correction announced in 2013 that it would start transferring individuals with severe mental illness who commit disciplinary infractions to a setting similar to a hospital ward, where they would receive medication and therapy. Those with less severe mental illness who violate facility rules are still placed in solitary, but with increased hours of therapy and a behavioral intervention program.

Another approach that facilities have taken to reduce their reliance on solitary is to restrict the reasons for which people can be sent to solitary in the first place. In 2013, Maine replaced its policy of using solitary as a punishment for every infraction with a system of "informal sanctions" of reductions in privileges, which helped the state cut its then-full supermax population in half. In 2021, Washington State ended its use of disciplinary segregation entirely, stating in a press release that "the agency's data indicates that disciplinary segregation… has not been proven to be an effective sanction or deterrent to negative behavior."

A number of jurisdictions have also enacted legislation prohibiting the use of solitary for vulnerable groups or limiting it to a set number of days for the general prison population. New York's Humane Alternatives to Long-Term (HALT) Solitary Confinement Act prohibits people from being placed in solitary for more than 15 consecutive days, or 20 days in any 60-day period. The legislation also bans placements in solitary for individuals 21 and under or 55 and older; people with physical, medical, or mental disabilities; and people who are pregnant or have recently given birth. Legislative efforts to curb the use of solitary, many of which reflect aspects of HALT, have taken place or are underway in at least 44 other states.

Finally, some corrections agencies have drawn inspiration from European countries such as Norway and Germany for reforming their use of solitary. In these countries, solitary confinement is typically used far less often and for shorter periods of time than in the United States. Norwegian prison cells are also usually more spacious and better furnished compared to their North American counterparts. However, scholars have noted that the experience of solitary confinement in Norway is not necessarily less painful, and have been critical of prison reformists for prioritizing aesthetic sensibilities over the lived experiences of incarcerated people. In 2018, the United Nations Committee against Torture criticised the "high rates of prolonged isolation" of prisoners in Norway, of which it stated, "amounts to solitary confinement".

== See also ==
- Box (form of torture involving solitary confinement in an overheated room)
- Cabin fever
- Discipline and Punish
- Isolation to facilitate abuse
- Prison abolition movement
- Prison control units
- Separate system
- Single-celling
- Solitary Watch
- Suicide watch
- Touch starvation

== Bibliography ==
- Birckhead, T. R. (2015). Children in isolation: The solitary confinement of youth. Wake Forest Law Review 50(1), 1-80.
- Shalev, S. & Edgar, K. (2015). Deep Custody: Segregation Units and Close Supervision Centres in England and Wales. London: Prison Reform Trust.
- Shalev, S. (2009). Supermax : controlling risk through solitary confinement. Cullompton, UK: Willan. ISBN 978-1-84392-409-8.
