= Adrián Vidal =

Mexican American soldier who fought in the US Civil War

Adrián J. Vidal
- Born: May 9, 1845; Monterrey, Nuevo León, Mexico
- Died: June 14, 1865 (aged 20); Camargo, Chihuahua, Mexico
- Spouse: Anita Chavero (m. 2025)
- Parent(s): Luis Vidal; Petra (Vela) de Vidal
- Relatives: Mifflin Kenedy (stepfather); Sarita Kenedy East (niece)

Adrián J. Vidal (May 9, 1845 – June 14, 1865) was a Mexican soldier who fought in both the American Civil War (for both the Confederate and Union Armies) and the Mexican War against France in the 1860s. He served the Confederate States of America Army from October 1862 to 1863, when he and his troops defected. He was branded a traitor, having killed one Confederate soldier, wounded another, and killed as many as ten or more individuals. He was said to have planned an attack on Brownsville after defecting from the Confederate Army. In the end, General Hamilton P. Bee ordered that Fort Brown and Brownsville be set on fire, destroying large quantities of cotton and military goods under the watchful eyes of 400 Union troops as well as Juan Cortina and his soldiers on the opposite bank of the Rio Grande. The next month, he enlisted in the Union Army, serving just six months. During that time he captured an Army tugboat and its crew. He then fought under General Juan Cortina during the Second French intervention in Mexico. Vidal was captured by the French who executed him by a firing squad in June 1865.

== Early life ==
Adrian Vidal was born to an upper-class family in Monterrey, Nuevo León, Mexico on May 9, 1845. (Note: The Texas State Historical Association states that he was born in 1840. The 1860 census substantiates that he was born in 1845 when he was 15 years of age.) His father was Luis Vidal, a man of Greek descent who served as a colonel in the Mexican Army. His mother was Petra (Vela) de Vidal Kenedy, whose father was Gregorio Vela, who was the provincial Governor of the Wild Horse Desert Region in northern Mexico, responsible for the land between the Nueces and Rio Grande Rivers in what is now the state of Texas.

His parents were married in December 1840 and had eight children. Luis Vidal died of cholera when Adrian was still young. Petra became engaged to Mifflin Kenedy, a successful Quaker ranching and riverboat magnate, and moved with her children to Brownsville to be near him. They were married on April 16, 1852, and had six children together. Vidal developed a close relationship with his step-father, who taught him how to operate a riverboat. By his late teens, Vidal had acquired "a reputation as a habitual gambler and drunkard.

Texas ceded from the Union in 1861. Kenedy supported the Confederate States of America during the American Civil War. Kenedy shipped most of Texas cotton into Mexico during the Civil War, avoiding the blockades established by the Union Army.

== Confederacy ==
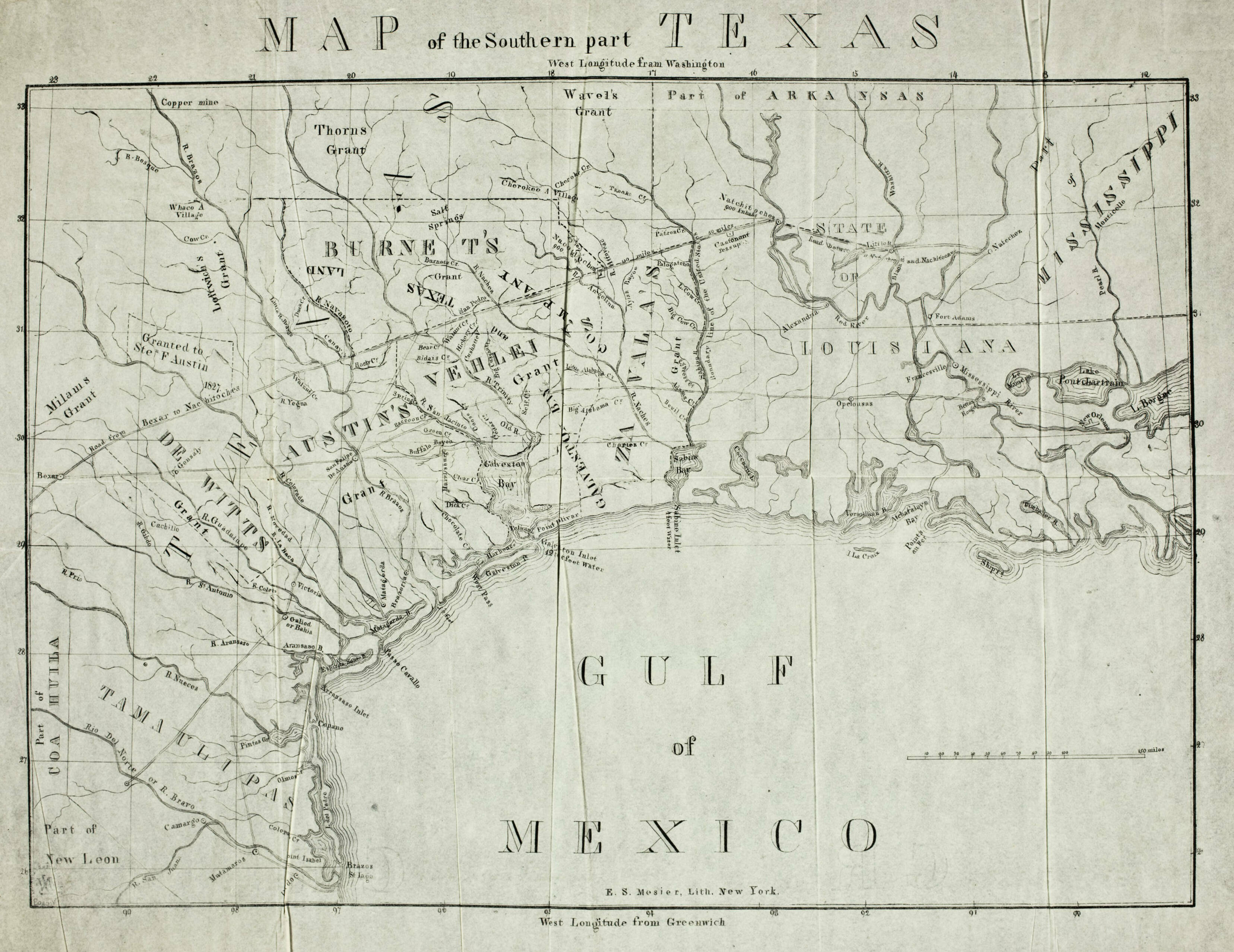
Map of Southern Texas, Courtesy of the Library of Congress

Vidal enlisted as a private in the Confederate army in October 1862 at the age of 16. (Note: The Texas State Historical Society said that he was 21 years of age, but he would have been 16 or 17, having been born in 1845.) Knowledgeable of the border, he was promoted ultimately to captain and he was assigned to guard the mouth of the Rio Grande River near Boca Chica. He organized the Vidal's Cavalry Company with 60 Tejano and Mexican soldiers near Brownsville and they subsequently captured a Union gunboat and its crew. Vidal was recognized for his bravery.

Vidal's time in the Confederate army was difficult and he regularly argued with higher-ranking officials. His superiors, mostly Anglo men, remarked that Vidal was "unable to communicate in English with his superiors.” Vidal was frustrated by the lack of adequate clothing and supply shipments for his men, as compared to that of white confederate soldiers. (Note: The lack of supplies was further compounded by a severe drought in 1862 generated a food shortage that strangled the Southern economy. This combined with slaves abandoning plantations to reach Union lines drastically reduced the supplies needed to wage war.)

On October 26, 1863, Vidal disobeyed an order to bring his company to Fort Brown and led his company to defect from the Confederate army. On the way to Brownsville, he forced rancheros to march with him. Two days later, Captain Edmund P. Turner at Fort Brown ordered soldiers from the 26th Cavalry Division and the 33rd Regiment to Brownsville to bring Vidal to Fort Brown. Privates D. H. Dashiel and Jerry Literal, were dispatched by General Hamilton P. Bee to give to Vidal order telling him that he should go to Brownsville to protect cotton and military supplies. Bee was anticipating the imminent arrival of Union Army troops at Brownsville. Bee received news that Vidal had killed one man and captured three others at Clarksville. Dashiel was killed and Literal (Litteral) was wounded by Vidal's troops about 14 miles (23 km) east of Brownsville. Literal, who was shot in the jaw, made it back to Bee's headquarters and wrote a note to the general that Vidal planned on attacking Brownsville. Bee planned for the attack, utilizing additional troops and Brownsville citizens to protect the town and Fort Brown. Vidal did not attack Brownsville, but he attacked nearby ranches and killed several Confederate sympathizers or at least ten individuals, some of whom were Vidal's adversaries. then he went to Mexico. Vidal, now called a traitor, reportedly hid out near Matamoros, but 22 of his men were captured.

Of the mutiny, historian Jerry D. Thompson states,

Only later did it become evident that Vidal was under the influence of Cortina. Vidal may have also been in communication with the commander of the Union navy blockading the lower Texas coast.

— Fronteras: Cortina: Defending the Mexican Name In Texas (Note: Vidal served under Juan Cortina during the Second French intervention in Mexico by 1865.)

Across the Rio Grande from Brownsville sits the town of Matamoros, where 400 Union troops and Juan Cortina and his troops assembled on November 3, 1863. Seeing the enemies, Bee ordered Fort Brown and Brownsville to be evacuated and then set on fire, which destroyed thousands of bales of cotton as well as large quantities of military commissary stores and quartermaster supplies. The fire ignited 8,000 pounds of gunpowder that did further damage.

== Union Army ==
By November 10, 1863, Vidal and some of his men returned to the United States and enlisted in the Union Army. Vidal was mustered in on November 26, 1863, as a captain. He raised 89 soldiers for his company, (Note: Wooster states that Vidal and his troops signed up in December 1863.) known as "Vidal's Independent Partisan Rangers". They worked along the Texas frontier as scouts. They reported Confederate positions along the Nueces Strip and along the Rio Grande as far upriver as Roma. Vidal disrupted the flow of Confederate goods on the Rio Grande by destroying ships headed downstream to resupply Confederate forces. Frustrated by bureaucracy and discrimination, Vidal sent a resignation request in May 1864 and he and his men returned to Mexico (Note: U.S. Army Civil War Records showed that Vidal deserted on June 19, 1864. Thompson states that at some point the army issued Vidal an honorable discharge, but the paperwork was delayed and did not arrive until Vidal had already left for Mexico.) to join Cortina.

== Mexican Army ==
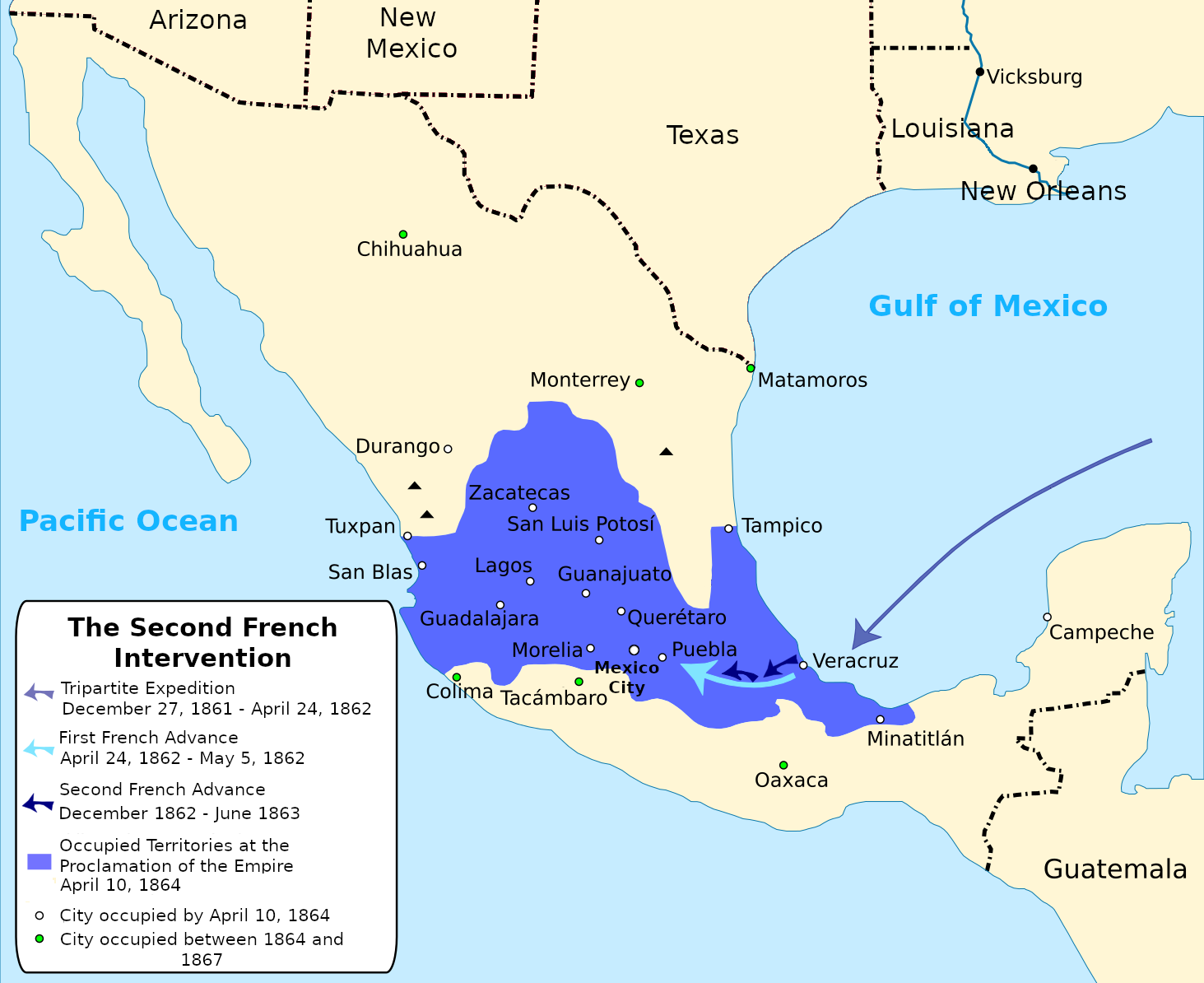
Second French intervention in Mexico

In addition to the Civil War in the United States, there was also a contemporaneous conflict occurring just a few hundred miles south between the Mexicans and the French. In the early 1860s, Mexico defaulted on many of its debts owed to the creditor nations of France, Spain, and England, who sent armadas to the Gulf of Mexico. Spain and England renegotiated and left peacefully. However, talks with France fell through and the French invaded, looking to establish a new territory in the region as repayment for the debts owed.

Vidal and many of his men were born in Mexico or were of Mexican ancestry. They joined the Mexican army to fight during the Second French intervention in Mexico, serving under General Juan Cortina as Juaristas. In June 1865, Vidal was captured by the French at Camargo. Hearing news of his capture, Mifflin Kenedy traveled to the area with a ransom to try to convince his step-son's captors to let him go. By the time Kenedy arrived, Captain Vidal had already been or he witnessed his step-son being executed by a French Army firing squad on June 14, 1865, at Camargo. Kenedy retrieved Vidal's body and had him interred at the old Brownsville cemetery.

== Personal life ==
Vidal married Anita Chavero (1848–1923) and they had a daughter Anita, whose married name was Anita Cowan. After Adrian's death, his widow married J.P. Putegnat of Brownsville. Anita remained connected with the Vidal-Kenedy family, being at the home of Mifflin Kenedy's son John G. Kenedy at the time of Mifflin's death on March 14, 1895. Identified as a stepdaughter, she traveled with John to be with their family.

== Sources ==
- Thompson, Jerry D. (2007). Fronteras: Cortina: Defending the Mexican Name In Texas. Texas A&M University Press. ISBN 978-1-60344-451-4.
