= Philo Dibble =

American diplomat (1951–2011)

- Born: September 10, 1951; Alexandria, Egypt
- Died: October 1, 2011 (aged 60); McLean, Virginia, U.S.
- Education: Sidwell Friends School; Woodrow Wilson High School; St. John's College; Johns Hopkins University
- Occupation: Diplomat
- Spouse: Elizabeth Dibble
- Children: 3
- Parent(s): Philo Tolman Dibble; Cleopatra Bolens

Philo Louis Dibble (September 10, 1951 – October 1, 2011) was an American diplomat.

== Early life ==
Dibble was born on September 10, 1951, in Alexandria, Egypt. He was named for his father, Philo Tolman Dibble, who was also a diplomat.

Dibble attended the Sidwell Friends School and graduated from the Woodrow Wilson High School. He graduated from St. John's College in 1976. He went to graduate school at Johns Hopkins University, where he earned a master's degree in international studies in 1980.

== Career ==
Dibble joined the United States Foreign Service in 1980. He served as a diplomat in Saudi Arabia, Tunisia, Pakistan, Syria and Lebanon. He served in Lebanon shortly after the 1983 United States embassy bombing. He was retired from 2006 to 2010.

Dibble returned to the Foreign Service in September 2010, when he was appointed as the deputy assistant secretary of state for Iran for the Bureau of Near Eastern Affairs. Dibble was instrumental in the release, in September 2011, of two American hikers who had been held in Iran for two years. Shane Bauer and Joshua Fattal were released from Iranian capture after two years in September 2011. Dibble, along with a team of U.S. Department of State officials negotiated their release. He used his connections with diplomats from Oman and Switzerland to secure their release.

== Personal life and death ==
Dibble was married to Elizabeth Dibble, née Elizabeth Link. They had three daughters. They resided in McLean, Virginia.

Dibble died of a heart attack on October 1, 2011, aged 60. His funeral, held at the Holy Trinity Catholic Church, was attended by hundreds of people, including U.S. Secretary of State, Hillary Clinton.
