= Ig Publishing =

American publishing company

- Founded: 2002
- Country of origin: United States
- Headquarters location: New York City
- Distribution: Publishers Group West (US); Turnaround Publisher Services (UK)
- Key people: Robert Lasner
- Publication types: Books
- Official website: www.igpub.com

Ig Publishing is a New York-based press devoted to publishing original literary fiction and political and cultural nonfiction. The editor is writer Robert Lasner, and the publisher is Elizabeth Clementson. The press was founded in 2002.

Among Ig's awards are a PEN/Hemingway Honorable Mention for Damn Love by Jasmine Beach-Ferrara, an Indie Next selection for Rachel Weaver's Point of Direction, a Sydney Taylor Honor book selection for Isabel's War by Lila Perl, a 5 Under 35 pick for The Hopeful, an ALA Notable pick in fiction for Missile Paradise by Ron Tanner, a Montana Book Award Honorable Mention for A Bloom of Bones, a Center for Fiction First Novel Prize Shortlist Selection a 2018 CLMP Firecracker Award nomination for Empire of Glass, a Center For Fiction longlist selection for Restless Souls, a Great Group Reads selection for Unfurled. Ig's titles have been reviewed in The New York Times, Booklist, Kirkus, Publishers Weekly, Library Journal, The Los Angeles Times, The Wall Street Journal, Oprah Magazine, the Chicago Tribune, NPR, and many other places.

== History ==
Ig was founded in 2002 with the release of Robert Lasner's novel For Fucks Sake. The press also released a series of Dive Bar guides to select cities – New York, Chicago and San Francisco – from 2002 to 2004. Ig also released several literary novels, including Grant Bailie's Cloud 8 and Richard Madelin's Careful!

Inspired by the rise of the progressive political blogosphere, Ig began publishing political non-fiction, along with literary fiction.

During this time, Ig also re-published several non-fiction classics, including Edward Bernays's Propaganda, Vance Packard's The Hidden Persuaders, and Empire As A Way of Life by William Appleman Williams.

== Increasing reputation in politics ==
In the lead-up to the 2008 election, Ig published Loser Take All: Election Fraud and The Subversion of Democracy, 2000-2008, highlighting the vast electoral fraud in the 2000, 2002, 2004 and 2006 elections. The collection was edited by Mark Crispin Miller.

In 2013, Ig released The Terror Factory: Inside the FBI's Manufactured War on Terrorism by award-winning investigative journalist Trevor Aaronson. An outgrowth of Aaronson's article for Mother Jones magazine, The Terror Factory exposed how the FBI, under the guise of engaging in counterterrorism since 9/11, built a network of more than 15,000 informants whose primary purpose is to infiltrate Muslim communities to create and facilitate phony terrorist plots so that the Bureau can then claim it is winning the war on terror.

== Literary fiction ==
Ig is particularly known for its literary fiction. In 2012, the press released The Care and Feeding of Exotic Pets by Diana Wagman, which was named a Barnes and Noble Discover pick. In 2014, Ig released Point of Direction by Rachel Weaver, which was named an Indie Next selection. Ig has had multiple titles reviewed by prestigious publications including The New York Times, NPR, Publishers Weekly, Oprah Magazine, Kirkus Reviews and Booklist. Damn Love, a short story collection by Jasmine Beach-Ferrara, received a PEN/Hemingway Honorable Mention in 2014. In 2015, Tracy O'Neill's The Hopeful was named a 5 Under 35 pick by the National Book Foundation. The press's fiction list has won several more awards since then, including the CLMP Firecracker Award in Fiction in 2022 for Celeste Mohammed's Pleasantview, a novel-in-stories set in Trinidad.
