= Mifflin Kenedy =

American businessman and rancher (1818–1895)

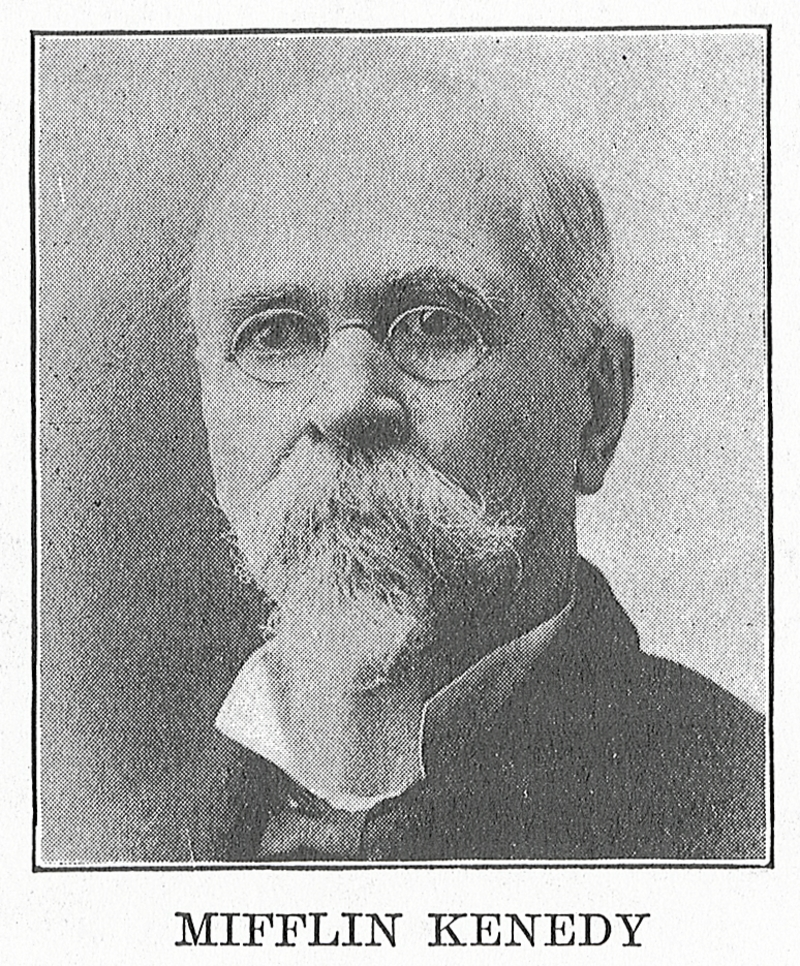
- Born: June 8, 1818; Downingtown, Pennsylvania, US
- Died: March 14, 1895 (aged 76); Corpus Christi, Texas, US
- Occupations: Rancher, steamboat operator, and investor
- Spouse: Petra Vela de Vidal (m. 1852; died 1885)
- Relatives: Adrián Vidal (step-son), Sarita Kenedy East (granddaughter)

Mifflin Kenedy (June 8, 1818 – March 14, 1895) was an American businessman and rancher. He began his steamboating career on the Ohio, Mississippi, and Missouri Rivers. He then went to Texas and northern Mexico, where he helped get many steamboats to the Rio Grande area during the First Cortina War (1859–1860). Using the Corvette, he transported General Zachary Taylor and his soldiers on the Rio Grande and then overland to Camargo, Mexico. He became successful during the Civil War when he transported goods along the Rio Grande. Kenedy operated ranches and invested in railroads in Texas, some of them in partnership with Richard King. He was among the first ranchers to fence in his ranches, starting with the 36-miles of fencing around Laureles Ranch. Kenedy was inducted into the Hall of Great Westerners.

== Early life and career ==
Kenedy was born on June 8, 1818, in Downingtown, Pennsylvania, to Sarah (Starr) and John Kenedy, who were Quakers and descendants of Irish immigrants. The Kenedy immigrant arrived with Lord Baltimore at the Maryland Colony. The maternal line descends from French Huguenots.

He first attended schools in Chester County and then was educated at Jonathan Gause's Quaker boarding school. Kenedy began teaching school at age 15 and again several years later in Coatsville, Pennsylvania. Between the two teaching positions, he was a cabin boy on a ship destined for Calcutta, India named the Star of Philadelphia. He left for India on April 4, 1834, and returned in January 1836.

== Career ==
=== Steamboat and trade operations ===
Kenedy began working as a clerk on steamers in 1836. He then began to work as acting captain on steamboats on the Ohio, Mississippi, and Missouri Rivers for six years. He then held the same positions on the Champion, along the Chattahoochee and Apalachicola Rivers and the Gulf Coast from 1842 to 1846. During this period, he met Richard King, a river pilot. While piloting the Champion, he stopped for repairs in Pittsburgh, Pennsylvania, where he met John Saunders, a major during the Mexican–American War (1846–1848). Saunders arranged for boats to transport goods for the army along the Rio Grande. Kenedy was then employed to take the Corvette to New Orleans. (Note: Hunter states that Kenedy was ordered to take the Champion to Pittsburgh, where he met Saunders, vs. stopping for repairs.) He arrived on June 17, 1846 and enlisted in the army. He worked as Saunders as a master, transporting supplies and troops along the Rio Grande. Richard King came to the area in 1847 and was a pilot.

After the war, he traded goods in Mexico. In 1850, he established a partnership with Richard King, James O'Donnell, and Charles Stillman called M. Kenedy and Company. They operated steamships on the Rio Grande, operating out of Brownsville, Texas. Kenedy continued his involvement in M. Kenedy and Company, at some point he and King bought out the other partners. In 1865, the firm was renamed King, Kenedy and Company. The firm transported goods, like cotton, via 26 boats. They continued operating until 1874, when steamboat operators could no longer compete with railroads.

=== War time ===
Kenedy and E. Jeff Kenedy were among the Brownsville residents who aided in the pursuit of Juan Cortina after he attacked Brownsville in 1859. He enlisted to fight against Juan Cortina during the First Cortina War (1859–1860). Kenedy served under Samuel P. Heintzelman as captain of Company A. Beginning in July 1846, he transported General Zachary Taylor and his soldiers from Fort Brown (or across the Rio at Matamoros) along the Rio Grande on the Corvette steamboat and then marched overland to Camargo, Mexico, arriving August 8, 1846. Kenedy helped having many more steamboats brought to the Rio Grande through M. Kenedy and Company and continued his transportation efforts until the end of the war.

During the Civil War, M. Kenedy and Company were successful in transporting goods down the Rio Grande. That included transporting his own and Confederate cotton to the Mexican border. King Ranch was a station on the route to the border. The cotton was put onto foreign ships for Europe, avoiding the Union Army's blockade.

=== Ranching ===
Kenedy began sheep ranching near El Sal del Rey in Hidalgo County, having 10,000 Merino sheep in 1854. He lost a number of sheep on the journey from Pennsylvania to Texas and then lost 75% of the herd before he sold the remaining flock to John McClain in 1856.

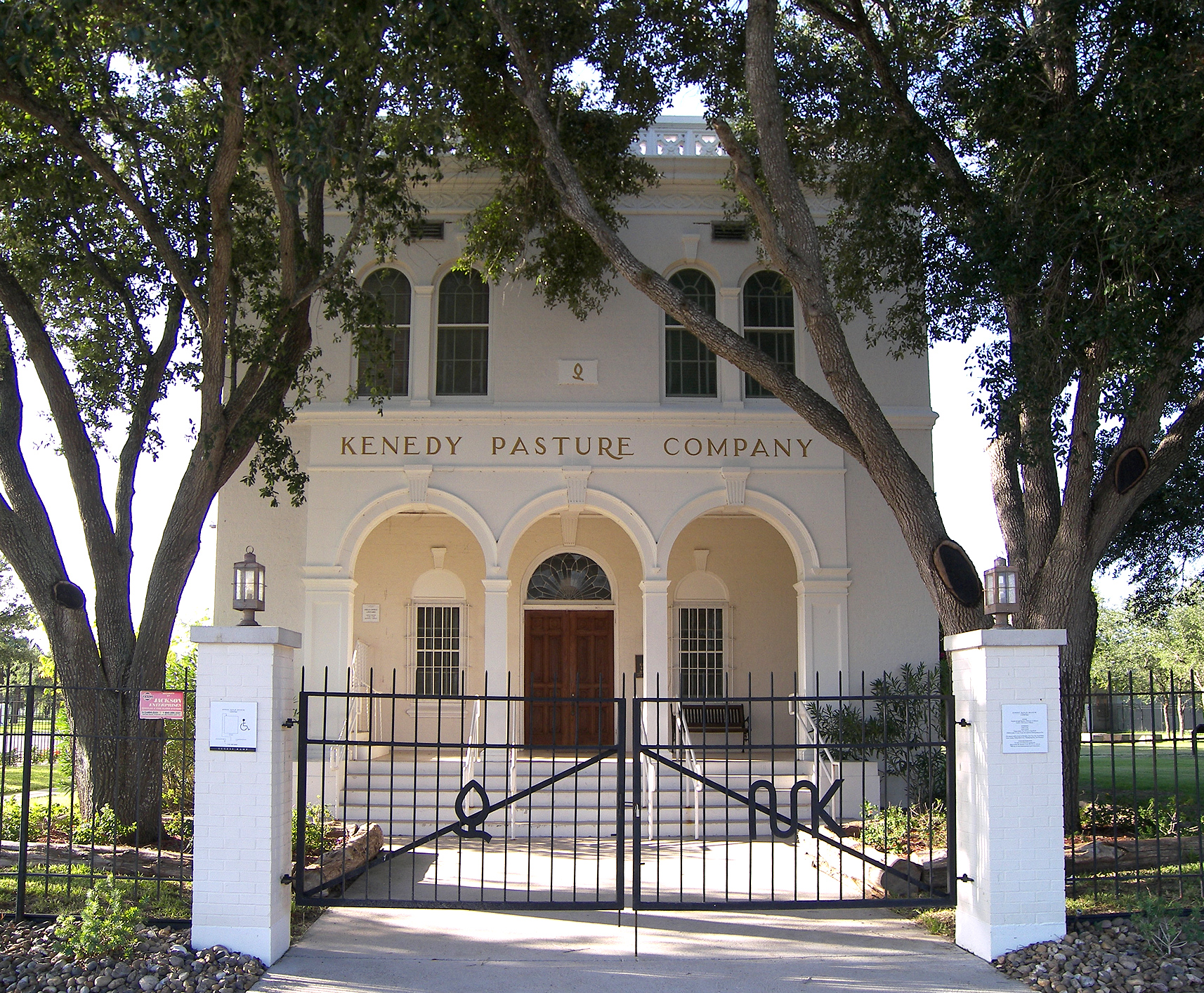
Kenedy Pasture Company Headquarters located in Sarita, Kenedy County, Texas

In 1860, Kenedy and King became partners of the Santa Gertrudis Ranch (Santa Gertrudis cattle) in South Texas, where cattle, sheep, mules, and goats ranged along the Nueces Strip. After eight years, Kenedy sold his share of the ranch and purchased the Laureles Ranch, south of Corpus Christi, from Charles Stillman. It was a cattle, sheep, and horse ranch. After the war, Laureles Ranch expanded to 242,000 acres. King and Kenedy were the first owners of large ranches to fence their lands, which Kenedy began with 36 miles (58 km) of fencing at Laureles in 1869. This was an important deterrent to thieves who flourished in the area after the Civil War. The ranch was sold in 1882 to Underwood, Clark, and Company of Kansas City, which became the Texas Land and Cattle Company. At the time of the sale, there were 50,000 heads of cattle as well as 5,000 heads of horses and mules. The ranch sold for $1,000,000 (equivalent to $33,362,069 in 2025). He then established the La Parra Ranch in Cameron County, what is now Kenedy County, Texas, and the Kenedy Pasture Company in 1882. He fenced in the 400,000 acre La Parra Ranch (which is near Sarita, Texas). Kenedy Pasture Company, of 765,000 acres of land in South Texas, has been 20 miles wide and 30 miles long.

=== Railroad ===
In 1876, Kenedy and King invested in the construction of a railroad line built by Uriah Lott between Corpus Christi and Laredo called the Corpus Christi, San Diego and Rio Grande Gauge Railroad. He provided financial backing for Lott's construction of the San Antonio and Aransas Pass Railway in 1885.

== Personal life ==
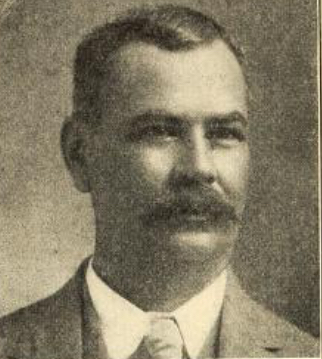
John G. Kenedy

On April 16, 1852, Kenedy married Petra Vela de Vidal in Mier, Mexico. The widow of Colonel Luis Vidal, she came to the marriage with six children. The couple also had another six children, two of whom were alive in 1895, John G. Kenedy and Sarah Josephine (Kenedy) Spohn, whose husband was Dr. A. E. Spohn. Also alive were four stepdaughters and an adopted daughter, Carmen Morrell Kenedy. Kenedy died suddenly of a heart attack in Corpus Christi on March 14, 1895, aged 76, and was buried at Brownsville, as was his widow. John G. Kenedy became the sole owner of Kenedy Ranch when he purchased the interests of other heirs. He became president of the Kenedy Pasture Company.

== Legacy and popular culture ==
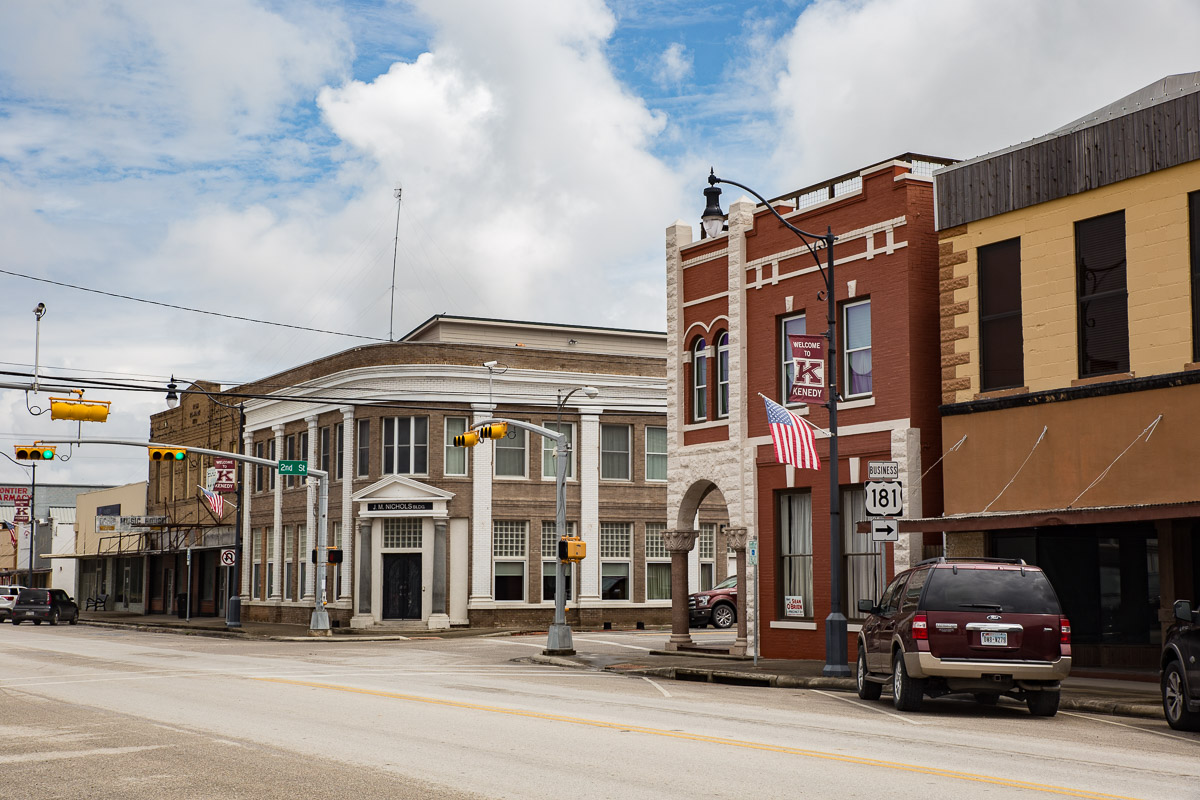
Kenedy, Texas, named after Mifflin Kenedy

- Kenedy County and the town of Kenedy in Texas were named after Mifflin Kenedy.
- Trace Adkins portrayed Kenedy in Wyatt Earp's Revenge (2012)
- Kenedy was inducted into the Hall of Great Westerners in 1960.
- There is a legend that Kenedy's daughter, Sarita Kenedy, helped gain Gregorio Cortez's release from prison. There is no evidence to support this story, but the Kenedys were known to help Texas-Mexicans. Her married name was Sarah Spohn.

== See also ==
- Baffin Bay (Texas) § Etymology
- Kenedy Ranch Museum of South Texas at List of museums in South Texas

== Sources ==
- Pierce, Frank Cushman (1917). A Brief History of the Lower Rio Grande Valley. George Banta Publishing Company.
