= Aynesworth =

Aynesworth is an English surname. Notable people with the surname include:

- Allan Aynesworth (1864–1959), English actor and screenwriter
- Hugh Aynesworth (1931–2023), American journalist and author
