= Shafiee =

Shafiee is a surname. Notable people with the surname include:

- Abbas Shafiee (1937–2016), Iranian pharmaceutical chemist
- Masoud Shafiee, Iranian lawyer
