= Beacon Reader =

Beacon
- Website type: Crowdfunding / Journalism
- Creators: Dan Fletcher, Dmitri Cherniak and Adrian Sanders
- Website: beaconreader.com
- Commercial: Yes
- Current status: offline

Beacon or Beacon Reader was an independent web platform to fund journalism projects founded in 2013. It was based in Oakland, California. Hundreds of journalists used the platform to finance their writing and investigations. The organisers worked with newspaper publications to promote the projects, and to help the stories produced reach a wider audience. Beacon announced in an email on October 4, 2016 that they are no longer offering services for journalists or backers, and that on September 12, 2016 all active subscriptions were cancelled and no further contributions could be made.

As of 2015, over US$1,000,000 was raised via 20,000 donors to fund journalism. The site differed from existing models of funding journalism with donations, such as National Public Radio and Kickstarter by focusing on the journalist, providing publishing support, vetting and audience participation in story development. Failure for individual writers is high, however popular news outlets, e.g. The Huffington Post and The Texas Tribune, have been more successful in raising funds.

== Example projects ==
- The Huffington Post crowdfunded over $40,000 for a fellowship to allow a journalist to remain in Ferguson, Missouri to cover the protests in that city.
- My Four Months as a Private Prison Guard - $75,000 salary funding for Shane Bauer, a hiker and journalist who was imprisoned in Iran for 26 months.
- The Net Neutrality Battle - Techdirt raised nearly $70,000 to support its coverage of the net neutrality fight in Washington, D.C.
- Climate Confidential - a team of six climate and environment reporters, raised over $46,000 to create a micro-publication devoted to climate issues.
- The Texas Tribune obtained funding for a series of stories on how the shale boom is changing Texas.
- Wolf OR7 - a grey wolf is scientifically studied making a journey from Oregon to California

== Criticism ==
The partnership between Beacon and The Huffington Post was criticised for allowing a for-profit corporation seek and accept funding for donations that are usually reserved for non-profit entities. The fear is that it may be easier to crowdfund journalist salaries than expending corporate profits.

== See also ==
- Comparison of crowd funding services
- Decline of newspapers
