= Sarita Kenedy East =

American rancher and philanthropist (1889–1961)

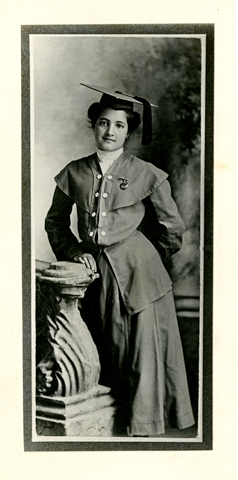
- Likely taken before December 1910, when she married
- Born: Sarita Kenedy; September 19, 1889; Corpus Christi, Texas
- Died: February 11, 1961 (aged 71); New York City, New York
- Occupation(s): Rancher and philanthropist
- Spouse: Arthur Lee East
- Parents: John G. Kenedy, Sr.; Marie Stella (Turcotte) Kenedy
- Relatives: Mifflin Kenedy (grandfather); Petra Vela de Vidal Kenedy (grandmother); Adrián Vidal (uncle)

Sarita Kenedy East (1889–1961) was a rancher and philanthropist from South Texas. She played an active role in the management of her half of La Parra Ranch, and after her brother had become ill, she also leased and oversaw the management of his half of the ranch. East was called patrona for her role in ensuring the health, education, and well-being of the ranch employees and their families. She was a generous philanthropist, particularly concerning Catholic charities. East received the Pro Ecclesia et Pontifice medal from Pope Pius XII in 1952, in recognition of her service and donations to the church. Before she died, she donated $300,000 (equivalent to $3,235,959 in 2024) to establish a monastery in Chile for Trappist monks.

Already made wealthy by an inheritance from her father, East's wealth increased dramatically when oil was found on Kenedy Ranch and San Pablo Ranch. She established the John G. and Marie Stella Kenedy Memorial Foundation, which became the center of decades of court cases between the family and the Diocese of Corpus Christi against a Trappist monk named Brother Leo and J. Peter Grace, who had facilitated the creation of the charitable organization.

After East's death, the family claimed that the two men had exerted undue influence against East when her mind was not sharp due to her declining health and the medications that she took. Lawsuits were filed to contest the will and management of the estate. Brother Leo lost the case against him and all the subsequent appeals, including when the United States Supreme Court refused to hear his appeal. The Vatican had sent Archbishop John Krol of Philadelphia to investigate. Brother Leo was dismissed by May 1966.

The Kenedy Ranch is now operated by two different trusts. The John G. Kenedy Jr. Charitable Trust, as named by Elena Seuss Kenedy, manages the northern section of the ranch of approximately 200,000 acres. It is the land that John G. Kenedy had inherited. The southern section, about 235,000 acres, is operated by the John G. and Marie Stella Kenedy Memorial Foundation, established by East. It is the land inherited by East. Another charitable foundation was established called the Sarita Kenedy East Foundation, which is managed out of New York City.

== Early life ==
Sarita Kenedy was born on September 19, 1889, in Corpus Christi, Texas to Marie Stella (Turcotte) and John G. Kenedy. She was the granddaughter of Mifflin Kenedy, who founded the La Parra Ranch in what is now Kenedy County, Texas, which was named after Mifflin. The town of Sarita, which was located on the Kenedy ranch, was founded around 1904. John G. Kenedy named it for his daughter. Sarita's mother was a philanthropist, particularly dedicated to Catholic charities. She received the Pro Ecclesia et Pontifice medal from Pope Pius XII in 1939 in recognition of her years of service and donations to the church. The Oblate Fathers, an order of missionary men, were guests at the ranch.

Sarita had her First Communion in 1902. The prayer book that she was given at her First Communion and the rosary beads that she carried with her are among the collection of the Bullock Texas State History Museum. An outdoors girl, she gravitated to riding horses, shooting firearms, and hunting, doing "as well as any man on the place".

Sarita was educated in Corpus Christi at the Incarnate Word Academy. She made her debut in New Orleans and attended H. Sophie Newcomb Memorial College there. In 1912, after graduating with a degree in agricultural management from Texas A&M University, her brother John married Elena Suess and settled at the La Parra Ranch compound. Upon her father's death, La Parra Ranch was split into two separate ranches that were operated separately by John and his sister.

== Marriage ==
On December 8, 1910, she married Arthur Lee East, becoming Sarita Kenedy East. Arthur was raised in a family of horse traders and ranchers. The couple lived and worked together on La Parra Ranch, often riding their horses together, going to cow camps jointly, and working together during roundup time. Arthur, although an entertaining and well-informed man, liked to be alone. He often worked at East's San Pablo Ranch, which adjoined his nephew Tom East, Jr.'s property, while Sarita remained at La Parra.

Early in their marriage, East and her husband both suffered from undulant fever, which left them infertile. Her brother, sterile from a case of mumps, and sister-in-law did not have children, either. East and her brother inherited Kenedy Ranch from their father John G. Kenedy. They were the last of the Kenedys to inherit the Kenedy fortune. Arthur died of a heart attack in 1944. By 1948, Sarita lived alone at the La Parra mansion.

== Career ==
East operated her ranch separately from her brother, but there were some shared operational processes. She was involved in the daily operations and was the clear head of her ranch. East often worked alongside the workers, called Kenedenos, who were well-respected for their expertise and positions of authority. She also oversaw the medical, educational, and other key needs of the families who worked for her, for which she received the name patrona. (Note: The Texas State Historical Association states that East and her brother John G. Kenedy, Jr. managed the La Parra Ranch together after the death of Arthur East. Her brother died in 1948, after which East and Elena Suess Kenedy, her sister-in-law, owned and operated the 400,000-acre ranch.) Her brother John's health declined in his later years and East bought John's stock and leased and operated his portion of the ranch. In the 1950s, East allowed for oil and gas exploration on the ranch. (Note: Exxon Oil Company operates hydrocarbon liquid and natural gas production on the ranch.)

East also owned the Twin Peaks Ranch in Colorado and the 43,000-acre San Pablo Ranch near Hebbronville in Jim Hogg County, Texas; She purchased them to expand her ranch holdings. Oil was found on her San Pablo Ranch and she began to get checks for millions of dollars as a result. She sat on the Alice National Bank board of directors.

== Philanthropy ==
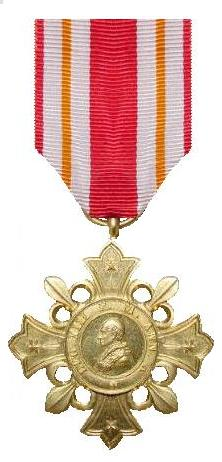
Pro Ecclesia et Pontifice medal

East primarily supported Catholic charities. She was named an honorary member of the Franciscans and the Oblates of Mary Immaculate. Pope Pius XII recognized her years of service to the church in 1952 by awarding her the Pro Ecclesia et Pontifice medal. She was also granted membership in the Ladies of the Holy Sepulchre of Jerusalem.

She began to donate to Trappist Monks in the 1950s, after meeting Christopher Gregory in 1948. (Note: He is also reportedly said to have been named Roderick Norton Gregory at birth. Michaud and Aynesworth refer to him generally as Brother Leo, but his full name is stated as "Roderick Norton (Brother Leo) Christopher Gregory".) He had been assigned to raise funds for new Trappist monasteries, due to the large influx of men who had fought in World War II who wanted to become monks. Gregory, who had taken the name Brother Leo, became a friend, travel companion, and advisor. East visited monasteries around the world and toured South America with him. She donated $300,000 (equivalent to $3,235,959 in 2024) to build a mission in Chile in 1959. East had also given Brother Leo power of attorney for a bank account that she established that the monk could draw upon.

East began to consider establishing a charitable foundation by 1956, due to large deposits of oil and gas that had been found on La Parra, which were expected to significantly increase her wealth. East established the John G. and Marie Stella Kenedy Memorial Foundation, a charitable organization, on January 21, 1960, with the assistance of Brother Leo and his contact J. Peter Grace. Initially, she was the only member of the foundation. Over time, she gave increasing control to Brother Leo and J. Peter Grace, until Brother Leo was made the sole member of the foundation just before her death. She also changed the members of the foundation's board of directors by removing a lawyer, a relative, and a Bishop from Corpus Christi. They were replaced by Brother Leo and two others from the East Coast, Rev. Patrick Peyton and J. Peter Grace. With $100,000,000 (equivalent to $302,658,552 in 2024) in assets, it became the largest charitable foundation in South Texas by 1984.

== Death and estate ==
External images
- Sarita Kenedy East in her later years
- "The Big House", La Parra, Kenedy Ranch

Sarita Kenedy East died of cancer on February 11, 1961, in New York City, with Brother Leo at her bedside. She was interred at La Parra Ranch.

After East's death, her cousin and Bishop Garriga sued to be reinstated as a member of the foundation. Her cousin got an injunction that prevented access to the foundation's funds by Brother Leo, Grace, and associates. Finding out that Brother Leo had taken $1,000,000, the cousin also wanted an accounting of the money that he had taken. Archbishop John Krol of Philadelphia was sent by the Consistorial Congregation that oversees activity affecting the Holy See (Vatican) to investigate. According to Time magazine, the fight for East's estate was "a bitter battle of words and wits that echoes all the way to the Vatican." Brother Leo was dismissed by May 1966.

She bequeathed much of her wealth to the John G. and Marie Stella Kenedy Memorial Foundation based upon a will dated in 1960. This varied substantially from a will that she made in 1948 that gave 23,000 acres of La Parra Ranch to the church and the bulk of her estate to two first cousins, her closest living relatives. A suit was filed a few months after her death by Elena Suess Kenedy, members of the Turcotte family, and the Diocese of Corpus Christi. They claimed that Brother Leo had exerted undue influence on East, who they said had become disoriented by medication in her later years. They wanted the 1948 will to be reinstated. There were a number of court cases, up to the United States Supreme Court who refused to hear Brother Leo's appeal. As a result of the cases, the 1960 will was upheld with the bulk of her estate in the John G. and Marie Stella Kenedy Memorial Foundation, but it would be operated primarily by Texas relatives and associates. In the end, the foundation honored the spirit of her intentions from the 1948 will.

The Kenedy Ranch is operated by two different trusts. The John G. Kenedy Jr. Charitable Trust, as named by Elena Seuss Kenedy, manages the northern section of the ranch of approximately 200,000 acres. The southern section, about 235,000 acres, is operated by the John G. and Marie Stella Kenedy Memorial Foundation, established by East. Another charitable foundation was established called the Sarita Kenedy East Foundation, which is managed out of New York City.

Hugh Aynesworth and Stephen G. Michaud wrote If You Love Me, You Will Do My Will based upon Kenedy's life and the fight for her estate.

== Sources ==
- Lo Bello, Nino (1973). "9. Where there's a will". Vatican, U.S.A. New York: Pocket Books.
- Michaud, Stephen G.; Aynesworth, Hugh (1990). If you love me, you will do my will. Norton. ISBN 978-0-393-02762-4.
- Monday, Jane Clements (1997). Voices from the Wild Horse Desert. University of Texas Press. ISBN 978-0-292-75204-7.
