= Carolina, Texas =

Ghost town in Texas, US

- Ghost town
- Location in Texas
- Coordinates: 30.7938013°N 95.3968858°W
- Country: United States
- State: Texas
- County: Falls
- Elevation: 289 ft (88 m)
- USGS Feature ID: 1383058

Carolina, formerly Deer Creek, is a ghost town in Falls County, Texas, United States.

== History ==
Carolina was one of the first settlements west of the Brazos River. A post office called Deer Creek was opened in 1852, but was later renamed to Carolina because many of the settlers were originally from North Carolina. The first Presbyterian Church of Falls County was established in Carolina in 1854 after moving from nearby Cameron, Texas. The post office was closed in 1873 after the San Antonio and Aransas Pass Railway moved the stop in the late 1880s. The community was abandoned by the 1930s.
