= Winn Correctional Center =

American men's state prison in Louisiana

Coordinates: 31°51′02″N 92°46′52″W

- Interactive map of Winn Correctional Center
- Location: 180 CCA Boulevard, Winnfield, Louisiana
- Security class: medium security
- Capacity: 1538
- Opened: 1990
- Managed by: LaSalle Corrections
- Director: Keith Deville, Warden

'Results of an Unannounced Inspection of Winn Correctional Center in Winnfield, Louisiana' - published by Office of Inspector General June 2, 2026. Multiple violations including food spoilage were found at the facility.

Winn Correctional Center (WCC) is a state prison for men, part of the Louisiana Department of Corrections prison system, located about 13 miles (21 km) southwest of Winnfield in unincorporated Winn Parish, Louisiana. It is within the Kisatchie National Forest.

As of February 2014, Winn is one of several privately operated prisons in the state. The facility is medium-security and currently has the capacity to house 1,538 inmates. Opened in 1990, it was expanded in 1992.

Winn opened as the first privately managed medium-security prison in the United States. Management of the state-owned facility passed from Corrections Corporation of America to LaSalle Corrections in mid-2015.

== Aged ==
- Adult 18+

== Demographics ==
As of 2016 75% of the inmates are black, and 25% of the prisoners are white or of other ethnic groups. Like in other Louisiana prisons, prison gangs are not common and inmates of various races socialize with one another. About 20% of the prisoners at Winn had committed crimes related to recreational drugs.

As of 2016 women, including some single mothers, make up more than 50% of the prison guards. African-Americans make up the majority of the prison guards.

== Composition ==
The prison has five units: Ash, Birch, Cypress, Dogwood, and Elm. More difficult to manage prisoners are located in the Ash and Elm units, nicknamed by prisoners as "the projects". Dogwood houses trustees and better behaved prisoners, Cypress serves as the segregation unit, and Birch houses mentally ill, elderly, and physically handicapped prisoners.

== Notable employees ==
- Shane Bauer, Mother Jones reporter and former detainee in Iran. His article for Mother Jones, titled "My Four Months as a Private Prison Guard," exposes conditions at the facility that include violence among inmates, poor medical and mental healthcare for inmates, mismanagement and lack of training for CCA employees. His memoir American Prison chronicled these experiences.
