= Kenedy Ranch =

Ranch in Texas, US

Coordinates: 27°13′9″N 97°43′37″W

Kenedy Ranch, also called La Parra Ranch, is located in Kenedy County, Texas. It was established in 1882 by Mifflin Kenedy, a steamboat operator and rancher. His friend and business partner, Richard King, established the adjoining King Ranch. It began as a cattle ranch, but it has found other sources of revenue, including guided hunting and wind farms, due to the changing economy. The town of Sarita was founded in 1904 on land that had been owned by the Kenedy Farm.

The ranch has been owned by three generations of the Kenedy Family. Since the third generation, Sarita Kenedy East and John G. Kenedy, did not have children, the ranch is now controlled by The John G. and Marie Stella Kenedy Memorial Foundation and the John G. Kenedy Charitable Trust. Sarita Kenedy East bequeathed a portion of the land and the mansion that she inherited to the Missionary Oblates of Mary Immaculate (OMI), which now operates the Lebh Shomea House of Prayer.

== Geography and ecosystems ==
Located on a high sand dune in the Nueces Strip (also called the White Horse Desert) and along the coast of South Texas. The main house was built by Mifflin Kenedy at the highest point on the ranch, 37 feet (11 m) above sea level, which has protected it during hurricanes and coastal floods. The ranch is located between Corpus Christi and Brownsville, Texas. The ranch's boundaries are Baffin Bay on the north, Laguna Madre on the east, and a division of King Ranch on the south.

Of the 235,000-acre section administered by The John G. and Marie Stella Kenedy Memorial Foundation, there are several ecosystems, including "120,000 acres of native coastal prairie, 3,000 acres of migrating sand dunes, 40,000 acres of oak woodlands, and mesquite woodlands." Grapevines are wrapped around oak trees. La Parra means "grapevine" in Spanish. Wild whitetail deer and turkeys inhabit the property. There are also coyotes, quail, feral hogs, and nilgai. More than 300 species of birds, including subtropical species, have been sighted on the ranch. Surface-level artesian wells are a source of water for the birds.

== History ==
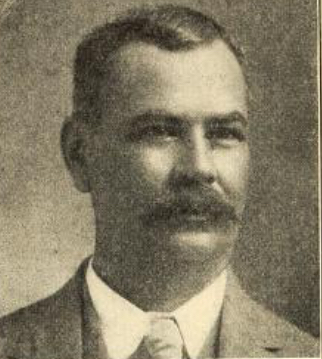
John G. Kenedy

Kenedy began acquiring land for Kenedy Ranch, by establishing the La Parra Ranch and the Kenedy Pasture Company in 1882. It became a large and successful ranch of 400,000 acres by 1895 when Mifflin Kenedy died. At its largest, it was 500,000 acres when Mifflin's son John G. Kenedy consolidated the ranch with other land purchases. The Kenedys first lived in a frame house. The 125-square-mile ranch was located along 35 miles (56 km) coastline. The ranch had up to 800 horses and mules and 40,000 head of cattle. Beginning in 1918, the Kenedys built a three-story mansion. Designed as a Spanish-style mansion, it took five years to build the 30-room residence. It has been called La Casa Grande, Kenedy Mansion, Big House, and the main house. The main house, also called La Parra, was a residence and headquarters for the ranch. Bunkhouses, a dairy, barns, a blacksmith shop, an ice house, a smokehouse, an elementary school, and a commissary allowed the ranch to be self-sustaining. Electricity was produced from a turbine run off an artesian well. To protect the family, gatling guns were installed on the roof of the mansion, and there were underground tunnels if they needed to escape.

Three generations of Kenedys have lived at the ranch, first Mifflin Kenedy, his son John G. Kenedy, Sr., and his daughter Sarita Kenedy East and his son John G. Kenedy, Jr. Sarita lived on the ranch with her husband Arthur Lee East. Mifflin Kenedy made a fortune ferrying cargo on his steamboats and by purchasing land north of the Rio Grande. Families, mostly Hispanic people, have worked on the ranch for four generations. Fathers taught their sons to ride horses, care for cattle, rope, mend fences, and go on weeks-long cow camps.

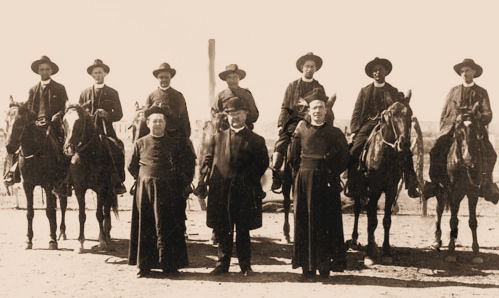
Cavalry of Christ

Jean Baptiste Brétault, a missionary with the Cavalry of Christ, was the first priest to hold mass in the chapel. The missionaries, also called the Missionary Oblates, served people in the White Horse Desert, also called the Nueces Strip, which is between Corpus Christi and Brownsville. La Parra Ranch was a regular stop for Brétault, also called Padre Juanito, until his death in 1934.

Having bought the ranch in 1882, the era of long cattle drives was over. With the establishment of railroad lines, cattle were gathered and held in shipping pens before they were transported on railroad trains.

The ranch began as open land in which rustlers could steal livestock. Sheep could also graze into Kenedy Ranch and destroy the range, which made it difficult for horses and cattle. Some intruders tried to use the ranch's animals for breeding. There is at least one man who began to set up a ranch within Kenedy Ranch. Although it was expensive, Kenedy began installing fences in 1868, first at his Laureles Ranch. He also installed fencing at Kenedy Ranch.

== Sarita ==
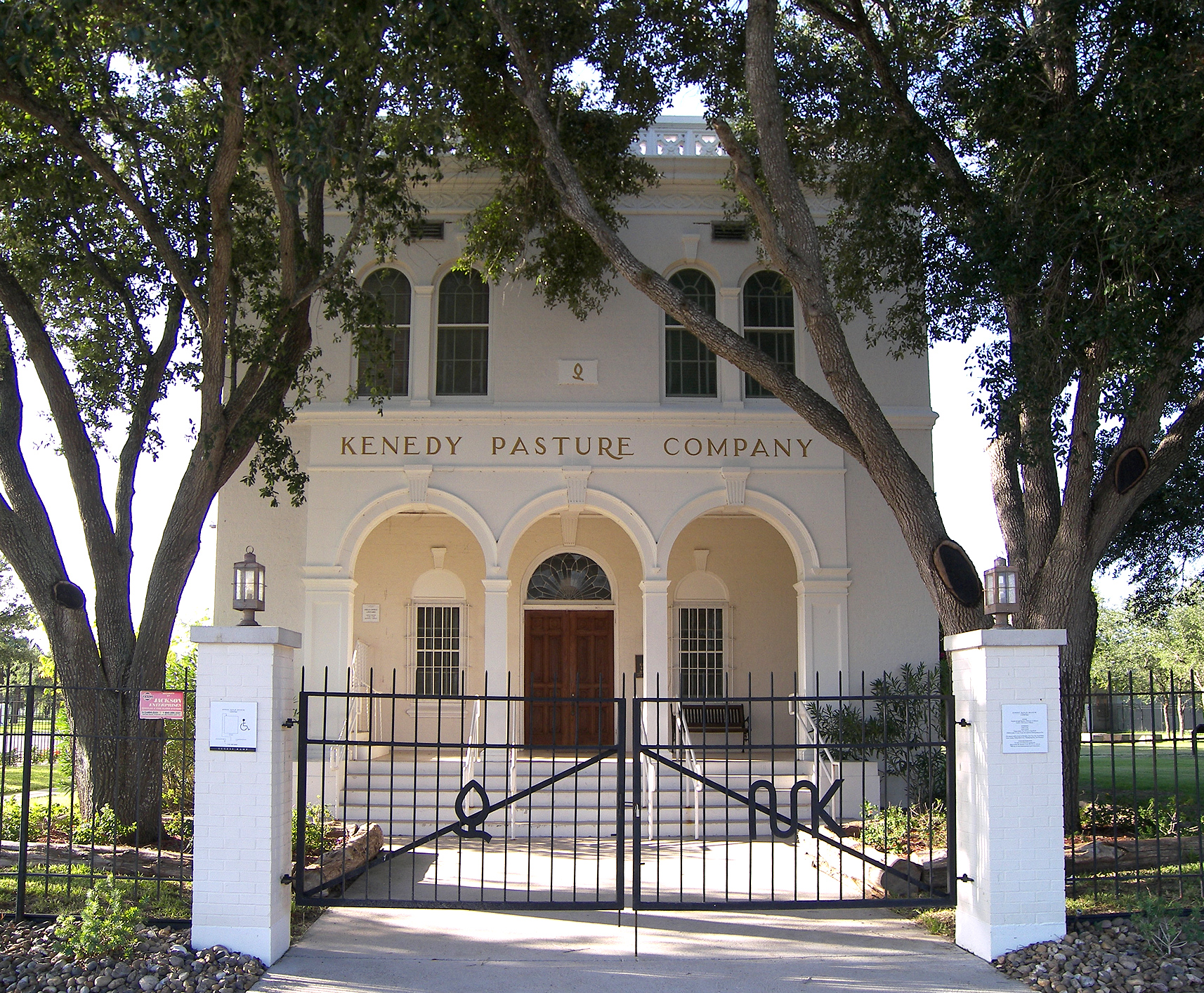
Kenedy Pasture Company, which also houses the Kenedy Ranch Museum, Sarita, Texas, 2008

In 1904, the town of Sarita, Texas was founded from land that had been part of Kenedy Ranch. John G. Kenedy named the town after his daughter Sarita Kenedy East. The town served the Kenedy Pasture Company and Kenedy Ranch and its employees. The company store, ranch offices, and ranch buildings have been located in Sarita. Most of the residents were somehow involved in the Kenedy businesses, either as employees or tenant cotton farmers from Kenedy Pasture Company. The Kenedy Ranch Museum, with art and artifacts about the history of the Kenedy family in South Texas, opened in 2003 in the newly restored Kenedy Pasture Company building.

== Sources of revenue ==
The decline of oil and gas profits caused the ranch to delve into other ways of generating revenue. Revenue from oil and gas fell 50% by 1982. In 1986, Kenedy Ranch was opened up for commercial guided hunting on 22,000 acres of the ranch by The John G and Marie Stella Kenedy Memorial Foundation. There are limits to the number of animals that can be taken by a given hunter, which depends on whether it is deer, quail, nilgai, feral hogs, or turkeys.

Gulf Wind leases 9,600 acres on the ranch for a wind farm. Before the wind farm was installed in 2009, there was a fight between Kenedy Ranch and King Ranch, its neighbor, over the project. King Ranch has been concerned about the danger to birds and their migratory patterns. Kenedy Ranch performed a two-year study and found that the effect would be minimal. The first phase called for 84 wind turbines to operate on land owned by the John G. Kenedy Charitable Trust.

== Organizations ==
Sarita Kenedy East and her brother John G. Kenedy, Jr. inherited Kenedy Ranch from their father John G. Kenedy. They were the last of the Kenedys to inherit the Kenedy fortune. Kenedy Ranch, with a total of 400,000 acres is now divided into sections, which are managed by two organizations, a foundation and a charitable trust, The John G. Kenedy Jr. Charitable Trust, as named by Elena Seuss Kenedy, manages the northern section of the ranch of approximately 200,000 acres. The southern section, about 235,000 acres, is operated by the John G. and Marie Stella Kenedy Memorial Foundation, established by East. Another charitable foundation was established called the Sarita Kenedy East Foundation, which is managed out of New York City.

In addition, after the death of Sarita Kenedy East, the Missionary Oblates of Mary Immaculate (OMI) was bequeathed around 1,100 acres the main house, chapel, and cemeteries. OMI followed East's stipulation that the property was to be used for religious purposes. In 1973, they established the Lebh Shomea House of Prayer, which means "listening heart" in Hebrew.

== See also ==
- Hugh McColl, who has leased part of the ranch
- Mifflin Kenedy Warehouse and Old Starr County Courthouse

== Sources ==
- Monday, Jane Clements (1997). Voices from the Wild Horse Desert. University of Texas Press. ISBN 978-0-292-75204-7.
