= American Prison =

2018 book by Shane Bauer

- Author: Shane Bauer
- Language: English
- Publisher: Penguin Press
- Publication date: 2018/09/18
- Publication place: United States
- Media type: print
- Pages: 368
- Awards: J. Anthony Lukas Book Prize (2019); Helen Bernstein Book Award for Excellence in Journalism (2019); Robert F. Kennedy Book Award (2019)
- Website: PenguinRandomHouse

American Prison: A Reporter's Undercover Journey into the Business of Punishment is a 2018 book by Shane Bauer, published by Penguin Press, about incarceration in the United States and the usage of private prisons.

Bauer had worked at the Winn Correctional Center in Winn Parish, Louisiana, then operated by Corrections Corporation of America (now CoreCivic), as an undercover journalist in 2014. The book is based upon his experiences, which were initially chronicled in a 2016 Mother Jones article written by Bauer. The book was released on September 18, 2018. Bauer alternates between discussing his experiences at Winn and the history of incarceration in the United States.

== Reception ==
Nate Blakeslee of The New York Times wrote that "the sheer number of forehead-slapping quotes from Bauer’s superiors and fellow guards alone are worth the price of admission."

Michael Schaub of National Public Radio described it as "an enraging, necessary look at the private prison system, and a convincing clarion call for prison reform."

Kirkus Reviews described it as "A potent, necessary broadside against incarceration in the U.S."

The book also received the Silver Medal for Non-Fiction from the California Book Awards.

== See also ==
- Newjack
