= A Sliver of Light =

2014 memoir by Shane Bauer

A Sliver of Light: Three Americans Imprisoned in Iran
- First edition
- Author: Shane Bauer, Joshua Fattal, and Sarah Shourd
- Language: English
- Genre: Memoir
- Publisher: Houghton Mifflin Harcourt
- Publication date: 2014

A Sliver of Light: Three Americans Imprisoned in Iran is a 2014 memoir by Shane Bauer, Joshua Fattal, and Sarah Shourd, published by Houghton Mifflin Harcourt/Eamon Dolan. It discusses the 2009–11 detention of American hikers by Iran.

The book uses the first-person narrative and switches between the points of view of Bauer, Fattal, and Shourd. The book ends with the authors, after their release, adjusting to the free world and discussing the Guantanamo Bay detention center, Israel, and regime change.

Publishers Weekly stated that the book has "Moments of humor and insight" and that the "voices" of the co-authors "remain oddly similar".

== Reception ==
Susanne Pari, an Iranian American who wrote a review for the San Francisco Chronicle wrote that the " detailed, nuanced, honest, full-bodied memoir" has "an exciting pace" and that it had an "objective" treatment of the subject matter.

Kirkus Reviews concluded that the book is "An unsugared account that demonstrates the admirable, unbreakable bond of friends, parents and countrymen."

Bob Goldfarb of the Jewish Book Council stated that "it’s absorbing and hard to put down" and that the book "offers many of the pleasures of an epistolary novel."
