= Jerry D. Thompson =

American historian and professor

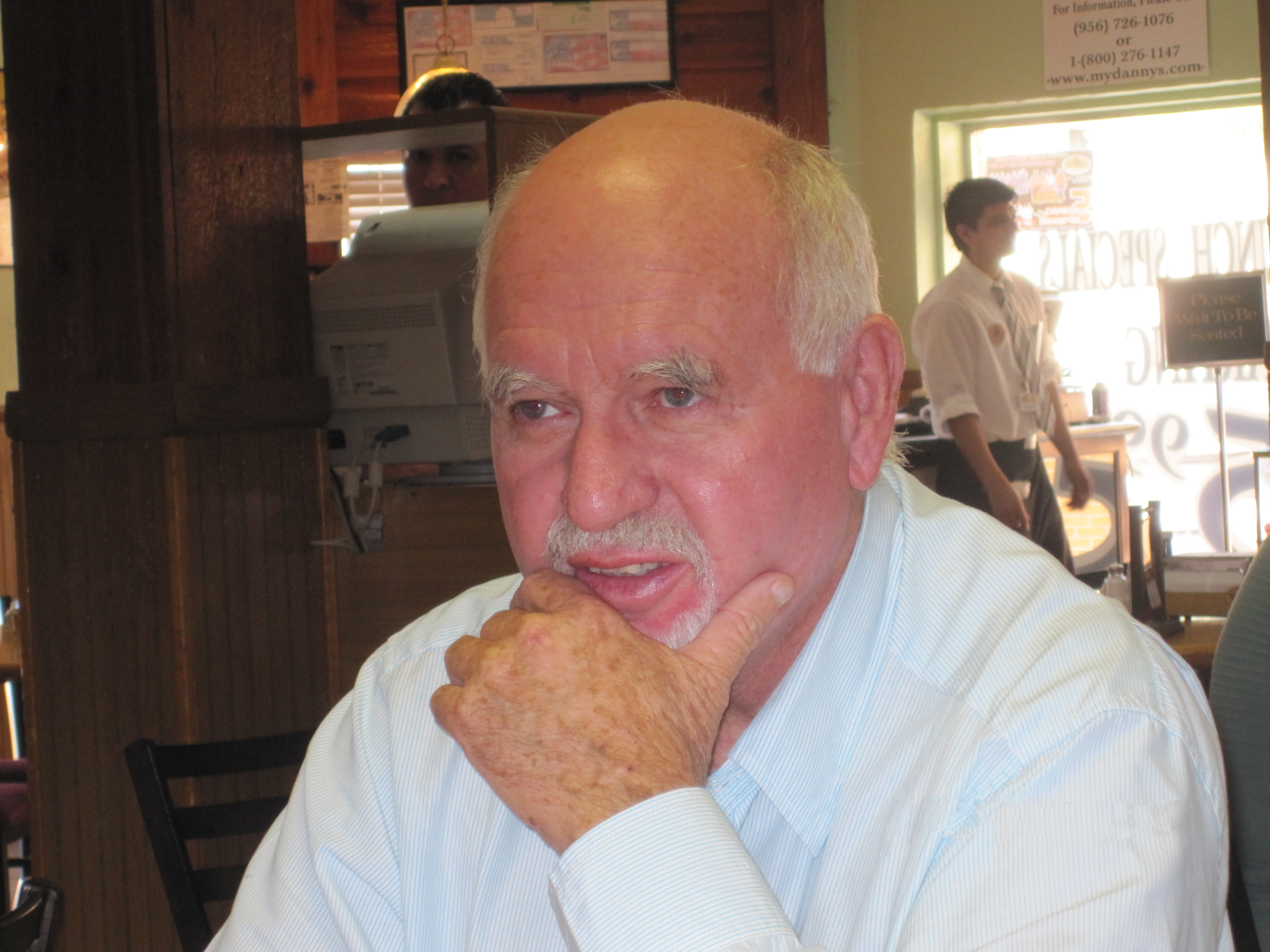
- Born: November 21, 1942 (age 83); Springerville; Apache County; Arizona, US
- Education: Western New Mexico University University of New Mexico Carnegie Mellon University
- Occupations: Professor, writer
- Employer: Texas A&M International University
- Spouse: Sara Cabello Thompson
- Children: Jeremy Thompson
- Parent(s): Jerry W. and Jo Thompson

Jerry Don Thompson (born November 21, 1942) is Regents Piper Professor of History at Texas A&M International University in Laredo, Texas. He is a prolific author of books on a variety of related topics, specializing in the American Civil War, the history of the Southwestern United States, and Texas history. According to WorldCat, two of his books are available from more than six hundred major libraries worldwide – Confederate General of the West: Henry Hopkins Sibley, and Civil War in the Southwest: Recollections of the Sibley Brigade.

== Background ==
Thompson was born to Jerry W. Thompson Jr. (1920–2010), and Jo Thompson (1917–1982) in Springerville in Apache County in eastern Arizona, but he was reared in the unincorporated community of Quemado in Catron County in western New Mexico. He holds a Doctor of Arts degree in history from Carnegie Mellon University in Pittsburgh, Pennsylvania, a Master of Arts in history from the University of New Mexico at Albuquerque, and a Bachelor of Arts in History from Western New Mexico University in Silver City. Thompson has served in the past as Dean of the College of Arts and Humanities at Texas A&M International and Chairperson of the Division of Behavioral and Social Sciences at the Laredo Community College, when that institution was still named Laredo Junior College. It is now Laredo College.

== Career ==
In 2001, Thompson was named Regents Professor of History by the Texas A&M University System Board of Regents. He has received numerous awards in recognition of his scholarship, including the Minnie Stevens Piper Fellowship; T.R. Fehrenbach Award, by the Texas Historical Commission; Kate Broocks Bates Award, by the Texas State Historical Association; Gaspar Perez de Villagra Award, by the Historical Society of New Mexico; and Barry Goldwater Award, by the Arizona Historical Society.

In 2008, his book Cortina: Defending the Mexican Name in Texas won the Texas Institute of Letters award for "Best Scholarly Book."

Other Thompson works are Civil War in the Southwest, A Wild and Vivid Land: An Illustrated History of the South Texas Border, and Into the Far, Wild Country: True Tales of the Old Southwest.

Thompson is a former president of the Texas State Historical Association. In the fall of 2017, Thompson offered a continuing education non-credit weekly class, "The History of Laredo," which consists of field trips, guest speakers, and lectures.

== Recent works ==
2023 Under the Pinon Tree: Finding a Place in Pie Town (University of New Mexico Press)

2020 (With Harwood P. Hinton), Courage Above all Things: General John Ellis Wool and the American Military, 1812-1863, Norman, University of Oklahoma Press)

2019 Wrecked Lives and Lost Souls; Joe Lynch Davis and the Last of the Oklahoma Outlaws, Norman, University of Oklahoma Press

2017 Tejano Tiger: Jose de los Santos Benavides and the Texas-Mexico Borderlands, 1823-1891, Fort Worth, Texas Christian University Press

2016 A Civil War History of the New Mexico Militia and Volunteers, University of New Mexico Press, Albuquerque. 2011 Ed., Tejanos in Gray: The Civil War Letters of Captains Rafael de la Garza and Manuel Yturri, Texas A&M University Press, College Station.

2008 ed., New Mexico Territory During the Civil War: Wallen and Evans Inspection Reports, 1862-1863, University of New Mexico Press, Albuquerque

Ed. (with Thomas T. Smith and Robert Wooster), The Reminiscences of Major General Zenas R. Bliss, 1854-1876, Texas State Historical Association, Austin.

In 2024, Thompson's Under the Piñon Tree: Finding a Place in Pie Town, was selected by the Historical Society of New Mexico as the recipient of its prestigious Fabiola Cabeza de Baca Award, named for Fabiola Cabeza de Baca Gilbert, one of New Mexico State University's first Spanish-speaking home demonstration agents and an educator and nutritionist who invented the U-shaped fried taco shell. Thompson was reared in Catron County near Pie Town. The book of regional history examines his family history, and childhood memories. The book traces the lives of Catron County residents and explores societal change throughout the Great Depression and World War II.

== See also ==
- Adrián Vidal, who Thompson wrote about and said "The young captain had served both the blue and the gray, deserted from both, joined a third army, and was shot by a fourth."

== Bibliography ==
- Jerry D. Thompson (2001). Civil War in the Southwest: Recollections of the Sibley Brigade. Texas A&M University Press. ISBN 978-1-60344-703-4.
- Jerry D. Thompson (2007). Cortina: Defending the Mexican Name In Texas. Texas A&M University Press. ISBN 978-1-60344-451-4.
- Henry Davies Wallen; Andrew Wallace Evans; Jerry D. Thompson (2008). New Mexico Territory During the Civil War: Wallen and Evans Inspection Reports, 1862–1863. UNM Press. ISBN 978-0-8263-4479-3.
