= Petra Vela de Vidal Kenedy =

Mexican rancher (1823–1885)

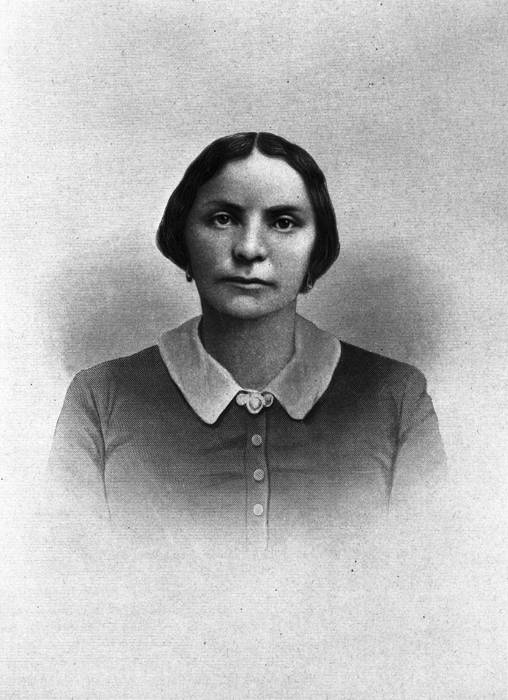
Engraved portrait of Petra Vela de Vidal Kenedy, taken from a photograph

Petra Vela de Vidal Kenedy (31 January 1823 – 16 March 1885) was a Mexican rancher, philanthropist, and matriarch of one of the most influential families in South Texas during the nineteenth century. She was one of the few 19th-century upper-class women of Mexican origin in Texas.

== Personal life ==
Petra Vela was born on June 29, 1825, in Mier, Mexico to Gregorio and Josefa (Resendez) Vela. Her father was a Spanish governor who oversaw the Native Americans and the territory between the Rio Grande and Nueces River (called the Nueces Strip).

Petra's first marriage was to Luis Vidal, a Greek colonel in the Mexican Army, in December 1840. Together, they had six children. Luis' decorated military career allowed him and Petra to become a very wealthy family and allowed Petra to establish military contacts within the Mexican military. Luis Vidal died in 1849 of cholera whereupon Petra inherited much of Luis’ wealth. This added to the wealth she had inherited from her father’s estate in 1846, making Petra a very wealthy woman for this time.

Following her first husband's death, Petra moved with her children to Brownsville, Texas, where she married Mifflin Kenedy, a Quaker rancher, on April 16, 1852. She was then known as Petra Vela de Vidal Kenedy. The couple had six more children and adopted another child. She continued to practice the Catholic religion.

== Management and influence ==
In 1854, the Kenedys had a ranch near El Sal del Rey in Hidalgo County with 10,000 sheep. At that time, frontier raids were commonplace. Their influence grew over the next several years. During the Civil War, became wealthy through the cotton trade and transporting goods on steamboats. The Kenedys became one of the wealthiest families in South Texas, dealing primarily in cattle, horses, sheep, and land.

In the 1860s, Mifflin was partners with Richard King in the King Ranch where they had sheep, horses, and cattle in the 1860s. The partners also invested in land. In 1869, he purchased the Laureles Ranch in Nueces County, Texas, where the Kenedys next lived. The ranch consisted of 172,000 acres and employed 161 people. Kenedy likely managed the servants. Living at the ranch were a Canadian teacher and more than twenty families that had a total of 40 children. Kenedy was able to use her connections to persuade raiders not to raid her ranch and she used her wealth to fund a small army of mercenaries to protect her interest.

Kenedy's health began to decline and by 1882 she was an invalid. The Kennedys sold their ranch to the Texas Land and Cattle Company. They established the Kenedy Pasture Company, which was operated from their son John G. Kenedy's home, La Parra Ranch. Kenedy and her husband settled in Corpus Christi and lived in an Italian villa-style home.

== Later life ==
During Petra's later years, she helped the poor in Corpus Christi and she donated much of her acquired wealth to Catholic institutions all over South Texas, including donations to St. Mary’s Catholic Church in Brownsville, Texas. She died on March 16, 1885, and was buried in Brownsville, Texas.
