= MOLLY National Journalism Prize =

American journalism award

The MOLLY National Journalism Prize is awarded annually by the Texas Democracy Foundation, doing business as The Texas Observer. The award is intended to recognize superior journalism in the tradition of Molly Ivins.

== Description ==
The award, presented annually since 2008, is given for an article or series of up to four short, related articles or columns telling the stories that need telling, challenging conventional wisdom, focusing on civil liberties and/or social justice, and embodying the intelligence, deep thinking and/or passionate wit that marked Ivin's work.

The MOLLY Prize and two Honorable Mentions are then presented at an awards dinner, generally in Austin, Texas, keynoted by a special guest. The prize is a $5,000 award and two Honorable Mentions who receive $1,000 each. Past keynote speakers have included Dan Rather, Ellen Goodman, Paul Krugman, Seymour Hersh, John Quiñones, and Gail Collins.

The deadline for entries from the previous calendar year is typically in March and the submissions are screened by journalists from the Board of Advisors, which governs the conducting of the award. Finalists and winners are determined by an annually selected Executive Committee of the Board of Advisors.

The 2013 MOLLY National Journalism Prize was awarded to Sarah Stillman of The New Yorker for her article “The Throwaways,” which addresses the use and abuse of juvenile drug offenders as confidential informants by law enforcement officers.

=== 2014 Board of Advisors ===
Hugh Aynesworth, Maurine H. Beasley, Tom Bettag, Mike Blackman, Frederick Blevens, Roy Blount, Jr., Mary Breasted, Robert Bryce, Ken Bunting, Wanda Cash, Carlton Carl, Mike Cochran, Gail Collins, Patrick Cox, Greg Curtis, Joe Cutbirth, Lou Dubose, Ronnie Dugger, Margaret Engel, James Fallows, Doug Foster, Ellen Goodman, Wade Goodwyn, Patti Kilday Hart, Jim Henderson, Steven Isenberg, Melissa Jones, Lewis Lapham, Myra MacPherson, David McHam, Dave McNeely, Kevin Merida, Judith Davidson Moyers, Victor Navasky, Kaye Northcott, Larry Norwood, Karen Olsson, John Pope, Dan Rather, Matt Rothschild, Ben Sargent, Connie Schultz, Robert Siegel, Erna Smith, Glenn Smith, Paul Stekler, Carlton Stowers, Diane Suchetka, Ellen Sweets, Mimi Swartz, Saralee Tiede, Rusty Todd, Calvin Trillin, Jim Willse and John Young.

== Winners ==
2019: Hannah Dreier, ProPublica

2018: Michael Grabell & Howard Berkes, ProPublica/NPR

2017: Shane Bauer, Mother Jones

2016: Joseph Neff, The News & Observer

2015: Esther Kaplan, the Virginia Quarterly Review

2014: Dave Philipps, The Gazette

2013: Sarah Stillman, The New Yorker

2012: Trevor Aaronson, Mother Jones

2011: Jeff Sharlet, Harper's Magazine

2010: A.C. Thompson, ProPublica

2009: Rick Casey, The Houston Chronicle

2008: Diane Suchetka, The Plain Dealer
