= San Antonio and Aransas Pass Railway =

Railway line in Texas, United States

Overview
- Reporting mark: SA&AP, SAAP
- Locale: Texas
- Dates of operation: 1886–1934
- Successor: Texas and New Orleans Railroad

Technical
- Track gauge: 4 ft 8 1/2 in (1,435 mm) standard gauge

The San Antonio and Aransas Pass Railway first began operation in the U.S. state of Texas in 1886. It was developed by Uriah Lott and businessmen of San Antonio as a direct route from the city to Aransas Bay on the Texas Gulf coast. It was eventually absorbed in the 20th century by Southern Pacific.

== Background ==
Uriah Lott, a transportation entrepreneur, engaged his friends Richard King and contractor Mifflin Kenedy in development of three railroad lines in Texas to improve connections from major cities to smaller ones, and to trading areas in Mexico. The Corpus Christi, San Diego and Rio Grande Narrow Gauge Railroad connected Corpus Christi and Laredo. The St. Louis, Brownsville and Mexico Railway ran from Houston to Brownsville through the Rio Grande Valley and related stops.

Supported by businessmen from San Antonio, the San Antonio and Aransas Pass Railway was developed to connect San Antonio with Aransas Bay on Texas' Gulf coast, where a deepwater port was being developed. Lott, Texas was named in the developer's honor. (After damaging hurricanes in the early 20th century, the US Army Corps of Engineers designated Corpus Christi to be the deep-water port in this area.)

== Line history ==
The San Antonio and Aransas Pass Railway Company was incorporated in 1884, to fulfill the need for a direct railway route from San Antonio to Mexico. Augustus Belknap became president of the company's board of directors, all of whom were also the primary investors, which included William H. Maverick, Edward Stevenson, Edward Katula, Daniel Sullivan, A. J. Lockwood, and George H. Kalteyer, all businessmen based in San Antonio, George Polk was the surveyor. With no progress upon completion of Polk's survey, Belknap was replaced by Lott as president of the board. He gained support in the state legislature from Representative Mifflin Kenedy. Construction began in 1885, and the first train rolled out on the line in 1886. An extension to Boerne, Texas was started on August 26, 1886, and the first passenger train arrived in Boerne on March 12, 1887. The line continued on to the northwest going through Comfort, Texas and, ultimately, reached Kerrville, Texas in August of 1887. The railroad went into receivership in 1890. The receivership was lifted in 1892 after a corporate reorganization whereby Southern Pacific acquired the majority of the stock. The railroad completed a spur line to Fredericksburg, Texas around 1914.

As Section 5 of Article X of the Texas Constitution prohibited common control of parallel railroads, in 1903, the Southern Pacific Railroad was sued by the Texas Railroad Commission. Southern Pacific lost the lawsuit and was compelled to divest itself of ownership of the San Antonio and Aransas Pass Railway. In 1924, a change in statutes allowed Southern Pacific to regain control of the railway. In 1934, the Southern Pacific consolidated the San Antonio and Aransas Pass into their Texas and New Orleans subsidiary road.

== See also ==
- Pinta Trail
