= Robert Lasner =

American novelist

Robert Lasner is the co-founder of Ig Publishing, a publishing company based in Brooklyn, New York. His books include For Fucks Sake, a bildungsroman novel which gained somewhat of a cult following, and The Real Republican Dictionary, a satirical dictionary of the Republican lexicon . Lasner also co-edited Proud to be Liberal, a collection of essays from liberal voices in America. His short story, "Snow Forts," was featured in the anthology, Forgotten Borough: Writers Come to Terms With Queens, published by SUNY Press.

== Bibliography ==
- For Fucks Sake (2002)
- Proud to Be Liberal (editor) (2005)
- The Real Republican Dictionary (2006)
- Forgotten Borough: Writers Come to Terms with Queens (2011)
