= Uriah Lott =

American engineer (1842–1915)

Uriah Lott (1842–1915) was an American engineer who worked on the development of railways. Lott, Texas, is named after him because of his role in bringing the railway through Falls County, Texas. While he was not originally from Texas, he made a large impact on the transportation system throughout the state.

== Life ==
Uriah Lott was born January 30, 1842, in Albany, New York. In his early twenties he moved to Illinois for the Chicago and Alton Railroad. In 1867 he moved from Illinois to Corpus Christi where he found a passion and understanding for railway expansion. Before finding his new passion for railway expansion he owned a small store in Corpus Christi in 1867. He would later go on to work as a county clerk for a brief time as well as becoming a ranch supply salesman. He would go on to start another company of his own in 1869, U.Lott & Company. This company was a commission and forwarding company. After creating his own company his interests shifted to deep water ports. He was interested in securing one at Corpus Christi's port. On June 15, 1871, he joined the board of the Corpus Christi Navigation Company. His goal was to help improve the Corpus Christi ship channel.

== Career ==
Lott first got involved with railway organizations that were planning to create a railroad from Corpus Christi to Mexico. This however, was a slow and expensive process. He oversaw grading of part of the line going from Corpus Christi to Mexico. Due to financial issues, he would sell his share of the railway to the owners of the Mexican National Railway. In 1885 Uriah Lott became president of the SA&AP (San Antonio and Aransas Pass Railway Company). The town of Floresville would be the first to see the railway come through. He would spend his life promoting railways throughout Texas.

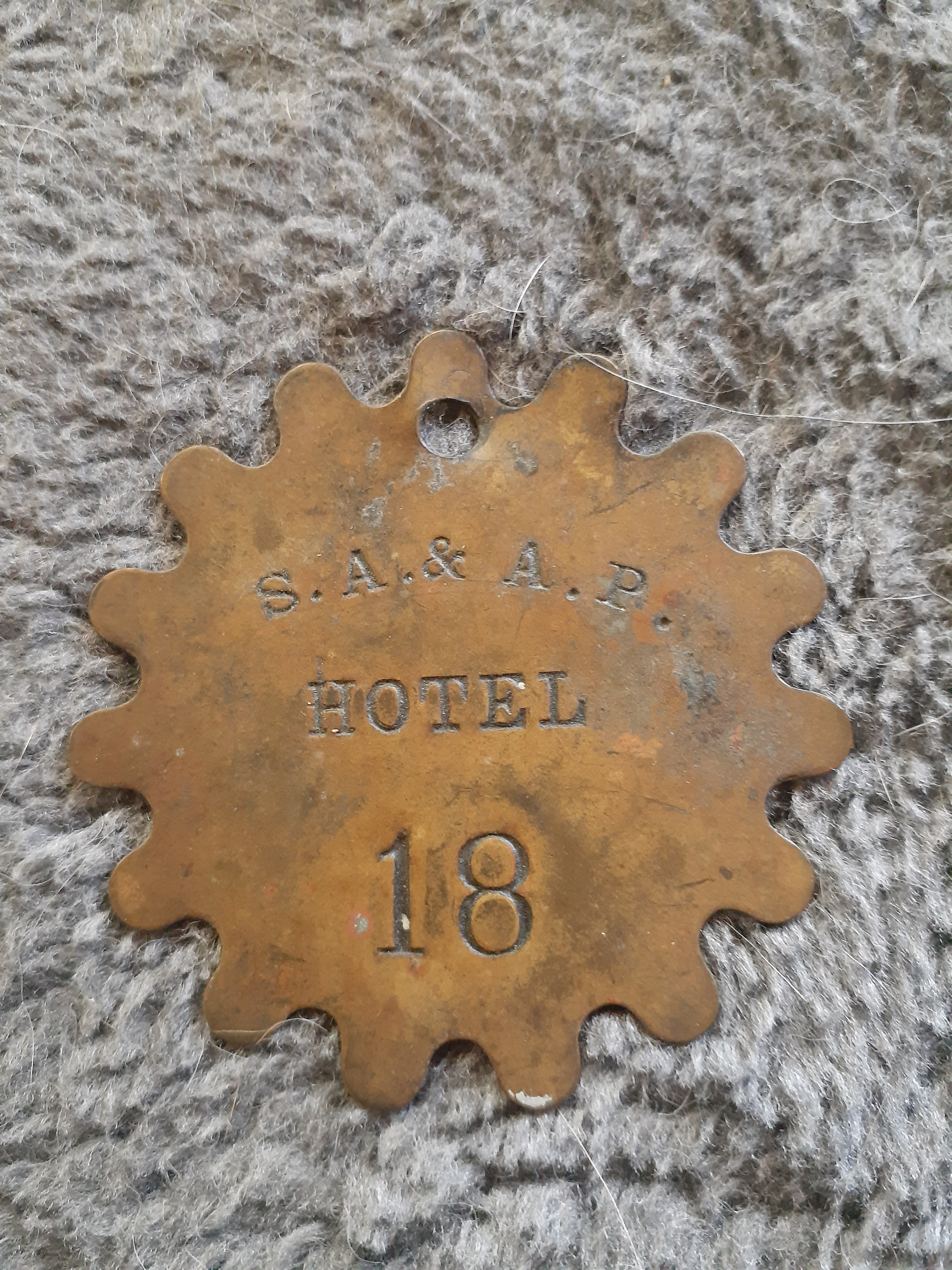
Key fob from the SA&AP hotel in Rosebud, Texas where many workers and corporate elites would stay. There is a great chance that Lott may have stayed at this hotel.

=== San Antonio and Aransas Pass Railway ===
On August 7, 1884, the SA&AP Railway company was organized and elected its first president, A. Belknap. In September 1884 there were a group of men sent to survey possible routes for the new railway system. Two routes were surveyed, one a western route through Beeville, and the other an eastern route through Goliad. Between 1884 and 1885 Lott relocated to San Antonio in determination to complete the SA&AP railway project. In March 1885, Lott became the new president of the SA&AP company. Once Lott had become president, things began to move at a much quicker pace. The first town to see this new railway would be Floresville, however there would be financial issues that would need to be taken care of before moving forward. Mifflin Kenedy stepped up and offered to help Lott with finances to continue building this much needed railway through Texas. Kennedy contracted with the SA&AP to build the line, but in return he would receive bonuses acquired from the towns it would pass through. This immensely helped Lott continue to build. on June 17, 1886, the first train arrived in Beesville. Lott and Miffin decided the line should end in Corpus Christi. On November 8, 1886, the SA&AP formed a Town Site Company to which would handle the development of towns along the rail line. By this time the railway was 149 miles long. The SA&AP would go on to build a Houston line as well as a northwest expansion that would make its way through Kerville Texas.In the spring of 1886 Lott offered to build an extension if the towns the extensions went through the process of securing the necessary right of way. Between 1888 and 1891 a line was constructed that went north to Waco. In February 1989, twenty-eight miles of railway were completed from Waco into Western Falls County. The town that this stretch of railway would extend through was later renamed Lott after him. Completion of the line was made between 1890 and 1891 from Western Falls County to Lexington.

== Death ==
He died in 1915 in a town near Corpus Christi named Kingsville. He is buried in the Chamberlain Cemetery with his wife Cecile Reynolds.

== Legacy ==
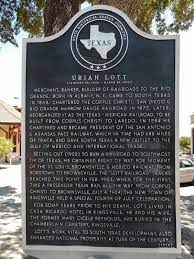
Historical Marker attributed to Uriah Lott and his work with the SA&AP.

=== Historical Marker ===
In 1972 a historical marker was erected in Kingsville Texas by the State Historical Survey Committee. Lott's work was extremely important to the development of southern Texas. He also amplified prosperity throughout the nation with the expansion of the railway throughout southern Texas.

The inscription on the historical marker reads: "Merchant, banker, builder of railroads to the Rio Grande. Born in Albany, N.Y. Came to South Texas in 1868. Chartered the Corpus Christi, San Diego and Rio Grande narrow gauge railroad in 1875. Later, reorganized it as the Texas - Mexican Railroad, to be built from Corpus Christi to Laredo. In 1884 he chartered and became president of the San Antonio and Aransas Pass Railway, which in time had 688 miles of track, and gave South Texas a new outlet to the Gulf of Mexico and international trade.Setting out (1900) to run a railroad to southernmost tip of Texas, he obtained right of way for segment of the St. Louis, Brownsville and Mexico Railway from Robstown to Brownsville. The "Lott Railroad" tracks reached this point in Feb. 1903. When for the first time a passenger train ran all the way from Corpus Christi to Brownsville, July 4, 1904, the new town of Kingsville held a special Fourth of July celebration. For some years prior to his death, Lott lived in Casa Ricardo Hotel in Kingsville. He and his wife, the former Mary Cecile Reynolds, are buried in the Chamberlain Cemetery, Kingsville. Lott's work, vital to South Texas development, also enhanced national prosperity at turn of the century."

=== Lott, Texas ===
When the railway made its way through Western Falls the city was renamed in honor of Lott. The previous city name would then become the county name. Lott Texas is in Western Falls County, about 40 miles southeast of Waco.
