= Hugh Aynesworth =

American journalist (1931–2023)

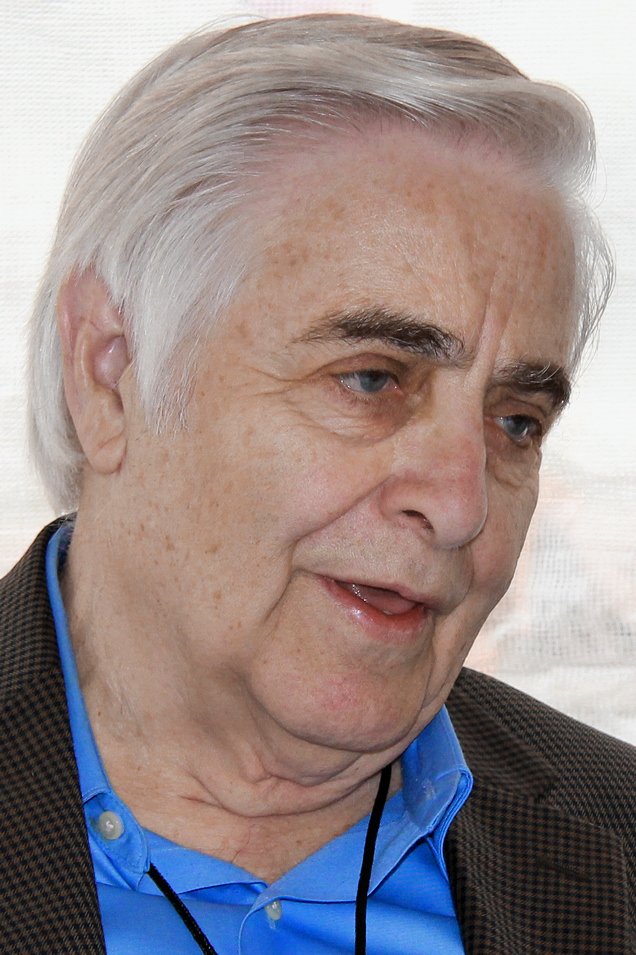
- Aynesworth at the 2013 Texas Book Festival
- Born: Hugh Grant Aynesworth; August 2, 1931; Clarksburg, West Virginia, U.S.
- Died: December 23, 2023 (aged 92); Dallas, Texas, U.S.
- Education: Roosevelt-Wilson High School; Salem College
- Occupations: Journalist; reporter; author; teacher
- Writing career
- Genre: Non-fiction

Hugh Grant Aynesworth (/ˈeɪnzwɜːrθ/; August 2, 1931 – December 23, 2023) was an American journalist, investigative reporter, author, and teacher. Aynesworth was reported to have witnessed the assassination of John F. Kennedy in Dealey Plaza, the capture and arrest of Lee Harvey Oswald at the Texas Theatre, and the shooting of Oswald by Jack Ruby in the basement of the Dallas Police Headquarters. In a 1976 Texas Monthly article, William Broyles Jr. described Aynesworth as "one of the most respected authorities on the assassination of John F. Kennedy".

== Background ==
Aynesworth was a native of Clarksburg, West Virginia. Having grown up poor, his mother helped provide for the family by taking in laundry and his aunt cleaned houses, including one owned by a man who would later provide him with $100 so he could purchase books in college. Aynesworth graduated from Roosevelt-Wilson High School in Nutter Fort, West Virginia, then attended Salem College in Salem, West Virginia before dropping out after one semester to work in journalism full-time.

== Journalism ==
Aynesworth started as a newspaperman in 1948. He first worked in his home state as a freelancer for the Clarksburg Exponent-Telegram.

Aynesworth's next two positions were with Donald W. Reynolds-owned newspapers in Fort Smith, Arkansas. From 1950 to 1954, he was a sports editor for the Fort Smith Times Record making $32/week. At the age of 23, he was then hired as managing editor of the Southwest American. According to Aynesworth, at that time he may have been the youngest managing editor of a daily newspaper in the United States. He also conducted his first interview with a murderer while working at the American. In 1957, Aynesworth left the American after a dispute with Reynolds regarding compensation.

Aynesworth was a business writer for the Dallas Times Herald at 26, then was hired to work for United Press International in their Denver, Colorado news bureau in 1959. While in Denver, he was stabbed in the throat by an unknown man who broke down his apartment door one night. Those who speculated on the motivation for the attack believed Aynesworth may have been targeted in a case of mistaken identity or by a jealous husband. Aynesworth himself reported he thought that the Teamsters may have been involved due to a story on which the UPI was working at the time. While still bandaged from the attack, he interviewed and was hired by the Dallas Morning News in 1960.

Aynesworth covered the United States space program for the Dallas Morning News as a space and aviation reporter, a position he held at the time of the Kennedy assassination in 1963. (Note: Aynesworth also described the position he held in November 1963 as "science editor".) In 1967, he started for Newsweek in their Houston bureau, where he eventually succeeded Philip Carter as head of that bureau. Returning to the Dallas Times Herald where he first began working in the 1950s, Aynesworth was an investigative chief in 1975.

At ABC News, Aynesworth was an investigator for 20/20. In the mid-1990s, he was the Dallas/Southwest bureau chief of The Washington Times. In 2007, Aynesworth was elected President of the 300-member Press Club of Dallas, an organization of which he had been a member since the early 1960s. He served on the board of directors for The Texas Observer's MOLLY National Journalism Prize.

Aynesworth was nominated for a Pulitzer Prize six times, and was a finalist four times.

== 1963: the Kennedy assassination ==
According to Aynesworth, he was scheduled to interview a scientist at Southern Methodist University on November 22, 1963. He said that he saw Jack Ruby around 11:30 that morning in the employee's cafeteria of the Dallas Morning News before Ruby went upstairs to place an advertisement for his nightclub. Aynesworth said he decided to take a long lunch hour and walk over to watch Kennedy's motorcade from in front of the Dallas County Records Building. With the crowds two to three people deep on Main Street, he positioned himself in the middle of Elm Street on the corner of Elm and North Houston Street to obtain a clearer view. (Note: Aynesworth stated that he had watched the motorcade with an assistant district attorney and another lawyer.)

Aynesworth described hearing a first shot as possibly backfire from a motorcycle, and recognizing a second and a third shot as coming from a rifle. He described the scene immediately afterwards as "total chaos". Aynesworth reported that activity converged upon the Texas School Book Depository, and that he did not enter the building possibly for fear of running into a gunman. He said he started interviewing people and, as he was without paper, began taking notes on a "bunch of envelopes" he had in his pocket. According to Aynesworth, he interviewed people in the area and received information that turned out to be false or contradicted the statements of other witnesses. Aynesworth positioned himself near a three-wheeled police motorcycle in front of the Texas School Book Depository to listen to the voice traffic and find out what was happening. He stated that police radio transmissions, as well as the number of police entering the building, gave him the impression that a gunman was on the building's roof.

Aynesworth described listening to the police radio and hearing what turned out to be the first report of the shooting of J. D. Tippit in the Oak Cliff section of Dallas by a citizen using the radio in Tippit's police car.

Aynesworth said he instructed another reporter to stay at the Texas School Book Depository and followed the police to the scene of the shooting in a WFAA mobile unit. He was with the police when they entered the Texas Theater searching for Oswald, and he saw Oswald's attempt to shoot Officer Nick McDonald. Two days later, Aynesworth was talked into going to the Dallas Police Headquarters by his wife and then saw Ruby lunge and shoot Oswald.

In the aftermath of the events in November 1963, Aynesworth became an investigative reporter who was reported to have "broken almost every major assassination story". He worked on the story for some time after Kennedy was shot and became the lead reporter for the Dallas Morning News regarding the assassination. Aynesworth broke the story of Oswald's escape route, and had the first major interview with Marina Oswald. Having not told it to the Warren Commission, Marina had told him that she persuaded Oswald not to assassinate Richard Nixon. Aynesworth, to the consternation of the Warren Commission, also obtained and published the Oswald diaries.

Aynesworth was reported to have spent much of his career attempting to refute conspiracy theories surrounding the assassination. He supported the official conclusion that Oswald acted alone and believed that conspiracy theories had been generated by people motivated by money and fame. In an interview in 1979 on KERA, the Dallas PBS affiliate, he said, "I'm not saying there wasn't a conspiracy. I know most people in this country believe there was a conspiracy. I just refuse to accept it and that's my life's work."

== 1967: the Jim Garrison investigation ==
In 1967, Aynesworth had just begun working in Newsweek's Houston bureau at the time of the Jim Garrison investigation. He said Garrison invited him to New Orleans to "compare notes". According to Aynesworth, "[Garrison] was paranoid as hell, but he was no fool." Described as Garrison's "nemesis", he worked openly with Clay Shaw's attorneys to defend Shaw against Garrison. Irvin Dymond characterized Aynesworth's help in the case as "crucial".

In the May 15, 1967, issue of Newsweek, Aynesworth wrote: "Jim Garrison is right. There has been a conspiracy in New Orleans – but it is a plot of Garrison's own making." According to Aynesworth, Garrison fabricated conspiracy allegations for "politically opportunistic reasons" and had attempted to bribe potential witnesses. Garrison initially replied only that the article was "unworthy of comment", but later provided a more substantive reply in the October 1967 issue of Playboy. Garrison himself later responded to Aynesworth's claims: "As for the $3,000 bribe, by the time I came across Aynesworth's revelation, the witness our office had supposedly offered it to, Alvin Babeouf, had admitted to us that it never happened."

In May 1967, researcher Shirley Martin wrote a letter to Jim Garrison about her 1964 meeting with Aynesworth, in which she accused him of making "disgusting anti-Kennedy stories." He then began to praise the city of Dallas, especially his newspaper the Morning News. He then personally smeared Warren Commission critics like Thomas Buchanan and Mark Lane; describing the former as a "fairy" and the latter as a communist. Aynesworth also said that he had an affair with Marina, even commenting that Marina and Ruth Paine were involved in a lesbian relationship prior to the assassination. Martin also said that Aynesworth was bitter about Merriman Smith winning the Pulitzer for his JFK coverage. Aynesworth was reportedly offered to snitch on William Walter for the FBI. There is a CIA internal memo written on October 10, 1963, by then-Dallas CIA head J. Walton Moore. He writes about Aynesworth's possible trip to Cuba when he was a reporter with The Dallas Morning News, and how Aynesworth "has offered his services to us if it develops that he receives a visa" to Cuba. Moore wrote that Aynesworth "told me that he had applied for a visa for Cuba approximately a year ago," and that Aynesworth had received a call from someone with the Czech embassy saying it was under consideration. Moore added that he was "submitting a name check request for Aynesworth.”

Aynesworth was very critical of Garrison throughout the years. Addressing a 1991 article written by Mark Seal that discussed Garrison's influence on Oliver Stone's JFK, Ayensworth said: "There is simply no way that a rational person – with any knowledge of Mr. Garrison and his background – could believe that he really knew anything about the assassination that he didn't read first in the very publications he now mocks." In a 1998 interview, Aynesworth said: "Garrison was one of the sickest people that I've ever known. There's no doubt in my mind that the man was insane! Despite being brilliant in many ways, he knew the arts, famous things in history, and he was learned. The man was a devious, nasty man who committed more crimes in his investigation than anybody that he ever accused."

== 1980: Ted Bundy ==
In 1980, Stephen Michaud, a former Business Week reporter, enlisted the help of Aynesworth in interviewing serial killer Ted Bundy, who initially claimed he was innocent and was interested in cooperating on a book. The two Newsweek colleagues conducted a series of interviews with Bundy and eventually authored two books about the killer. The New York Daily News called their portrait of Bundy, The Only Living Witness, one of the ten best true-crime books ever written. Their second book on the subject, Conversations with a Killer, contained edited transcripts of the interviews.

== 1986: Henry Lee Lucas ==
In 1986, Aynesworth and Jim Henderson, also of the Dallas Times Herald, were named as finalists for the Pulitzer Prize for Investigative Reporting "[f]or their persistent and thorough investigation of self-proclaimed mass murderer Henry Lee Lucas, which exposed him as the perpetrator of a massive hoax." Their work showed that Lucas could not have killed more than a hundred people that the Texas Rangers claimed he had. Aynesworth and Henderson's work led to then-Governor George W. Bush commuting Lucas' death sentence.

== 1993: Waco siege ==
In 1993, Aynesworth covered the siege of the Branch Davidian compound in Waco, Texas, once referring to it as "[t]he Branch Davidian massacre". Commenting on the event in an interview, he said: "I couldn't believe I stood there and watched people burn in that. I couldn't believe what was happening."

== Other ==
Aynesworth was reported to have "interviewed John F. Kennedy in the shower [and] Lyndon B. Johnson in bed". According to one report: "He also tracked down the person who stole "most of" eccentric billionaire Howard Hughes' money, chased James Earl Ray all over the South and into Canada after he shot the Rev. Martin Luther King Jr." According to Aynesworth, he was asked to serve as a pallbearer for Jack Ruby and played basketball with Fidel Castro. He said that he was playing outside of Havana: "And all of a sudden, this Jeep drives up and a bearded gentleman gets out and puts on his tennis shoes and joins us. I'd been having trouble getting an interview, and after that, it came a little easier. I told him that I would let him win."

Recapping his career, Aynesworth stated in one interview: "I've been offered bribes and threatened and maligned and witnessed some of the most horrifying events of our lifetime."

== Author ==
Aynesworth co-authored seven books with Stephen G. Michaud. His 2003 book JFK: Breaking the News is "a companion piece to a documentary on the 40th anniversary of the event."

== Later life and death ==
Later in life, Aynesworth lived in Dallas. He died on December 23, 2023, at the age of 92.

== Bibliography ==
- Stephen G. Michaud & Hugh Aynesworth (1983). The Only Living Witness. New York: Linden Press/Simon & Schuster. ISBN 9780671449612.
- Stephen G. Michaud & Hugh Aynesworth (1990). Wanted for Murder. New York: Penguin. ISBN 9780451169273.
- Stephen G. Michaud & Hugh Aynesworth (1990). If You Love Me You Will Do My Will. New York: Penguin. ISBN 9780451170354.
- Stephen G. Michaud & Hugh Aynesworth (1991). Murderers Among Us: Unsolved Homicides, Mysterious Deaths and Killers at Large. New York: Penguin. ISBN 9780451170576.
- Stephen G. Michaud & Hugh Aynesworth (2000). The Vengeful Heart. Irving, Texas: Authorlink Press. ISBN 9781928704225.
- Stephen G. Michaud & Hugh Aynesworth (2000). Ted Bundy: Conversations with a Killer. Irving, Texas: Authorlink Press. ISBN 9781928704171.
- Hugh Aynesworth & Stephen G. Michaud (2003). JFK: Breaking the News. Richardson, Texas: International Focus Press. ISBN 9780963910363.

== See also ==
- Sarita Kenedy East, the central figure in If You Love Me You Will Do My Will
