= 2009–2011 detention of American hikers by Iran =

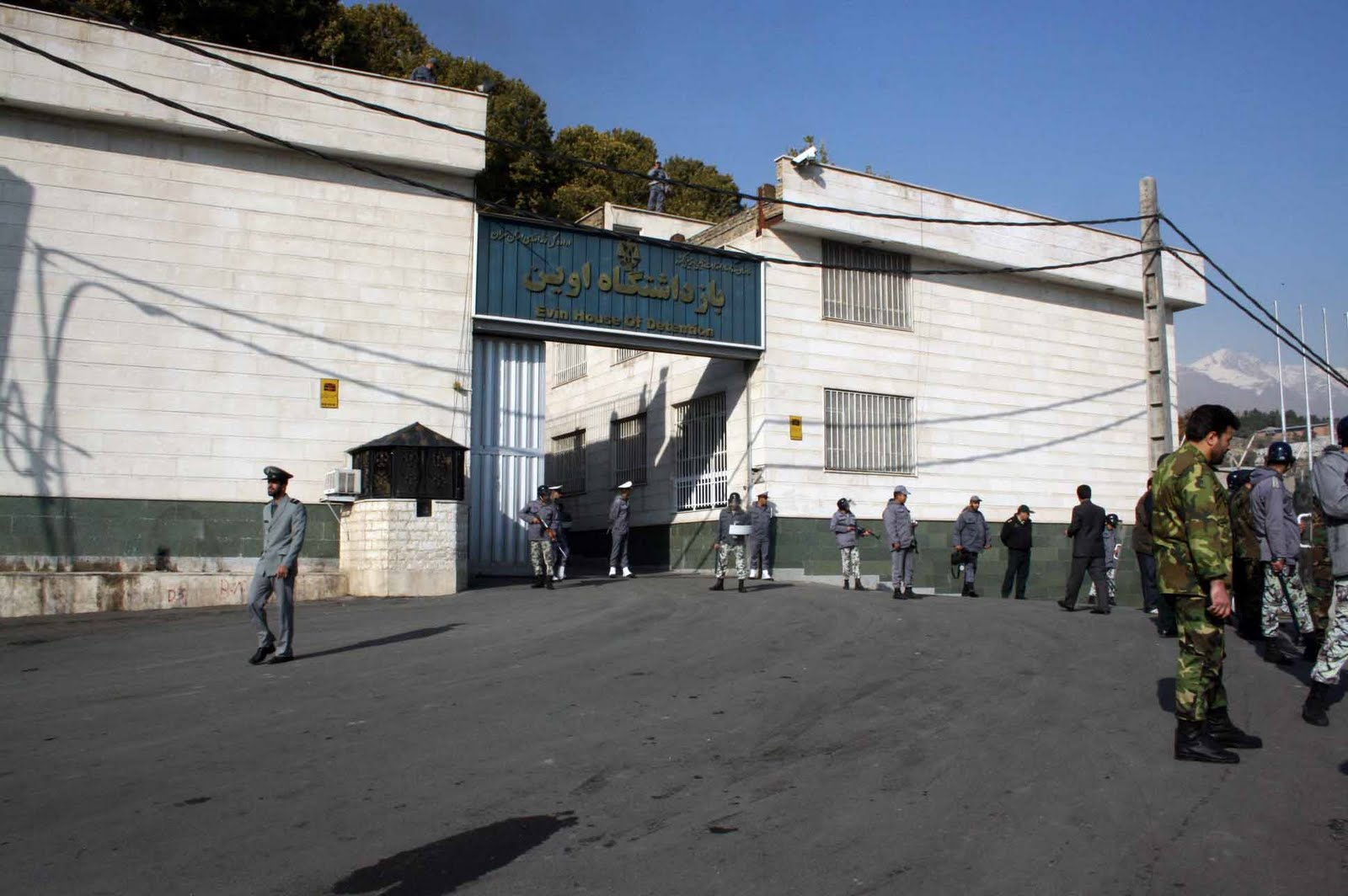
Evin House of Detention, where the hikers were held

On July 31, 2009, three Americans, Joshua Fattal, Sarah Shourd and Shane Bauer were taken into custody by Iranian border guards for crossing into Iran while hiking near the Iranian border in Iraqi Kurdistan.

At the time of their detention by Iranian troops, the three Americans were on vacation from their jobs in the region in a relatively stable, autonomous region of Iraq known as Iraqi Kurdistan. On the recommendations of locals, they hiked to see a popular local Iraqi tourist destination near the Iraq-Iran border, the Ahmed Awa waterfall.

Following the hikers' capture on the Iraqi-Iranian border, a wide range of outside voices, including the Secretary-General of the United Nations, Ban Ki-moon, and the human rights group Amnesty International, had called for the hikers' unconditional release.

Iran subsequently claimed the three were spies but offered no evidence to support its contention.

Sarah Shourd was released 14 months later on "humanitarian grounds". Fattal and Bauer were convicted of "illegal entry" and "espionage" two years after their arrest and each sentenced to eight years in prison, but were released on September 21, 2011. Each of the detainees was released after payment of 5 billion rial (around US$471000) bail was arranged by the Sultan of Oman.

== Background ==
Joshua "Josh" Fattal, who grew up in Elkins Park, Pennsylvania, graduated from UC Berkeley, worked as co-director of an environmental education center at Aprovecho in Oregon and travelled to Switzerland, India, China, and South Africa from January to May 2009 on a fellowship with the International Honors Program (IHP)'s "Health and Community" study abroad program. Fattal and Bauer were friends from their days at the University of California at Berkeley. Shortly after the release of the hikers, it was revealed that Jacob Fattal, the father of Joshua Fattal, is an Israeli expatriate living in the United States. To avoid revealing the fact that Josh's father is an Israeli citizen, and that half his family are Israelis, Josh's mother and brother, Alex Fattal, spearheaded the campaign for his release and his father avoided the media. Fattal had been to Israel on a few family visits. The last time Fattal was in Israel was 2007 for two weeks for his cousin's wedding.

Shane Bauer, who grew up both in Onamia, Minnesota and San Leandro, California, is a freelance photojournalist and journalist who has reported for Democracy Now!, Mother Jones, The Nation, The Christian Science Monitor, the San Francisco Chronicle, the Los Angeles Times and other media outlets, using his fluency in Arabic.

Sarah Emily Shourd, who grew up in Los Angeles, worked in education and social justice in Damascus, Syria, where she provided educational opportunities to refugees from the war in Iraq and taught English. Shourd was Bauer's girlfriend at the time of the arrest, and the two became engaged to be married while imprisoned. They married on May 5, 2012, in Half Moon Bay, California, in a private ceremony with friends and family.

== Arrest ==
On July 31, 2009, Fattal, Shourd, and Bauer were detained by Iranian border guards while hiking in Iraqi Kurdistan. Iran claims the three crossed into its territory. The three sometimes dispute and sometimes accept this claim.

The three American detainees have claimed they were simply hikers who did not realize that they were in Iran and that they actually have lengthy backgrounds as social justice activists. They had been living and active in the Middle East, and were on holiday in Iraqi Kurdistan, an autonomous region of Iraq free from the sectarian struggle that dominates much of Iraq. They had been advised of the suitability of the region for a holiday by friends who had been there and through Internet research; and were recommended the Ahmed Awa waterfall, a popular Kurdish tourist destination, by a number of local people whilst they were in Sulaymaniyah. After visiting the waterfall, they continued walking in Iraqi Kurdistan until they unknowingly walked along the unmarked Iraq-Iran borderline, at times stepping just feet into Iran.

In June 2010, an article in The Nation indicated that two villagers said the hikers were accosted by Iranian authorities while they were on the Iraqi side of the border.

Their companion, Shon Meckfessel, was not detained, as he stayed behind at the Hotel Miwan in Sulaymaniyah because of a cold. He had intended to join them the following day.

== Detention ==
External videos
- Discussion with Bauer, Fattal, and Shourd on A Sliver of Light, March 21, 2014, C-SPAN

The exact circumstances of their detention are unknown, but is illustrated in the first person by each of the three in their book, A Sliver of Light, released March 18, 2014. They were held in Evin Prison, section 209. The three were in solitary confinement for the first four months. Bauer and Shourd could communicate during the first month, but Fattal was totally isolated. Shourd remained in solitary confinement after Fattal and Bauer were put in the same cell at which point the three spent time together each day for two 30-minute periods.

Beside a five-minute phone call in March, 2010, the three detainees were not allowed to communicate with their families until May, 2010. Swiss consular officials were able to visit them on September 29 and October 29, 2009, and confirmed they did not appear to have been physically mistreated (Switzerland represents U.S. interests in Iran because the United States has no formal diplomatic relations with Iran). Upon the release of Fattal and Bauer on September 25, 2011, Shourd stated, "Bauer was beaten and Fattal forced down a flight of stairs." In their memoir, Bauer states that he was not beaten but rather severely threatened.

The mothers of the three applied for visas in January 2010 to visit their sons and daughter. They went to Iran in May 2010, after the government granted the visas. The three were united with their mothers for two days in May 2010 while remaining in detention.

Shane Bauer and Sarah Shourd, who were already in a relationship when they were detained, became engaged while incarcerated and married after their release.

== Release of Sarah Shourd ==
On September 14, 2010, after more than a year in prison, Sarah Shourd was released on 5 billion rial (about US$465,000) bail, paid by the Sultan of Oman. Iran's judiciary also announced that the pre-trial detention of Fattal and Bauer would be extended for two more months, at that time. Shourd remained a defendant but was not required by Iran to return for trial along with Fattal and Bauer in 2011.

Iran officials stated she was released on humanitarian grounds due to her declining health. She suffered mental health deterioration due to her solitary confinement for such an extended period of time. Shourd's bail did not require that she remain in Iran, but her case would still go to trial along with Fattal and Bauer. Shourd's mother has said she had been denied treatment for serious health problems, including a breast lump and precancerous cervical cells. In May 2011, Shourd announced that she would not return to Iran for trial, citing acute ill-health. Her lump turned out to be non-cancerous, however it offered a way out of returning.

== Trial ==
On July 31, 2011, Fattal and Bauer were tried by the Revolutionary Court of the Islamic Republic of Iran. On August 20, 2011, they were convicted of "illegal entry" and "espionage" and sentenced to a total of eight years in prison, each.

"According to an informed source with the judiciary, Shane Bauer and Josh Fattal, the two detained American citizens, have been each sentenced to three years in prison for illegal entry to the Islamic Republic of Iran," the Iran's state television website reported. It also stated that the two have separately been "sentenced to five years in prison on charges of espionage for the American intelligence agency".

Their Iranian attorney, Masoud Shafiee, thought "the sentence was not consistent with the charges." Illegal entry rarely has such a harsh punishment and spying can carry a death sentence in Iran.

=== Iranian judicial process ===
President Ahmadinejad stated his hope that the three would be able to prove their innocence of espionage, but stated they deserve at least some punishment for illegal entry into Iran.

In September 2009, Ahmadinejad promised that he would ask the judiciary to treat the case with maximum lenience and expeditiously, but despite many public statements that a judicial proceeding was imminent there was no hearing or movement on their case for nearly eight months. On November 9, 2009, it was announced they would be charged for espionage by Iranian authorities. The detainees were consistently denied access to their lawyer and Swiss officials were stonewalled. On February 15, 2009 [2010?] Mohammad Javad Larijani, the secretary general of Iran's High Council for Human Rights, said it was "quite possible" the Americans had strayed into Iran by mistake.

At the beginning of August 2010, the Iranian government reiterated its belief that the trio should stand trial for illegal entry, and announced it was considering other charges such as "intentionally acting against Iranian security". On July 31, 2011, the two had their final hearing of the trial. On August 20, 2011, the two hikers were sentenced to 3 years for illegal entry and 5 years for espionage, a total of 8 years.

== Calls for release ==
Kenan Thompson, Desmond Tutu, Muhammad Ali, Noam Chomsky, Tom Morello, Alyssa Milano, Ashton Kutcher, Barack Obama, Big Sean, Yusuf Islam, Sean Penn, along with many other celebrities and governments, called for the release of the detainees on grounds of inhumane treatment and lack of evidence.

== Release of Fattal and Bauer ==
A team of United States Department of State officials, including diplomat Philo Dibble, coordinated with Omani and Swiss diplomats to secure the release of Fattal and Bauer.

On September 13, 2011, Iranian President Mahmoud Ahmadinejad told NBC News that Fattal and Bauer would be released "in a couple of days" in a "humanitarian gesture". Ahmadinejad was scheduled to speak at the United Nations General Assembly the next week. However the release was delayed as part of "what analysts called a power struggle between Ahmadinejad and the conservative establishment he has angered," and soon after the announcement, Iran's judiciary contradicted the president and stated it had exclusive authority to order their release. (The judiciary answers to the country's supreme leader.) Fattal and Bauer were released on September 21 and taken by a diplomatic convoy to a plane that took them to Oman.

Shafiei said the bail of 5 billion rial (about US$465,000) for each of the men was posted, and they would be released into the custody of either Swiss diplomats or an Omani delegation. Omani officials, who maintain good relations with both Iran and the U.S., reportedly played a key role in negotiations with Iran and may have paid the almost $1 million bail.

The two men were released from prison and flown back to the United States via Oman on September 21, 2011, following a 10 billion rial (about US$930,000) bail-for-freedom deal posted by Oman.

Once Fattal and Bauer were back on American soil, the Israeli newspaper Haaretz reported that Joshua Fattal's Iraqi-born Jewish father, Jacob, had emigrated to Israel as a child and later came to the United States, where he married Fattal's mother, Laura. In an effort not to draw attention to their ties with Israel after Josh's arrest, the family decided that rather than having his father involved in public efforts for Josh's release, the task would go to Josh's brother, Alex, a doctoral student at Harvard University, and to Josh's mother, Laura, who was born in the United States.

== Aftermath ==
As early as 2009, according to WikiLeaks, Oman offered to arrange secret talks between the US and Iran, which hadn't had diplomatic relations for 30 years. But it was the detention of the American hikers by Iran that brought Oman into a mediating role between the two sides and helped win the release of the detainees. Ironically, efforts to win the release of the hikers turned out to be instrumental in making the clandestine diplomacy to reach an agreement on the nuclear program of Iran possible: after this successful mediation, Sultan Qaboos offered to facilitate a US–Iran rapprochement. In March, US and Iranian officials met in Oman, Secretary of State John Kerry followed up in May, and the talks took on a momentum of their own after Hassan Rouhani replaced Mahmoud Ahmadinejad in Iran's June elections.

The memoir A Sliver of Light is about the event.

== See also ==
- List of foreign nationals detained in Iran
- Deportation of the Iranian students at US airports
