= Masoud Shafiee =

Iranian lawyer

Masoud Shafiee is an Iranian lawyer. He is best known for serving as the attorney for three American hikers that were detained in Iran from July 2009 to September 2011. His specialty is representing clients in Iran with American-linked legal problems. Since the release of the Americans, Shafiee has been briefly arrested, interrogated and had his passport confiscated by the Iranian authorities.

== Detention of the American hikers ==
Shafiee was the legal representative for Josh Fattal, Shane Bauer and Sarah Shourd, three Americans that were detained by Iranian security forces in July 2009 while hiking in an unmarked border area between Iraqi Kurdistan and Iran. While Sarah Shourd was released in September 2010 on humanitarian grounds, Iranian authorities did not free Bauer and Fattal until a year later in September 2011.

Shafiee always maintained the three were innocent despite receiving condemnation from conservative hardliners in the Iranian regime. The Iranian lawyer also criticized the Iranian judiciary for denying him proper access to his clients, as required by Iranian law. Over the course of two years representing the Americans, he only met them three times: once before the start of the trial and once before each of their hearings, in February and August 2011. Each meeting was brief.

Fattal and Bauer, after they were released, thanked Shafiee and others who had helped them regain their freedom. Fattal said their attorney "was never allowed to represent us properly, but he never gave up."

== Arrest and interrogation ==
Following the release of the two remaining American hikers, Iranian security forces raided the Shafiee's home in late September 2011. They searched his apartment, seizing his files and his computer's hard drive. He was sent to Evin Prison, his clients' former location, where he was briefly questioned but eventually released. Regarding the raid, Shafiee said, "Even though they [the security forces] were respectful, this act was wrong in essence."

In early October 2011, Agence France-Presse reported that Shafiee was barred from leaving the country and had his passport confiscated. The incident occurred when the Iranian lawyer was boarding a flight with his ultimate destination being the United States.

== See also ==
- Mohammad Ali Dadkhah
