= Shane Bauer =

American journalist

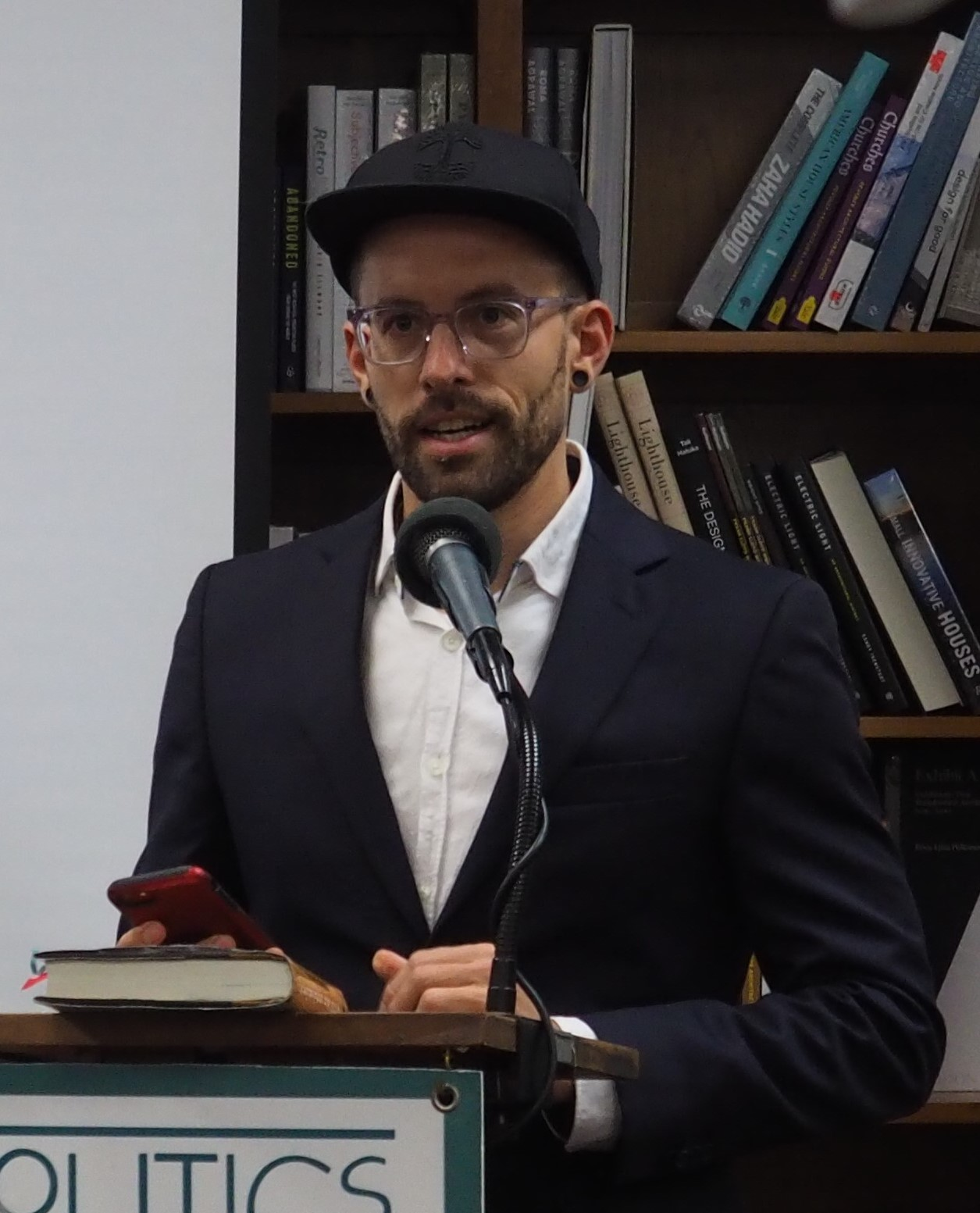
- Education: University of California, Berkeley
- Occupation: Journalist
- Writing career
- Notable awards: Goldsmith Prize for Investigative Reporting (2017); Michael Kelly Award (2017); MOLLY National Journalism Prize (2017)

Shane Bauer is an American journalist, best known for his undercover reporting for Mother Jones magazine. He has won several awards including the Harvard's Goldsmith Prize for Investigative Reporting and the National Magazine Award for Best Reporting.

== Life ==
Bauer grew up in Onamia, Minnesota and he is a graduate of the University of California, Berkeley in peace and conflict studies.

In July 2009, Bauer and two companions (Joshua Fattal and Sarah Shourd) were arrested by Iranian border guards after straying into Iran while allegedly hiking in northern Iraq near the Iranian border. The three Americans were held in prison in Iran on espionage charges for more than two years before their release in September 2011. They subsequently co-authored a memoir of their experience (A Sliver of Light), as well as the cover story ("Kidnapped by Iran") for the March–April 2014 issue of Mother Jones magazine.

Bauer has worked as a foreign correspondent, reporting from Iraq, Sudan, Chad, Syria, Lebanon, and Yemen. His work has appeared in The Nation, Salon.com, the Los Angeles Times, the Christian Science Monitor, and The New Yorker.

In 2015 he worked as an undercover journalist for Mother Jones while employed for six months as a prison guard at the Winn Correctional Center, a private prison in Winn Parish, Louisiana managed by the Corrections Corporation of America (now known as CoreCivic).

In 2016, he took on another undercover news assignment for Mother Jones, infiltrating Three Percent United Patriots, a right-wing border militia in southern Arizona.

== Works ==
=== Books ===
Year	Title
2014	A Sliver of Light: Three Americans Imprisoned in Iran
2018	American Prison: A Reporter's Undercover Journey into the Business of Punishment

== Awards ==
Year	Title
2012	James Aronson Award
2013	Hillman Prize for Magazine Journalism
2013	Media for a Just Society Awards
2017	John Jay College/Harry Frank Guggenheim Award for Excellence in Criminal Justice Reporting
2017	Goldsmith Prize for Investigative Reporting
2017	Michael Kelly Award
2017	Izzy Award
2017	MOLLY National Journalism Prize
2019	Helen Bernstein Book Award For Excellence In Journalism

== Fellowships ==
Year	Title
2016	MacDowell Fellowship
2017	Logan Nonfiction Program Fellowship

== See also ==
- List of foreign nationals detained in Iran
