= Trevor Aaronson =

American journalist

- Occupation: Journalist
- Website: TrevorAaronson.com

Trevor Aaronson is an American journalist. He is a contributing writer at The Intercept and author of The Terror Factory: Inside the FBI's Manufactured War on Terrorism, a book that drew national attention for its critical examination of the FBI's use of informants in domestic counterterrorism operations and was widely cited in discussions of post-9/11 law enforcement practices. He was a 2020 ASU Future Security Fellow at New America and a 2015 TED Fellow.

Aaronson received a 2024 Peabody Award for Pulse: The Untold Story, an Audible audio documentary that examined how the Federal Bureau of Investigation (FBI) disseminated inaccurate information about the 2016 Pulse nightclub shooting to obscure its failure to prevent the attack. He has also produced several other Audible Original series, including American ISIS, which chronicles the life of Russell Dennison, an American who joined the Islamic State as a fighter in Syria; Into the Madness, which investigates the connection between conspiracy theories and mass violence, focusing on a shooting during a Fourth of July parade near Chicago; and Hold Fast, co-produced with Sam Eifling and Michael Mooney, which explores the development of adult advertising in alternative weekly newspapers and its transition to the website Backpage.com.

In January 2023, Aaronson launched the podcast series Alphabet Boys. The first season, titled "Trojan Hearse," detailed an FBI operation that infiltrated the Black Lives Matter movement in Denver, Colorado, following the murder of George Floyd in May 2020, using tactics reminiscent of the COINTELPRO era. The second season, "Up in Arms," focused on a U.S. Drug Enforcement Administration narcoterrorism sting that targeted a former FBI informant who claimed to be affiliated with the Central Intelligence Agency.

In addition to the Peabody Award, Aaronson has received the Molly National Journalism Prize, the Data Journalism Award, the John Jay College/Harry Frank Guggenheim Excellence in Criminal Justice Reporting Award, as well as honors from the Online Journalism Awards and the National Headliner Awards.

== Works ==
- The Terror Factory: Inside the FBI's Manufactured War on Terrorism, Ig Publishing, 2013, ISBN 978-1935439615
