= Nueces Strip =

Area in South Texas

The Nueces Strip or Wild Horse Desert is the area of South Texas between the Nueces River and the Rio Grande.

According to the narrative of Spanish missionary Juan Agustín Morfi, there were so many wild horses swarming in the Nueces Strip in 1777 "that their trails make the country, utterly uninhabited by people, look as if it were the most populated in the world".

In the 1830s, the Republic of Texas claimed the Rio Grande as its southern border; Mexico claimed the Nueces River (150 mi or 240 km north of the Rio Grande). The area between the two rivers became known as the Nueces Strip. Both countries invaded it, but neither controlled it nor settled it.

It was the scene of the first fighting in the Mexican–American War in 1846. In the Treaty of Guadalupe Hidalgo, signed in 1848, Mexico ceded the Nueces Strip to the U.S.

Ever since 1848 the border area has had a reputation for lawlessness and smuggling, and was a main zone of activity of the Texas Rangers. It was also used by enslaved people fleeing on the lesser-known southern route of the Underground Railroad.

== Mexican–American War ==
U.S. President James K. Polk ordered General Zachary Taylor and his forces south to the Rio Grande, entering the Nueces Strip. The U.S. claimed the land citing the 1836 Treaties of Velasco. Mexico rejected the treaties and refused to negotiate; it claimed all of Texas. Taylor ignored Mexican demands to withdraw to the Nueces. He constructed a makeshift fort (later known as Fort Brown/Fort Texas) on the banks of the Rio Grande opposite the city of Matamoros, Tamaulipas.

Mexican forces under General Mariano Arista prepared for war. On April 25, 1846, a 2,000-strong Mexican cavalry detachment attacked a 70-man U.S. patrol that had been sent into the contested territory north of the Rio Grande and south of the Nueces River. In the Thornton Affair, the Mexican cavalry routed the patrol, killing 16 American soldiers.
