= Michael Semanchik =

American wrongful conviction advocate

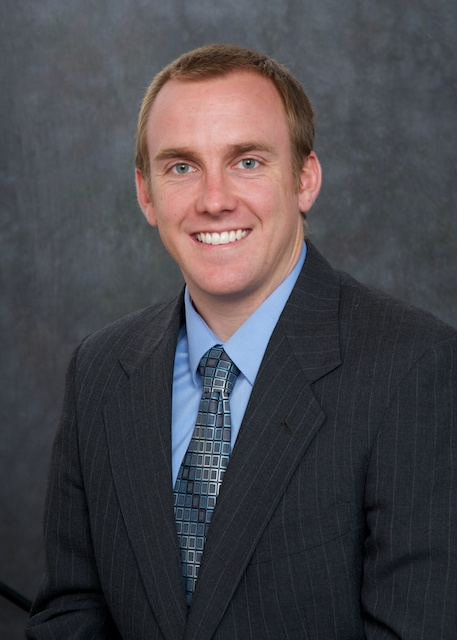
- Born: Pittsburgh, Pennsylvania
- Education: Duquesne University, Pittsburgh, PA (B.S.)
- Alma mater: California Western School of Law (CWSL) (J.D. with honors)
- Occupation: Lawyer
- Years active: 2008-Present
- Employer: California Western School of Law
- Organization: California Innocence Project
- Known for: Legal exoneration of convicted prisoners Prison reform advocate
- Title: Managing Attorney
- Children: 2
- Awards: California Lawyer Attorney of the Year (2013); Top Attorney, San Diego Daily Transcript (2014) (See Honors, presentations and publications section below)

Michael "Mike" Semanchik is the Executive Director of The Innocence Center (TIC) and former Managing Attorney at the California Innocence Project (CIP). As part of his work with CIP, he has been involved in many cases involving the exoneration of previously convicted prisoners, working closely with the organization's director, Justin Brooks, and also preparing petitions for many of CIP's clients. After working at CIP while still a law student at California Western School of Law, following graduation in 2010 he became an investigator and then a staff attorney there.

He was involved in the high-profile case of star linebacker Brian Banks, and was instrumental in Banks' exoneration in 2012 from a wrongful 2002 conviction as a sex offender, which had destroyed Banks' promising career as a high-school athlete. As a result of his work on this case, the (now defunct) California Lawyer Magazine named Semanchik Attorney of the Year in 2013.

In the Spring of 2013, Semanchik and two other CIP attorneys walked over 700 miles from San Diego to Sacramento in an event called The Innocence March, a public protest against the incarceration of twelve California inmates they considered innocent, which also served to bring awareness to the problem of wrongly convicted prisoners. They also presented twelve petitions to California Governor Jerry Brown, demanding clemency for the twelve.

Semanchik has spoken at a number of conferences relating to investigations and his work with the California Innocence Project. He has appeared in the media relating to this work over three dozen times. He has also authored essays relating to the criminal justice system, advocating for reform. In 2014, the San Diego Daily Transcript recognized Semanchik in its list of "Top Attorneys."

== Legal training ==
In 2008, while still attending CWSL, he joined CIP as a clinic student, through which he investigated claims of innocence under staff supervision. Following his year as a clinic student, Semanchik assisted director Justin Brooks in drafting the first Wrongful Conviction Casebook. In 2010, Semanchik graduated cum laude from California Western School of Law.

== Innocence work ==
=== Responsibilities ===
As Managing Attorney of the California Innocence Project, Semanchik's responsibilities included drafting, filing and litigating habeas petitions and motions for DNA testing in California State courts. He also supervised and oversaw law students in the clinical program. He has interviewed and hired as many as 60 interns a year. He also managed CIP's social media presence and website, and produces film and videos for promotional materials. He coordinated with news agencies around the world to maximize CIP's media exposure. He located, around the U.S., witnesses for cases, and interviews potential clients in prisons all over California.

=== Prominent cases ===
==== Brian Banks ====
The 2002 conviction of All Star linebacker Brian Banks on false charges of rape and kidnapping was dismissed in 2012, directly due to the efforts of the California Innocence Project. Following his initial arrest for the alleged crimes, Banks, despite his protestations of innocence, faced a possible conviction, if the case had gone to trial, of 41-years-to-life, and reluctantly agreed to a plea bargain. He was then given an unexpectedly harsh sentence of six years in prison (of which he served five years and two months), followed by five years' probation and registration as a sex offender.

After his release on probation, he arranged for a meeting with his accuser, Wanetta Gibson (who had contacted him through Facebook), at which she admitted on video that there had been no rape or kidnapping in 2002, and that their encounter had been completely consensual. The video evidence was not admissible in court, because the video had been made without Gibson's knowledge or consent and was not accompanied by a signed confession from the young woman. However, Semanchik was instrumental in putting together additional evidence supporting Banks' story, which led the district attorney to dismiss all charges against him and release him from sex-offender status, allowing him to resume his aborted sports career.

Banks supports CIP in its efforts on behalf of the wrongly-convicted, including participating in CIP's 2013 Innocence March (see below). He often wears a shirt with the lettering "XONR8" ("exonerate"). Semanchik, as a result of his work on this case, was named by California Lawyer Magazine as Attorney of the Year in 2013.

==== Guy Miles ====
Semanchik helped defend Guy Miles, who was wrongly convicted of robbery. Semanchik explained in a television interview why the eyewitness identifications in this case were unreliable, and why standards regarding such testimony must be strengthened. "The detective [in the case] took six-pack lineups… and he put more than one suspect in the six-pack, which is an absolute no-no… he also put various sizes of people in the same six-pack, various hair styles… the five fillers [non-suspects] are supposed to look somewhat similar to what the suspect looks like," but in this case, they did not.

However, despite the fact that Miles had numerous witnesses to provide an alibi for his whereabouts at the time of the crime, and the fact that the two men indisputably guilty of the robbery confessed that Miles had had absolutely nothing to do with the crime, the judge in the case refused to exonerate Miles, maintaining that the eyewitness identifications were strong and rejecting the argument of California Innocence Project attorneys that they were not. Miles was finally freed in June 2017 after 18 years in prison, following a second hearing that reversed his earlier conviction.

==== Kimberly Long ====
Kim Long was convicted of murdering her boyfriend in 2003, and her case was received by the California Innocence Project in 2009. After many years of extensive investigation, research and forensic testing, the CIP became certain of Kim's innocence. The case was assigned to CIP attorney Alissa Bjerkhoel. The prosecution's case hinged on the testimony of a single witness, a friend of Long's, who had claimed that, on the night of the murder, he had dropped Long off at the apartment that she and the victim shared, at a time which the prosecution claimed would have allowed Long a window of opportunity sufficient to have committed the crime – and concealed her involvement – before calling 911 to report the death. (Since the witness himself had died in an unrelated accident shortly after providing his testimony, he could not be cross-examined.)

However, the CIP provided forensic proof that the victim had been killed prior to the witness' alleged drop-off time for Long (that is, before the earliest possible time of her return to the apartment), and that, even if the victim had actually been killed after that point in time, Long would not have had enough time to murder her boyfriend and hide evidence of that fact from police. DNA from an unknown male was also recovered at the crime scene. The evidence of her innocence was so compelling that the very same judge who heard the original case reversed the conviction in June 2016.

==== William Richards ====
William Richards was convicted in 1993 for murdering his wife Pamela and served 23 years in prison. Part of the reason he was convicted of the murder was because an expert testified that an apparent bite mark on the victim's body was made by Richards. The expert later recanted his testimony. In addition, testing revealed that the DNA on the murder weapons and the hairs under the victim's fingernails belonged to neither Richards nor the victim.

When he was released, Richards, 67, was broke, homeless, without a job and suffering from prostate cancer. Wendy Koen, a student who had worked on Bill's case and subsequently became a lawyer, offered to give Bill a place to stay upon his release. Semanchik and CIP have since tried to obtain compensation from the state for the decades he spent wrongly incarcerated.

==== Reggie Cole ====
In 1994, Reggie Cole was convicted of the shooting of Felipe Angeles after being misidentified by an eyewitness, a local brothel owner. The police allege that the killer was shot in the leg upon leaving the scene and, after finding a gunshot wound in Cole's leg, concluded that he was the perpetrator. However, despite the fact that medical records were produced that proved Cole had actually received his leg wound six years prior, he was convicted.

In 2010, due to the efforts of the California Innocence Project, Cole's conviction was thrown out due to ineffective assistance of counsel, and five years later he was found "factually innocent." Semanchik appeared in the 2018 documentary, Survivors Guide to Prison, in relation to his work on the Reggie Cole case.

==== Michael Hanline ====
In November 1978, the body of truck driver J.T. McGarry, who had been shot multiple times, was found over 25 miles from his Ventura County home. Michael Hanline was suspected of having murdered him, with the help of an accomplice, because he and McGarry had both been involved with the same woman. Largely on this woman's testimony, Hanline was sentenced to life without parole in 1980. CIP eventually discovered that a since-deceased attorney named Bruce Robertson had attempted to implicate Hanline in order to direct suspicion away from his own clients, and had intimidated potential witnesses. A witness had even placed Robertson at McGarry's home on the night of his murder. In addition, DNA testing pointed to Hanline's innocence, and it was established that the woman who testified against him had been on drugs, both on the night of the murder and at the time of her testimony.

On November 24, 2014, Hanline was released from Ventura County Court a free man, and in April of the following year, a judge dismissed all charges against him, as the district attorney had decided not to retry the case. Having served 36 years behind bars, Hanline was the longest-incarcerated person whose conviction was reversed in the history of the State of California until Craig Coley was exonerated in 2017.

==== Scott McMahon ====
Scott McMahon is a United States citizen who was wrongfully imprisoned in the Philippines from April, 2011 to August, 2016. Dolores San Pablo Vermeulen, the wife of an acquaintance, had previously called in the police to raid McMahon's home in search of her husband, an action that had an extremely traumatic effect on McMahon's son. McMahon then brought a lawsuit against Vermeulen for child abuse. Vermeulen in turn accused McMahon of having raped her in February 2010, though she had brought no charges until six months after the alleged rape. A medical examination of Vermeulen showed no sign of rape, and McMahon could prove that he was on vacation hundreds of miles away with his family at the time of the alleged assault. Despite lack of evidence of any crime, McMahon was arrested.

The California Innocence Project partnered with the David House Agency to represent McMahon, who was held in prison without bail in conditions described as "filthy and overcrowded with an overpowering stench." Semanchik, who attended some of McMahon's bail hearings, commented, "If the authorities in the Philippines would have done even a shred of an investigation, they would've quickly realized that Scott couldn't have done this." Finally, on August 2, 2016, a Filipino judge acquitted McMahon of all charges. However, McMahon could not leave the country, because the Filipino Bureau of Immigration demanded that he pay them $1000 for every year since his visa expired, despite the fact that the only reason he let it expire was because he had been imprisoned for a crime he didn't commit. Due to heavy U.S. government pressure, McMahon was allowed to return home to Seattle on September 4, 2016.

==== Horace Roberts ====
Horace Roberts, a supervisor at a diagnostic lab, was convicted, after three trials, of second-degree murder in the 1998 strangulation death of Terry Cheek, a co-worker with whom the married Roberts had been having an affair. The victim herself had been married to Googie Harris, Sr., who knew about the affair, had filed a restraining order against Cheek and had demanded custody of their daughters. The evidence that had swayed the jury at the third trial was the presence, about a mile from the murder scene, of Roberts’ truck (which Cheek had frequently borrowed), the fact that he had initially lied about the affair with Cheek to police and, above all, the presence near the body of a watch that Roberts had mistakenly identified as his. (Roberts’ watch was later found at his home.) Harris, the victim's husband, testified against Roberts at each of his three trials and later opposed Robert's release from prison at his parole hearings.

"In this case," said Semanchik, "what stood out was it didn't make sense why somebody that would have committed the crime would have then just left their perfectly operable truck at the scene. Why not get in your truck and drive away?" Roberts also had an alibi: on the day of the murder, he had placed multiple calls to Cheek from a pay phone near his home. The CIP decided that the evidence that convicted Roberts was circumstantial and decided to take on the case.

In 2016, a request by the CIP for new DNA testing, more sophisticated than what was done in 1998, was granted. DNA from the victim's left-hand fingernails and clothes matched to Harris’ nephew, Joaquin Leal, who had served prison time on a molestation case against the child of a woman with whom Harris was then having a relationship. Meanwhile, the CIP lobbied the legislature, in line with other states, to reduce the legal evidentiary standard, which would make the original 2014 DNA evidence to the judge sufficient to exonerate Roberts. The legislature passed this reform in September 2016. All this evidence was brought to the attention of Riverside District Attorney Mike Hestrin's Conviction Review Committee. Because of the DNA match, Leal and Harris then became the focus of a new probe. On October 2, 2018, the office agreed to reverse Roberts’ conviction. Ten days later, all charges against Roberts were dismissed, and on October 15, the D.A.’s office agreed to a Finding of Factual Innocence in Roberts’ case. On the same day, it filed charges in the murder of Terry Cheek against Harris and Leal.

"We've never seen anything like this," said Semanchik. "We've never had a case where the prosecution has gone and made arrests [i.e., of Harris and Leal] after the fact, after we've proven our person innocent. So this is a very unique case." Under the law, wrongfully convicted inmates such as Roberts are entitled to receive $140 for each day incarcerated, which would add up to over $1 million for his nearly 20 years in prison.

=== The Innocence March ===
From April to June 2013, Semanchik, CIP director Justin Brooks and attorney Alissa Bjerkhoel, along with many Canlifornia Innocence Project exonerees and supporters, participated in an event they called The Innocence March. Determined to gain clemency from Governor Jerry Brown for twelve convicted prisoners whom they deemed to be "100 percent innocent" (including Guy Miles, Kim Long, William Richards and Michael Hanline, who were, at the time, still incarcerated), as well as to gain public awareness of the plight of wrongfully convicted prisoners, they walked a 700-mile route from the CIP's offices in San Diego to the Capitol at Sacramento to formally present their petition on behalf of the twelve to the governor.

Semanchik said at the time, in a television interview, "I think it's important to have this walk because we need to raise awareness about wrongful convictions. I think there's a lot of people out there that … think the criminal justice system is doing its job and doing a great job, and that's just not the case. And so in addition to trying to secure the release of these twelve people, we're also trying to get the word out that criminal justice could use some reform." The trio of lawyers trained extensively for weeks prior to this march. The marchers usually began each day's trek at about 5:30 am and covered about 20 miles by the end of each day, often in inclement weather and sometimes walking along railroad tracks and even through forests.

Guy Miles' 80-year-old uncle marched twelve miles of the route with the group despite a leg injury. Semanchik said, "To see the kind of support that his family still has for him, that makes you want to walk 10,000 miles – whatever it takes." The team of attorneys met Miles himself at San Quentin prison during their journey. Adam Riojas, a CIP client freed after 14 years in prison, accompanied the marchers from San Diego to Oceanside, where he is now the pastor of a local chapel. Brian Banks joined the march at Malibu to lend his support so that other wrongfully-convicted prisoners could be released.

The march reached its destination in fifty-one days, four days earlier than the original 55-day schedule. In December of the same year, the California Innocence Project recreated the final (Sacramento) leg of the original march, from Raley Field to the governor's office at the Capitol. Although Gov. Brown did not grant clemency to any of the twelve, the march resulted in extensive press coverage. The Innocence March was selected by San Diego Magazine as one of the "27 Reasons to Love SD [San Diego] Now." Five of the twelve prisoners named in the petition (including Miles, Long, Richards and Hanline) have subsequently been freed through CIP's efforts.

== Legal positions and personal views ==
Semanchik has often given print and broadcast interviews to make the case for criminal justice reform. For example, in a television interview, he criticized an existing law which states that a person accused of a crime must assert his or her innocence immediately, and cannot be exonerated if he or she does so only later on. Semanchik indicated that he has provided facts to lawmakers to encourage them to repeal this "timeliness" rule.

One of his ongoing causes is to obtain adequate compensation for long-term prisoners who have since been found legally innocent and freed from prison. Responding to a question about the case of William Richards (see above), a man who spent 23 years behind bars for a murder he didn't commit, Semanchik spoke on behalf of him and all his freed clients when he said, "The compensation process has been nothing but a nightmare for us and for our clients."

In a 2015 radio interview relating to the use by police of familial DNA to track down and identify a sexual predator of young children in California, Semanchik suggested that there were serious potential privacy issues in using familial DNA in law enforcement. While conceding that the outcome of the particular case described was a positive one (that is, the predator was apprehended), Semanchik said, "We have to do a balancing act, where we have to say, 'keep law enforcement in check, do not allow them to get further down the road and expand upon their use of this.' And that's always going to be an issue, any time you have any kind of technology and ability for law enforcement to pry into… individuals' lives."

In an article about flaws in the science of DNA testing, an incident was described in which CIP asked a large private lab to test evidence that they believed could exonerate a man convicted of murder. After that lab reported that the DNA test was inconclusive, they took the same data to another analyst, who said that the DNA evidence proved the convict was innocent. Semanchik claimed that he had no hesitation about asking more than one analyst to examine the same data, but was troubled by the implications. "How can two labs get entirely different answers from the same DNA tests?" he was quoted as saying.

The CIP has supported efforts to modify or repeal California's so-called Three Strikes Law. In 2012, California referendum Proposition (Prop) 36 – which modified the law so that minor felony crimes (such as drug possession) wouldn't count as the third "strike" if a two-time felon gets convicted for the third time – passed by an overwhelming majority of voters. CIP accepted the case under the Institute for Criminal Defense Advocacy (ICDA), an organization that helped found CIP. In November 2012, Kenneth Corley, became the first person, after he petitioned the court, to be released under the new law, after 16 years in prison. Semanchik said, "It just didn't make sense for him to be serving any more time… I was really confident that Kenny was going to make it [after being released from prison]." His confidence stemmed in part from Corley's exemplary record as a prisoner.

Semanchik supported the 2015 decision of the Los Angeles District Attorney's office to set up a team of veteran prosecutors to review the cases of incarcerated persons who present new evidence that they were wrongfully convicted. "The DA has a duty to re-examine these cases," Semanchik said. "We always hoped they would. Hopefully, this will give [the California Innocence Project] a greater opportunity to make our cases to them."

Semanchik has stated in a video interview that one of his toughest personal challenges as a member of the California Innocence Project occurs when, following a review of the case of a person he believes was wrongfully convicted, he is forced to close that case because he knows that the evidence of innocence would not be considered sufficient by a judge to reverse the incarcerated person's conviction.

== Honors, presentations and publications ==
Semanchik was one of 60 lawyers honored by California Lawyer magazine as one of its 2013 Attorneys of the Year. In 2014, he was chosen as one of San Diego's Top Attorneys, Criminal Division, by the San Diego Daily Transcript.

He has made public presentations about the wrongfully convicted and the Innocence March at, among many other venues, the USC School of Social Work, the SDSU School of Public Affairs, the UCSD Community Law Project, Point Loma Nazarene University, the Greater Inland Empire Municipal Law Association and the Defense Investigators Association Conference.

In an opinion piece published on the California Innocence Project website (representing his own views, rather than those of the organization), Semanchik argued strongly for prison reform, beginning with correcting America's "insane sentencing laws," and establishing "adequate (and relevant) job training, actual jobs upon release, and reentry programs to help inmates stay out."

In another opinion piece on the CIP website, he noted that, though politicians often claim to be "tough on crime," he believed that the criminal justice system would be improved if politicians and officials were "smart on crime" instead, because of the increasing costs of incarceration and the fact that "we don't have unlimited resources." In the article, he mentioned 16 CIP clients whom he believes are factually innocent, including some who remained incarcerated despite having their convictions overturned by a judge. "If these inmates were to be released, it would save the state $720,000, annually," Semanchik claimed.

In a 2015 article in Riverside Lawyer magazine, Semanchik maintained that the legal evidentiary standard in California to reverse convictions was too high. He argued that that standard should be brought into line with those in other states, which have ruled that it is only necessary to prove that new evidence would probably have resulted in a different verdict if introduced at time of trial.

== Personal life ==
Semanchik is a Pittsburgh native. In his youth, Mike achieved the rank of Eagle Scout with the Boy Scouts of America. After graduating from North Allegheny High School in 2003, he received a Bachelor of Science in Business Administration (BSBA) degree from the A.J. Palumbo School of Business at Duquesne University in 2007, with a focus on economics and finance.

He currently lives in San Diego with his wife, Nikki Semanchik, and two children.
