= Brian Banks =

Brian Banks may refer to:

- Brian Banks (American football) (born 1985), American football player who was falsely accused of rape
  - Brian Banks (film), an American biographical drama film
- Brian Banks (baseball) (born 1970), American baseball player
- Brian Banks (politician) (born 1976), former member of the Michigan House of Representatives
- Brian Banks, musician with The Beepers
