= Death of Gloria Huang =

Matthew and Grace Huang are an American couple who were convicted by the judicial system of Qatar in March 2014 of neglecting their daughter (whom they had adopted), thus leading to her death. However, on November 30, 2014, the Appellate Court of Qatar declared the Huangs innocent, and three days later lifted the travel ban allowing them to return home and be reunited with their sons.

== Background ==
The Huangs moved to Qatar with their three young children in 2012. Matthew Huang, a Stanford-trained engineer, was relocated there by his employer, MWH Global, to work for two years on a major infrastructure project related to the 2022 World Cup improvements. Matthew and Grace had adopted all three of their children from Africa. The Huangs’ middle child was Gloria, whom they adopted from an orphanage in Ghana when she was 4 years old in 2009 and who had chronic eating disorders according to the parents.

== Gloria Huang ==
In Ghana, Gloria was born into poverty and grew up in impoverished conditions during her time in an orphanage. "The Huangs describe her eating issues as a sporadic behavioral problem that resulted in Gloria sometimes going days where she refused to eat. She would then follow such fasting with unhealthy binge eating and attempts to find food from bizarre sources, such as in the trash or from neighbors. The Huangs were aware of their daughter’s eating issues, had educated themselves about the best way to handle those issues, and were attempting to manage the situation and help her grow out of it." Matthew and Grace Huang say that Gloria had eating disorders. The California Innocence Project has said that Gloria died of her eating disorder.

On January 15, 2013, Gloria died unexpectedly and suddenly. The death certificate, issued by Qatar's supreme council of health, listed the causes of death as "cachexia and dehydration". Her parents were subsequently arrested on suspicion of murder and human trafficking.

== Matthew and Grace Huang ==
Prior to moving to Doha, Qatar, Matthew and Grace Huang lived in San Gabriel, California. The Huangs have three adopted African children. During the Huangs detainment, their other two children were being cared for by their grandmother.

Matthew is a licensed civil engineer in California and graduated from the University of California, Irvine in 1998, Stanford University with a master's degree in 1999 and has worked for MWH Global since July 1999. In 2012, Matthew moved to Doha with his wife, Grace, and their three children (all of whom were adopted), because MWH Global relocated him there to work for two years on a major infrastructure project related to the 2022 FIFA World Cup. During this time, Grace Huang homeschooled the three children in Qatar.

In October 2013, the Huangs two other children left Qatar to live with family back in the United States. Prior to this, their grandmother had flown to Qatar to care for them while Matthew and Grace were in custody. This came as a result of a private negotiations between the Huang's representatives and the Qatar Attorney General Ali bin Fetais al-Marri.

Matthew and Grace Huang were released from custody on November 6, 2013, but still faced charges.

== Detainment ==
Matthew and Grace Huang were detained by Qatar police on January 15, 2013. They were released from custody on November 6, 2013. If convicted, they could face the death sentence, although Qatar has maintained a moratorium on actual executions for more than a decade.

== Case ==
=== Police investigation ===
According to the "California Innocence Project" the report filed by the police in the investigation noted that the children were not “good-looking” and did not share the “hereditary traits” of their parents. The CIP reported that investigations also theorize that Matthew and Grace “bought” their children in order to harvest their organs, or perhaps to perform medical experiments on them, allegations arising from the testimony of unnamed sources who claimed that family kept to themselves and did not socialize

However, friends of the family in Qatar came forward to praise Matthew and Grace's parenting skills and the way they care for and love their children. One family was even at the Huang's home the night before Gloria's death, where they say that they witnessed Gloria walking around and sitting with the family.

=== Forensic evidence ===
While the death certificate indicated that the causes of death as "cachexia and dehydration," an independent review performed by a US pediatric forensic pathologist questioned the determination. The formal definition of cachexia is the loss of body mass that cannot be reversed nutritionally. Cachexia can produce symptoms such as weight loss and muscle atrophy, which often looks similar to starvation, and can be caused by a range of conditions, including congestive heart failure and autoimmune diseases. These causes were not screened in the report by the medical examiner in Doha.

One theory of Gloria's death was that she was starved. Eyewitness accounts claim that the last time Gloria was seen eating was four days prior to her death. However, Gloria was witnessed walking around her home the day before she died by a visiting family. Her brothers recounted to the police how they had played with her and that she had appeared normal in the days before she died.

According to the report by the Qatari medical examiner, Dr. Anis Mahmoud Khalifa, Gloria also lacked other physical hallmarks of a child who was starved to death or abused.

There were also several other considerations regarding Gloria's medical history that were not addressed by the medical examiner. Gloria suffered from giardia when she was adopted, an infection which is difficult to eliminate. She also had recent blood tests showing severely low levels of a certain type of leukocytes that may have been a sign of an underlying bone marrow condition. In addition, Gloria had a vitamin D deficiency.

The medical examiner's report also made no mention of testing the vitreous humour, the clear gel inside the eyes, which is a standard way to diagnose dehydration. Gloria's bodily fluids were tested only for drugs, poison and semen, and all tests were negative.

=== Trial ===
In the court hearing of June 18, 2013, several witnesses testified for the prosecution. A police detective from the criminal investigation department said that according to information gathered from “intelligence sources we knew that the defendant once has taken away a candy off the girl’s hand, and grounded her for eating it.”

Pertaining to the issue of adoption, detective Ahmad Issac Hamoudah Abu Zoro told the court, “As you are aware, the deceased child has black complexion, very skinny while her parents are white. Parents who wish to adopt children should be selective so that their kids are supposed to be beautiful.” Adoption outside of biological families does not occur in Qatar or in other Gulf Arab societies.

The California Innocence Project claims that Qatari police records stated that it was odd that the Asian Huangs had adopted black children who were not “good looking” and who didn't share their “hereditary traits.”

In addition, Dr. Anis Mahmoud Khalifa, the medical examiner who conducted Gloria's autopsy, openly told the court, “I never mentioned in my report or statements the word “starvation” but rather emaciation,” contradicting the prosecution's basis for charging her parents with starving Gloria to death.

The request to drop the charges against the American couple were rejected and bail was declined.

On Tuesday, October 1, 2013, Judge Abdullah Al-Emady ordered the Huangs to remain imprisoned until at least their next hearing, which was scheduled for November 6, 2013. Officials raised questions about the Huangs paying adoption fees to an adoption agency. After Tuesday's hearing, Matthew proclaimed his innocence.

On March 27, 2014, Matthew and Grace were each sentenced to three years in prison and fined 15,000 Qatari Riyals. No verdict was read by the judge. The couple was not detained, pending the appeals process, but remained restricted from leaving the country. The travel ban went against the precedent set in the Villagio Mall fire, where 5 Qataris were sentenced to 6 years in prison after being convicted of murder by negligence, but were allowed to travel without restriction during appeals. The U.S. State Department issued a statement following the judicial announcement, noting that they were "surprised and disappointed" by the result.

Several weeks later, the defendants were notified that they had been found guilty of child endangerment, a different crime from that which they had been originally charged and tried.

=== Court of Appeals ===
Following two procedural hearings in which the appeals of the defense and prosecution were both heard and accepted, the charges were merged into a single appeals trial on June 16, 2014. In that hearing, the defense argued for the closure of the appeals for judgment and presented closing arguments and written arguments. The prosecution requested for the forensic pathologist that did the original autopsy to testify again before the appellate court. The judges deliberated and accepted the prosecutor's motion, and set the next trial date for October 20, 2014.

During this time, the U.S. State Department issued its first public statement of support for the Huangs:

"On July 30, 2014, Under Secretary for Political Affairs Wendy Sherman and Assistant Secretary for Near Eastern Affairs Anne Patterson met with family and representatives of U.S. citizens Matthew and Grace Huang concerning their ongoing legal proceedings in Qatar following the tragic death of their daughter, Gloria.

Under Secretary Sherman conveyed concern for the Huang family’s well-being, adding that assisting U.S. citizens in need overseas was among the Department’s highest priorities.

Senior U.S. Government officials have raised the Huangs’ case with the Government of Qatar on multiple occasions, and the State Department will continue to engage Qatari officials at the highest levels. We seek the Qatari Government’s assistance in providing a fair and expeditious conclusion to the proceedings. We also urge the Qatari Government to lift the current travel ban and allow Mr. and Mrs. Huang to return home to the United States to be reunited with their two sons and the rest of their family."

The State Department then issued a follow-up statement on October 6, 2014:

"The U.S. Government continues to closely follow the legal proceedings in Qatar of American citizens Matthew and Grace Huang, whose appeals hearing is set for October 20. Mr. and Mrs. Huang have been detained in Qatar since the tragic death of their daughter in January 2013.

The U.S. Government strongly urges that the Qatari Government immediately lift the travel ban and allow Mr. and Mrs. Huang to return to the United States on a humanitarian basis to be reunited with their children and family, pending the completion of legal proceedings. We continue to call on the Qatari Government to bring the case to an expeditious and just conclusion."

On October 20, 2014, the first appeals hearings for the Huang case began. In court, the prosecutor reexamined the forensic pathologist, who read his testimony from a document on his podium. The witness contradicted his previous testimony by stating that there was no food or water in Gloria's intestines, and that it was not his job to determine whether she had died of starvation. As the Huang's attorney began his cross-examination of the witness, he was stopped by the judge, and not allowed to complete his cross-examination. During the prosecutor's final arguments in which he argued that the children had been purchased and that they had murdered their daughter, Matthew shouted out "You lie! You lie!" at the prosecutor, which shocked the courtroom. The judges then closed the argument portion of the appeals trial and set the verdict hearing for November 30, 2014.

=== Employer pressure to return to work ===
After Matthew Huang was released from custody, a dispute arose between Huang and his American employer, MWH Global, which requested — now that he was out of prison — that Matthew return to work or forfeit further pay and benefits. In what the employer called a personnel issue and Matthew Huang called an unrealistic demand that amounted to forced dismissal, he resigned.

=== Representation ===
Due to the medical evidence of Matthew and Grace Huang's innocence, they became pro bono clients of the California Innocence Project (part of the Innocence Project based at the California Western School of Law in San Diego). The Huangs were also represented by Lewis and Roca.

The Huang case was managed by the Los Angeles-based David House Agency, an international crisis resource agency that has handled other notable cases such as the case of American Hikers in Iran, Amanda Knox, and Jason Puracal.

=== Exoneration ===
On November 30, 2014, the Appellate Court of Qatar declared the Huangs innocent, and three days later lifted the travel ban allowing them to return home and be reunited with their sons.

== See also ==
- 2022 FIFA World Cup
- Children's rights
- Human rights in Qatar
- Interracial adoption
- International adoption
- Villagio Mall
