= Afghan Organization of Human Rights and Environmental Protection =

Afghanistani human rights organization

The Afghan Organization of Human Rights and Environmental Protection (AOHREP) is a human rights organization that operated in Afghanistan.

== History ==
=== Background ===
Before the formation, nine human rights organizations were present in Afghanistan, which were mostly international. These organizations are Amnesty International, Front Line Defenders, Freedom House, Freedom Now, and five other organizations. Even with the presence of the organizations, human rights in Afghanistan kept worsening. Mostly because of the Taliban. A report made by the United Nations Interim Administration Mission in Afghanistan stated that 160 fatalities and 56 instances of torture were present. For the formation of the organization, multiple charities were pled for donations to create the organization.

=== Formation ===
Later, the nine organizations formed the Afghan Organization of Human Rights and Environmental Protection, with the member organizations engaging with the United Nations.

=== Aftermath ===
Just after the formation, Abdul Hotaky was elected as an Independent Electoral Commission appointee.

== Members ==
- Head - Abdul Hotaky
