= Brian Banks (film) =

2018 American biographical film

- Theatrical release poster
- Directed by: Tom Shadyac
- Written by: Doug Atchison
- Produced by: Amy Baer; Monica Levinson; Shivani Rawat
- Starring: Aldis Hodge; Greg Kinnear; Sherri Shepherd; Melanie Liburd
- Cinematography: Ricardo Diaz
- Edited by: Greg Hayden
- Music by: John Debney
- Production companies: ShivHans Pictures; Gidden Media
- Distributed by: Bleecker Street
- Release dates: September 22, 2018 (LAFF); August 9, 2019 (United States)
- Running time: 99 minutes
- Country: United States
- Language: English
- Budget: $10 million
- Box office: $4.4 million

Brian Banks is a 2018 American biographical drama film directed by Tom Shadyac and written by Doug Atchison. It is based on the true story of Brian Banks, a high school football linebacker who was falsely accused of rape, convicted, sent to prison and, upon his release, attempted to fulfill his dream of making the National Football League. The film stars Aldis Hodge, Greg Kinnear, Sherri Shepherd, and Melanie Liburd. Brian Banks premiered at the LA Film Festival on September 22, 2018, and was released in the United States by Bleecker Street on August 9, 2019.

== Plot ==
Brian Banks is a 27-year-old former high school football star living with his mother in Long Beach, California. Banks is currently on parole and registered as a sex offender due to an incident 11 years prior where he and a classmate, Kennisha, sneaked off to kiss. When Banks overheard teachers approaching, he fled to avoid getting caught, leading the scorned Kennisha to falsely accuse him of raping her.

On the advice of his attorney, Banks pled no contest to rape and was sentenced to six years in prison. His childhood dreams of becoming an NFL player are further damaged when new laws require him to wear an ankle monitor at all times as well as staying 2,000 feet away from schools and public gathering spots, preventing him from playing football. He also has trouble finding legitimate employment due to his criminal record.

Banks approaches the California Innocence Project hoping to clear his name, and they advise him to write a plea of habeas corpus to the California legal system to get them to do a retrial. When this fails, Innocence Project founder Justin Brooks explains that the justice system requires new evidence that incontrovertibly points to Banks' innocence before they will hear his pleas; this excludes DNA evidence, which was taken during the original trial but never used in Banks' defense.

Innocence Project lawyers interview several of Banks' former classmates, but their word is not strong enough to cast doubt on Banks' conviction. Meanwhile, Banks unexpectedly receives a Facebook friend request from Kennisha, leading him to devise a scheme with several of his friends to trick her into confessing on tape that the rape allegation was fraudulent.

This seemingly succeeds, and Banks takes the tape to the Innocence Project. However, since Kennisha did not know she was being recorded, the evidence is inadmissible in a California court. Brooks sends the tape to the media, causing public outcry at the injustice of Banks' situation. Banks' parole officer calls and warns him that his contact with Kennisha is a parole violation, but gives him until his parole expires before reporting the violation and placing Banks back in prison.

Brooks approaches Mateo, the district attorney, and convinces him that Banks needs a new trial. Banks goes to court, but Kennisha refuses to testify and claims that Banks offered her $20,000 to say he didn't rape her on tape. Mateo and Brooks confront Kennisha and eventually get her to say on the record that Banks bribing her was a lie; this casts enough doubt on Banks' guilt to convince the judge to finally overturn Banks' conviction.

Banks cuts off the ankle bracelet and heads to a local park, where he enjoys a game of football with some local children. The final narration reveals that Pete Carroll, a former University of Southern California coach who offered him a scholarship to USC during his high school days, invited him to try out for the Seattle Seahawks; failing to make the team due to his skills atrophying as a result of his extended time in prison, Banks trained hard over the next year and eventually was signed by the Atlanta Falcons.

== Cast ==
- Aldis Hodge as Brian Banks
- Greg Kinnear as Justin Brooks
- Melanie Liburd as Karina Cooper
- Xosha Roquemore as Kennisha Rice (inspired by Wanetta Gibson)
- Tiffany Dupont as Alissa Bjerkhoel
- Sherri Shepherd as Leomia
- Jose Miguel Vasquez as District Attorney Mateo
- Morgan Freeman as Jerome Johnson
- Dorian Missick as Officer Mick Randolph

== Release ==
The film was theatrically released in the United States on August 9, 2019, to low box office results.

=== Box office ===
In the United States and Canada, Brian Banks was released alongside The Kitchen, Dora and the Lost City of Gold, Scary Stories to Tell in the Dark and The Art of Racing in the Rain, and was projected to gross around $2.5 million from 1,327 theaters in its opening weekend. It ended up debuting to $2.1 million. At the end of the film's theatrical release the film was ultimately a box office failure that grossed $4.3 million against a $10 million budget.

=== Critical response ===
On review aggregator website Rotten Tomatoes, the film holds an approval rating of 63% based on 72 reviews, and an average rating of 6/10. The site's critical consensus reads: "While it remains a reasonably inspiring drama, Brian Banks might have presented a more complex or fully realized version of the real-life story it dramatizes." Metacritic gave the film a weighted average score of 58 out of 100, based on 17 critics, indicating "mixed or average" reviews. Audiences polled by PostTrak gave the film an average 4.5 out of 5 stars, while 72% said they would definitely recommend it to a friend.

Reviewing the film in The New York Times, Jeannette Catsoulis praised Hodge's performance, and the movie as a whole: it "isn't a great movie, but it is a worthwhile one". However, she criticised the minor characters as being "underwritten" and the screenplay as being "formulaic" and "heavyhanded", and the film overall as being "sometimes disappointingly bland". Alan Zilberman gave the film three out of five stars in his review for The Washington Post, praising Hodge's performance and Shadyac's directing.

== Accolades ==
Brian Banks won the Audience Award for Fiction Feature Film at the 2018 Los Angeles Film Festival.
