= Phan Kim Khánh =

Vietnamese student and blogger

Phan Kim Khanh
- Born: 1993 (age 32–33); Phú Thọ
- Occupations: Student and Blogger
- Known for: Citizen journalism

Phan Kim Khánh (born 1993) is a Vietnamese student and blogger from Phú Thọ province, Vietnam. He was arrested and charged with “conducting propaganda against the state,” under Article 88 of the Vietnamese Penal Code. He was sentenced to six years of prison followed by four years of house arrest.

== Background ==
In 2017, Phan Kim Khánh was a student at the Department of International Relations at Thai Nguyen University. Khánh founded a student club to facilitate volunteer work and was also active in the university's student association. He also worked as the head of the marketing department for the a software company OtVina Software Co. Additionally, Khánh wrote blog posts and ran YouTube channels that covered topics including politics and corruption.

== 2014 arrest and sentence ==
Khánh was arrested March 21, 2017, for founding and running two blogs in 2015 called “Newspaper of [anti]Corruption” (Bao Tham Nhung) and “Vietnam Weekly” (Tuan Viet Nam). The authorities found that he had helped to administer several social media accounts and pages that constituted “propaganda against the Socialist Republic of Viet Nam,”.

Khánh was held incommunicado for most of his pretrial detention, which lasted seven months. On October 25, 2017, Khánh was tried in the People's Court of Thái Nguyên Province. After a four-hour hearing, he was convicted of the conducting propaganda against the Government, under article 88 of the Penal Code. He was sentenced to six years of prison followed by four years of house arrest.

Phan Kim Khánh was placed in solitary confinement for "rebelling against prison authorities” in January 2020.

== International response ==
In October 2017, Human Rights Watch called on Vietnam to drop all charges against Phan Kim Khánh. Asia Director Brady Adams stated "The only crime Phan Kim Khánh committed was to express political views disapproved by the authorities. Students should be encouraged to write about social and political problems—not punished. International donors and trade partners need to step up pressure on the country’s leaders to improve its abysmal rights record, and the APEC Summit is a good moment to start,”.

In October 2017, James Tager, Senior Manager of Free Expression Programs at PEN America, stated "Blogging is not a crime, despite Vietnam’s repeated efforts to treat it as one. Phan Kim Khánh should be released immediately, and the Vietnamese government should recognize that Article 88 is completely inconsistent with international guarantees regarding the right to free expression,”.

In March 2019, human rights focused non-profit Freedom Now submitted a report detailing the case to the Office of the United Nations Human Rights Committee. This report was delivered in advance of Vietnam's Universal Periodic Review conducted by the UN in January 2019.

In September 2019, Freedom Now and international law firm Dechert LLP submitted a petition to the UN Working Group on Arbitrary Detention on behalf of Phan Kim Khánh. In May 2020, the Working Group determined that his detention is arbitrary and violates international law.

In late 2020, Vietnam's Ministry of Public Security, which oversees the country's prison system, did not respond to the Committee to Protect Journalists' emailed requests for comment about Khánh's health, status in prison, and allegations of mistreatment.

== See also ==
- Human rights in Vietnam
