= Jason Puracal =

American wrongfully suspected of drug trafficking

Jason Puracal (born May 31, 1977) is an American who was wrongly sentenced to serve 22 years in prison in Nicaragua on charges of drug trafficking, money laundering, and organized crime. Puracal's case went before the Appeals Court on August 16, 2012, nearly one year after his original conviction. On September 12, 2012, he was acquitted of all charges by the Appeals Court.

Many experts came forward supporting Puracal's innocence including the California Innocence Project, former DEA agent Thomas Cash, former Minister of Justice and Attorney General of Canada Irwin Cotler and Freedom Now founder and human rights attorney Jared Genser. Puracal's case is being managed by The David House Agency, an international crisis resource agency based in Los Angeles. On September 12, 2012 he was one of 12 people whose charges were vacated, according to his legal team and a judicial order signed. As of September 14, 2012, he has left Nicaragua and returned to the U.S.

== Case facts ==
According to media reports, on November 11, 2010, police entered Puracal's home and office, taking him into custody. Puracal was charged with international drug trafficking, money laundering and organized crime. After being held in police custody for 8 months, on August 29, 2011, Puracal was convicted of all counts.

According to taped interviews on the Today show, former DEA Agent Tom Cash believes that there was an astounding lack of evidence presented by the prosecution. After reviewing the case, he believed no financial relationship was found between Puracal and the other defendants and that the evidence of money laundering was a misunderstanding of what a real estate escrow account is. This lack of evidence prompted the UN Working Group on Arbitrary Detention to rule that Puracal's imprisonment was, indeed, arbitrary and called for his immediate release. Further political figures have come forward in support of Puracal, including Congressman Adam Smith. Smith has publicly stated "They presented no evidence of a crime here. They have simply kidnapped and held him for a period of time and that is not in compliance with international law, it's not even in compliance with Nicaraguan law."

Puracal was sentenced to five years for organized crime, seven years for money laundering and ten years for international drug trafficking, totaling 22 years. Since his sentencing, Puracal has been held in La Modelo maximum-security prison outside of Managua. The appeals hearing for Puracal and his 10 co-defendants began On August 16, 2012. On September 12, 2012, he was acquitted of all charges by the Appeals Court.

== Case significance ==
Puracal's story has received a significant amount of media attention because of claims of lack of evidence and precedent set by the conviction.

Justin Brooks, director of the California Innocence Project said, "If the United States government does not vigorously fight for Jason's immediate release, other countries will realize all they have to do is call any case a 'drug' case and our government will not fight. They will know they can confiscate your property, throw you in prison and you will be powerless. We will all be at risk when we travel."

United States Congressman Adam Smith said that Puracal's arrest is tantamount to kidnapping. The three American hikers freed from Iran have spoken out against the American's conviction.

== History of wrongful imprisonment ==
This is the second major international trial of an American living in San Juan del Sur, Nicaragua. American Eric Volz was wrongfully convicted in the same town. After being imprisoned for 14 months, he was exonerated in December 2007. The New York Times said the Volz trial made a "spectacle of the courts". Volz is now the managing director of The David House Agency and has been identified in the media as the case manager leading the efforts to free Puracal.

== United Nations petition ==
On January 18, 2011, Puracal's sister, attorney Janis Puracal, along with co-council Jared Genser, filed a petition in the United Nation Working Group on Arbitrary Detention arguing that Puracal's August 29, 2011, conviction violated international law.

The petition also urged the United Nations to take "urgent action" in the case, citing "physical abuse and the denial of food, water and proper medical care" inside the prison.
