= Otabek Sattoriy =

Uzbekistani journalist

Otabek Sattoriy is an independent blogger and journalist from Uzbekistan. He was arrested on January 29, 2021, on charges of extortion and libel and was sentenced to six years and six months in prison. However, these charges likely resulted from Sattoriy's coverage of government corruption during the 2020-1 gas shortage.

== Background ==
Following the death of Islam Karimov in 2016, restrictions placed on the media in Uzbekistan loosened somewhat. As a result, many independent bloggers and journalists started posting on different social media platforms, such as Telegram.

Sattoriy ran a blog called Halq Fikiri (People's Opinion), on which he often covered alleged corruption by local officials.

== Arrest and trial ==
In December 2020, Sattoriy was confronted while filming a story about high prices at a market by a man who, “tried to prevent him from filming, forcefully taking his phone and then returning it broken.” When “the man gave Sattoriy a replacement, police detained the blogger and accused him of extorting the man to get the phone.” His lawyer described the charges as “fabricated.”

On July 15, 2021, an appeals court ruled against Sattoriy and upheld the charges.

On April 5, 2022, the Supreme Court upheld the sentence and charges.

== International response ==
The Committee to Protect Journalists wrote, “Uzbekistan authorities should immediately release journalist Otabek Sattoriy, not contest his appeal, and allow all journalists to work freely and without fear of reprisal,” in response to his arrest.

The US-based NGO Freedom Now filed a petition on the case to the United Nations Working Group on Arbitrary Detention.
