= Peter Donalek =

Peter Donalek from the MWH Global, Chicago, IL was named Fellow of the Institute of Electrical and Electronics Engineers (IEEE) in 2014 for contributions to grid-connected pumped storage hydro systems.
