= Eric Volz =

American entrepreneur and risk management specialist

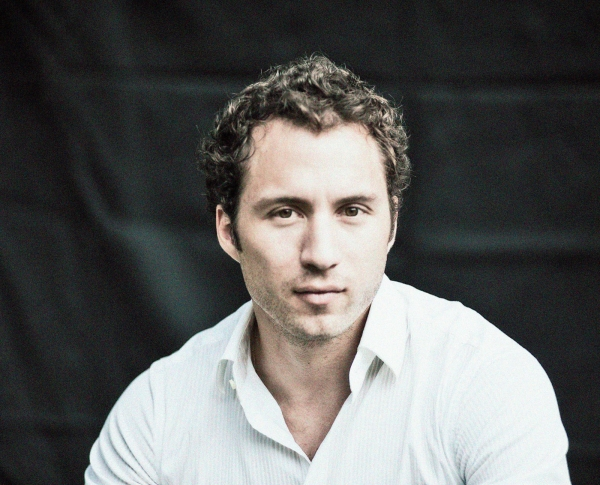
- Eric Volz, May 2010
- Born: May 19, 1979 (age 47)
- Occupations: Entrepreneur, risk management specialist, author

Eric Volz (born May 19, 1979) is an American entrepreneur, author, and the managing director of The David House Agency, an international crisis resource agency based in Los Angeles that specializes in wrongful imprisonment and politically motivated detentions abroad. The New York Times described Volz as a “highly sought crisis manager” for Americans facing criminal prosecutions overseas.

In 2007, Volz was wrongfully convicted of the November 2006 rape and murder of ex-girlfriend Doris Ivania Jiménez in San Juan del Sur, Nicaragua, and sentenced to 30 years in prison. An appellate court overturned the conviction on December 17, 2007, and Volz was released four days later. He left Nicaragua immediately due to death threats. Volz is listed in the Innocence Center's national database of exonerees.

Supporters insisted on Volz's innocence, arguing that the trial court ignored evidence and that anti-gringo sentiment influenced the outcome. Opponents in Nicaragua protested his release, citing what they perceived as preferential treatment as an American, U.S. government pressure, and accusations that Volz's family bribed the appellate court judges.

Upon his return to the United States, Volz wrote a memoir about his experience, Gringo Nightmare: A Young American Framed for Murder in Nicaragua. The book was published by St. Martin's Press.

Volz's involvement as a crisis manager has been reported in connection with several high-profile cases, including Matthew and Grace Huang, Jason Puracal, the American Hikers in Iran case, Amir Hekmati, Kenneth Bae, and Amanda Knox.

== Early life and education ==
Volz was born to Mexican-American parents in Northern California and raised in the Christian faith. Fluent in Spanish, he received a degree in Latin American Studies from the University of California, San Diego.

In 2004, Volz moved to Nicaragua, where he launched a bilingual magazine called El Puente ("EP Magazine"), established an investment consulting practice, and became co-owner of a local Century 21 franchise.

== Wrongful imprisonment ==
Volz's case has been documented as a wrongful conviction by the Innocence Center and examined in legal scholarship concerning unreliable witness testimony and miscarriages of justice. The case also attracted legal scrutiny and public attention, particularly regarding the conduct of the investigation and trial.

=== The murder and the suspects ===
On November 21, 2006, Doris Ivania Jiménez was murdered at midday in her clothing store, Sol Fashion, in San Juan del Sur, a coastal town near Rivas. Police issued warrants for four men. Two were local Nicaraguan men with prior records: Julio Martín Chamorro López (30), known as "Rosita," and Nelson Antonio López Danglas (24), known as "Krusty," both of whom bore physical scratches consistent with a struggle at the time of their arrest. A third suspect, college student Armando Llanes (20), was never arrested after his university provided a partial alibi. Volz, who had dated Jiménez before breaking up in mid-2006, was the fourth suspect.

Danglas was offered full immunity in exchange for testifying against Volz and was the only witness to place Volz near the crime scene. Chamorro later told a journalist that his testimony had been coerced by police.

=== The trial ===
Volz was arrested on November 23, 2006, and charged with murder. The defense presented ten alibi witnesses who placed him in Managua at the time of the crime, along with cell phone tower records and time-stamped instant-messaging logs. No physical evidence linked Volz to the crime, and exculpatory evidence was excluded. The trial judge, Ivette Toruño Blanco, excluded seven of the ten alibi witnesses on the grounds that their testimony would be redundant; those permitted to testify were not present with Volz at the time of the murder.

The trial was widely described as chaotic. On at least two occasions the courthouse was surrounded by protesters. At the conclusion of the three-day trial, Judge Toruño Blanco convicted Volz and sentenced him to 30 years in prison. The New York Times reported that the case "proved not who killed Ms. Jimenez, but that justice in Nicaragua is a nebulous concept, subjective to the point of abstraction."

=== Campaign for release ===
Volz's family and supporters launched the Free Eric Volz campaign, which included a YouTube documentary and a website called Friends of Eric Volz. The San Francisco Chronicle described it as an early example of social media being used to raise awareness about a wrongful imprisonment case. The case received substantial media coverage, including a front-page feature in the Wall Street Journal.

Notable investigative reports on Eric Volz
Media outlet	Title	Reporter
A&E	Nightmare in Nicaragua	Bill Kurtis
Esta Semana	Asesinato en San Juan del Sur: Irregularidades en el Caso Volz	Camilo de Castro
Outside Magazine	The Boomtown, the Gringo, the Girl, and Her Murder	Tony D'Souza
Men's Journal	A Season in Hell	Dean LaTourrette

=== Acquittal and release ===
On December 17, 2007, an appeals court overturned the conviction. The local judge delayed signing the release order, and Volz was not freed until December 21. His passport and $10,000 bail were not returned. He left Nicaragua immediately and went into hiding due to death threats. He is listed in the Innocence Center's national database of exonerees.

=== Political undertones ===
Former Communist leader Daniel Ortega had returned to power in Nicaragua shortly after Jiménez's death. A senior U.S. State Department official told media that the U.S. ambassador had raised the case with officials up to and including President Ortega, though the official noted concern that the Nicaraguan government did not want to appear to be yielding to international pressure. The Sandinista government's chief prosecutor described Volz's release as a "barbarity."

== International lawsuit: Volz v. Nicaragua ==
In 2009, Volz filed a 700-page petition, Volz v. Nicaragua, to the Inter-American Commission on Human Rights of the Organization of American States, after Nicaragua announced it was reopening the case against him. His lawyers argued that retrying an acquitted person violates Nicaragua's constitution and alleged political motivation for the action.

== Memoir ==
In May 2010, St. Martin's Press published Volz's memoir, Gringo Nightmare: A Young American Framed for Murder in Nicaragua. The book's foreword was written by investigative journalist Bill Kurtis. A paperback edition followed in May 2011. Publishers Weekly wrote that "there is much pain in Volz's memoir of being a young American in a near-perfect frame-up involving murder, tabloid headlines, police corruption, and political power plays in Nicaragua."

== Career ==
Following his wrongful imprisonment, Volz began advising families in similar situations, which evolved into a private consultancy in 2009. In 2011, he established The David House Agency. The New York Times described the agency as "a hybrid of international detective work, legal research, political analysis, and diplomatic lobbying."

Cases in which the agency has been involved include:

- Matthew and Grace Huang (Qatar) – American parents accused in the death of their adopted daughter; acquitted on appeal.
- Jason Puracal (Nicaragua) – U.S. citizen imprisoned on drug trafficking charges; conviction overturned.
- American Hikers in Iran case – Three U.S. citizens detained after crossing the Iranian border; later released.
- Amir Hekmati (Iran) – Former U.S. Marine sentenced to death on espionage charges; later released.
- Kenneth Bae (North Korea) – Missionary convicted and sentenced to hard labor; later released.
- Amanda Knox (Italy) – American student whose murder conviction was overturned on appeal.
- Raffaele Sollecito (Italy) – Italian student convicted alongside Knox; conviction also overturned.
- Scott McMahon (Philippines) – American acquitted of sexual assault after five years in prison.
