= MWH =

MWH may stand for:

- Grant County International Airport, in Washington State, United States, IATA airport code
- MWH Global, an international water engineering consultancy

== See also ==
- MWh, a megawatt hour of energy
- mWh, a milliwatt hour of energy
