= Erzhan Elshibayev =

Erzhan Elshibayev (born 1988) is a labor rights activist from Kazakhstan. In March, 2019, Elshibayev was arrested for allegedly starting a fight. He was later sentenced to five years in prison.

== Activism ==
Elshibayev is from the western city of Zhanaozen where he organized several rallies for unemployed individuals to petition authorities to address high unemployment levels, improve social security benefits, and implement democratic reforms. Local authorities attempted to end Elshibayev's activism by harassing him and eventually offering him a job if he ended the protests.

Throughout 2018 and into early 2019, Elshibayev continued organizing protests. In early 2019, he investigated by the police on charges of stealing a car and on charges of rape. Both charges were revealed to be unfounded and dropped.

== Arrest and sentence ==
Elshibayev's most recent arrest occurred on March 24, 2019. He was initially charged with "intentional infliction of grievous bodily harm from hooligan motives" and "hooliganism'". While in pre-trial detention, authorities pressured Elshibayev to decline speaking with media outlets, including Radio Free Europe/Radio Liberty.

Elshibayev was sentenced to five years in prison, after a trial that violated his due process rights. For example, he was prohibited from attending his own trial and was unable to hear or see a significant portion of the proceedings online due to poor internet connection.

While in prison, Elshibayev has suffered beatings and other forms of mistreatment. In June 2021, Elshibayev committed two acts of self-harm to protest his detention conditions.

In September 2022, he was sentenced to an additional seven years in prison.

== International response ==
Members of the European Parliament have repeatedly raised Elshibayev's case through written questions.

The human rights organization Freedom Now filed a petition with the UN Working Group on Arbitrary Detention on behalf of Elshibayev. In May 2021, the Working Group declared his detention to be in violation of international human rights law, and "requests the Government of Kazakhstan to take the steps necessary to remedy the situation of Mr. Elshibayev without delay and bring it into conformity with the relevant international norms."

Elshibayev remains in prison.
