= Lapiro de Mbanga =

Cameroonian musician (1957–2014)

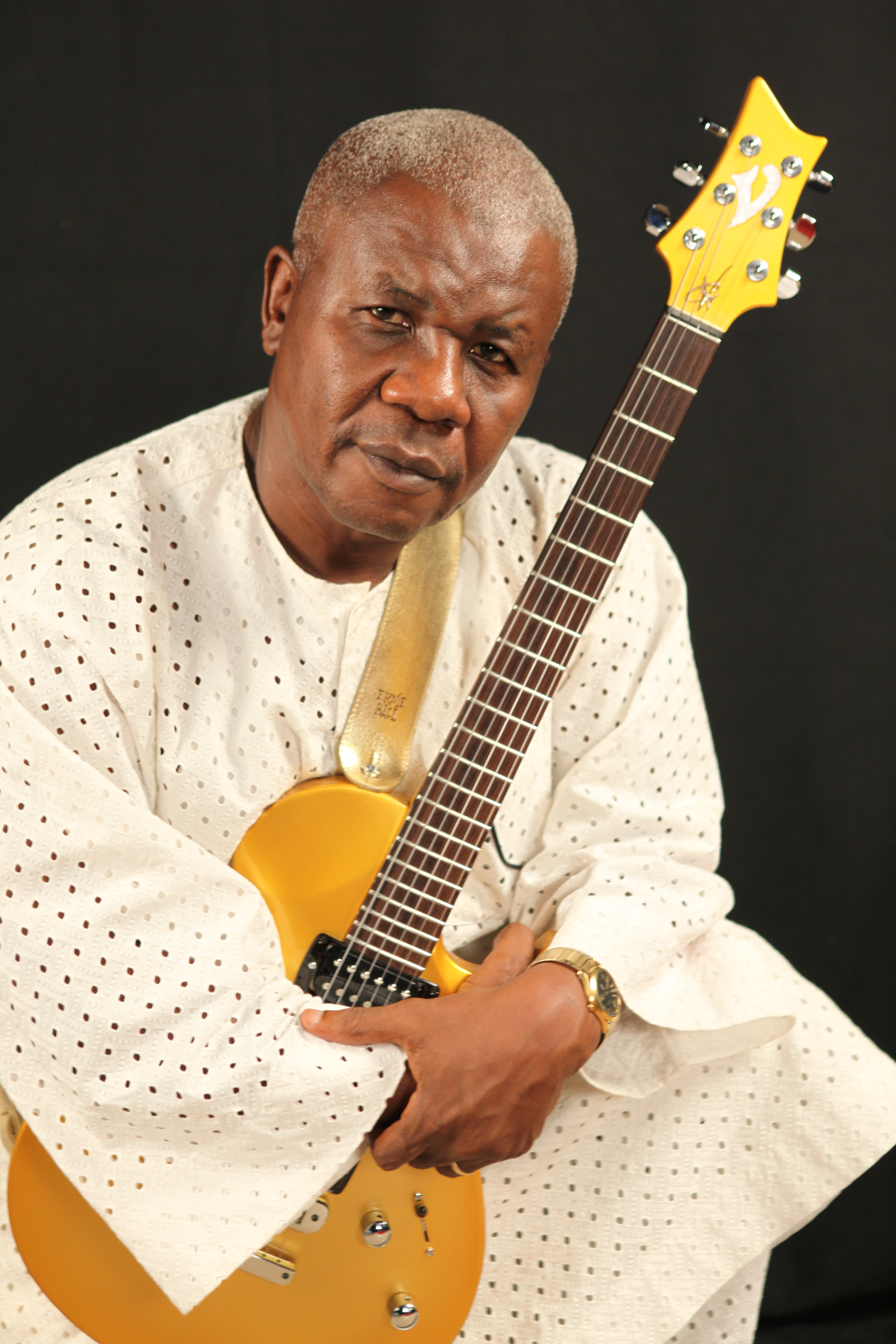
- Born: Lambo Sandjo Pierre Roger; 7 April 1957; Mbanga, Littoral, Cameroon
- Died: 16 March 2014 (aged 56); Buffalo, New York, U.S.
- Occupation: Musician
- Spouse: Louisette Noukeu

Lambo Sandjo Pierre Roger (7 April 1957 – 16 March 2014), better known as Lapiro de Mbanga, was a Cameroonian singer who is noted for his 1985 recording of "Pas argent no love" and for being imprisoned in 2008 after criticising Cameroon president Paul Biya in the song "Constitution constipée" ("Constipated Constitution").

== Music career ==
For several years, Lapiro's music career took him to West African countries like Nigeria and Benin where he recorded his first single that made no headway. He returned to Cameroon and then quickly moved to Gabon where he did his first popular song "Pas d'argent, no love" with Haissam Records. He returned in 1985 to Cameroon, where he proceeded to compose and record what Index on Censorship has described as "a long list of biting texts on the socio-economic realities in his beleaguered country." His first song in this regard was "No Make Erreur".

Nicknamed "the guitar man," Mbanga became "the idol of the downtrodden and forgotten workers who people the slums and bus stations of Cameroon" and "the spokesman for the youth of his country." His hits of that period included "No Make Erreur," "Surface de Reparation" "Kop Nie," "Mimba We," and "Na You." He was regularly censored by the Cameroonian government.

== Imprisonment ==
In 2008, Mbanga criticised Cameroon president Paul Biya in the song "Constitution constipée" ("Constipated Constitution"). The song denounced the proposed amendment of Cameroon's constitutional clause, which limited presidents to two seven-year terms. The Cameroonian government banned "Constitution constipée" from the airways, however thousands of Cameroonians students used the song as an anthem as they rallied and rioted in the streets in February 2008 in protest against the proposed constitutional change, which would allow Biya to run for a new term in 2011.

Mbanga was arrested on 9 April 2008, and charged with "complicity in looting, destruction of property, arson, obstructing streets, degrading public or classified property, and forming illegal gatherings." Two days later, the Cameroonian parliament adopted the new constitution that Mbanga had attacked in "Constitution constipée."

On 24 September 2008, Mbanga was sentenced by the Tribunal de Grande Instance (TGI) to three years in the New Bell prison near Douala. In December 2009 he contracted typhoid fever and nearly died of that disorder and respiratory complications. When authorities refused to send him to a hospital, his wife brought medications that helped save his life. In an interview, Mbanga said that he and his fellow prisoners had "penal rations twice a day. At 1pm we are given boiled corn and at 5pm there's rice in some warm water. It's the same every day. It's way below minimum requirements."

Freemuse, a Danish-based NGO, mounted an international campaign for Mbanga's release. In a 2010 interview from prison, he said that "If my wife didn't travel four hours here and four hours back every day to give me food and if Freemuse hadn't publicised my case worldwide, I'd have been dead long ago."

In addition to Freemuse's campaign, the US-based lawyers' organisation Freedom Now monitored Mbanga's case throughout his incarceration. In April 2010, the Writers in Prison Committee of International PEN also launched a campaign to help win Mbanga's freedom. In 2011, the United Nations Working Group on Arbitrary Detention declared that Mbanga's arrest was an infringement of the International Covenant on Civil and Political Rights.

During his detention, Mbanga repeatedly appealed his conviction to the Supreme Court. On 17 March 2011, he refused to take advantage of an offer from the Supreme Court to be released on bail. Mbanga was released from prison on 8 April 2011, one day before the official end of his sentence.

== Post-imprisonment ==
In a July 2011 interview, Mbanga described the prisons in which he had been incarcerated as "rotten" and insisted that he had never encouraged young people to damage and steal other people's property. "I've never done anything of the sort. Instead, I did everything to prevent that from happening." He called his trial "Kafkaesque", saying that his fate had been "decided in advance," despite the utter lack of evidence against him.

On 13 July 2011, in Lille, France, Mbanga returned to the stage for the first time since his release from prison. During the summer of 2011 he also played in Lausanne, Brussels, Paris, Barcelona, and at various venues in the United States, Canada, and Britain.

On 2 September 2012, Mbanga, his wife, and three of their children left Cameroon for the United States, where they had been granted asylum. They arrived in the US on 14 September. A few days later Lapiro was rushed to The Buffalo Oncology Hospital with sickness and acute abdominal pain. On 8 October he was due to have his portrait painted by UK artist Paul Piercy for The Black Portraits project. Piercy had to set up to paint the portrait on the ward. During the painting Lapiro, though still very ill was in good spirits and was discharged in order to continue with the portrait at home and be painted in his Cameroon chieftain's costume. On his portrait he signed 'I am Lapiro Paul Piercy thanks to immortalise me forever. Lapiro free from prison'.

In late 2012 it was reported that Mbanga was seeking a publisher for his book Cabale Politico-Judiciaire Ou La Mort Programmée D'Un Combatant De La Liberté (Politico-Judicial Cabal or the Planned Death of a Freedom Fighter). The book is set for release late this year.

In 2013 Mbanga's case was reopened before the Cameroonian Supreme Court. He died on 16 March 2014. The Supreme Court in June 2013 annulled the TGI judgment and ordered a retrial.

== Personal life ==
In 2014, Lapiro died of cancer in Buffalo, New York.
