= Gringo Nightmare =

2010 memoir by Eric Volz

Gringo Nightmare: A Young American Framed for Murder in Nicaragua
- Author: Eric Volz
- Language: English
- Subject: Wrongful conviction, memoir
- Genre: Memoir, true crime
- Publisher: St. Martin's Press
- Publication date: 2010
- Publication place: United States
- Pages: 304 pages
- ISBN: 0312584172

Gringo Nightmare: A Young American Framed for Murder in Nicaragua (2010) is a memoir by American writer Eric Volz, published by St. Martin's Press. The book recounts Volz's arrest, trial, wrongful conviction and imprisonment, and subsequent release after the conviction in Nicaragua was overturned. The events described in the memoir were covered by international media and have been discussed in journalistic and academic sources.

== Background ==
In November 2006, Doris Jiménez was raped and murdered in San Juan del Sur, Nicaragua. Volz, a U.S. citizen living in Nicaragua at the time, was arrested and charged with the crime. He was convicted in 2007 and sentenced to 30 years in prison.

The case drew international attention, including coverage in The New York Times, which examined concerns about the conduct of the investigation and trial. Volz's conviction was overturned by a Nicaraguan appellate court on December 17, 2007, and he was released shortly thereafter.

== Summary ==
The memoir provides a first-person account of Volz's arrest, detention, and imprisonment in Nicaragua. It discusses prison conditions, legal proceedings, and media coverage of the case, as well as advocacy efforts undertaken in the United States on his behalf. The book incorporates excerpts from legal documents, personal correspondence, and photographs related to the case.

The book was edited by Charlie Spicer, with a foreword by journalist Bill Kurtis.

== Reception ==
Publishers Weekly described Gringo Nightmare as "a near perfect frame-up involving murder, tabloid headlines, police corruption and political power plays in Nicaragua."

A review in Outside noted the book's detailed account of the case and its depiction of prison conditions in Central America.

Legal scholar Justin Brooks referenced the book in the University of Cincinnati Law Review in a discussion of systemic challenges in criminal justice systems and the use of witness testimony.
