= The David House Agency =

International crisis resource agency

David House Agency
- Formation: 2011
- Founder: Eric Volz
- Purpose: international crisis resource
- Location: Los Angeles

The David House Agency is a Los Angeles-based international crisis resource agency that helps international travelers facing wrongful imprisonment and other complex legal and political situations abroad.

The David House Agency was founded in 2011 by Eric Volz after his own experience of wrongful detainment in Nicaragua. In an article about the agency, The New York Times describes it as "a hybrid of international detective work, legal research, political analysis, and diplomatic lobbying." The agency works on all aspects of international detainment cases, including case management, hiring and managing of local counsel, fundraising guidance, strategic communications, private diplomacy and lobbying, and aftercare measures.

== High Profile Cases ==
The agency has been at the center of many high-profile cases overseas. Most recently, the David House Agency worked on the wrongful conviction case of Matthew and Grace Huang, a Los Angeles couple erroneously accused of starving their 8-year-old adopted daughter to death in Qatar in January 2013. Their conviction was overturned in December 2014, ending a two-year legal saga and lift of a travel ban—enabling the couple to leave Qatar and reunite with their two sons in the US.

The agency also aided Amir Mirzaei Hekmati, a 28-year-old former U.S. Marine convicted of spying for the CIA in Iran, Jason Puracal, an American who was wrongfully imprisoned in Nicaragua on charges of international drug trafficking, money laundering and organized crime, and the three American hikers taken into custody and accused of spying by Iranian border guards while hiking in Iraqi Kurdistan.
