= Alissa Bjerkhoel =

American wrongful conviction advocate

Alissa L. Bjerkhoel
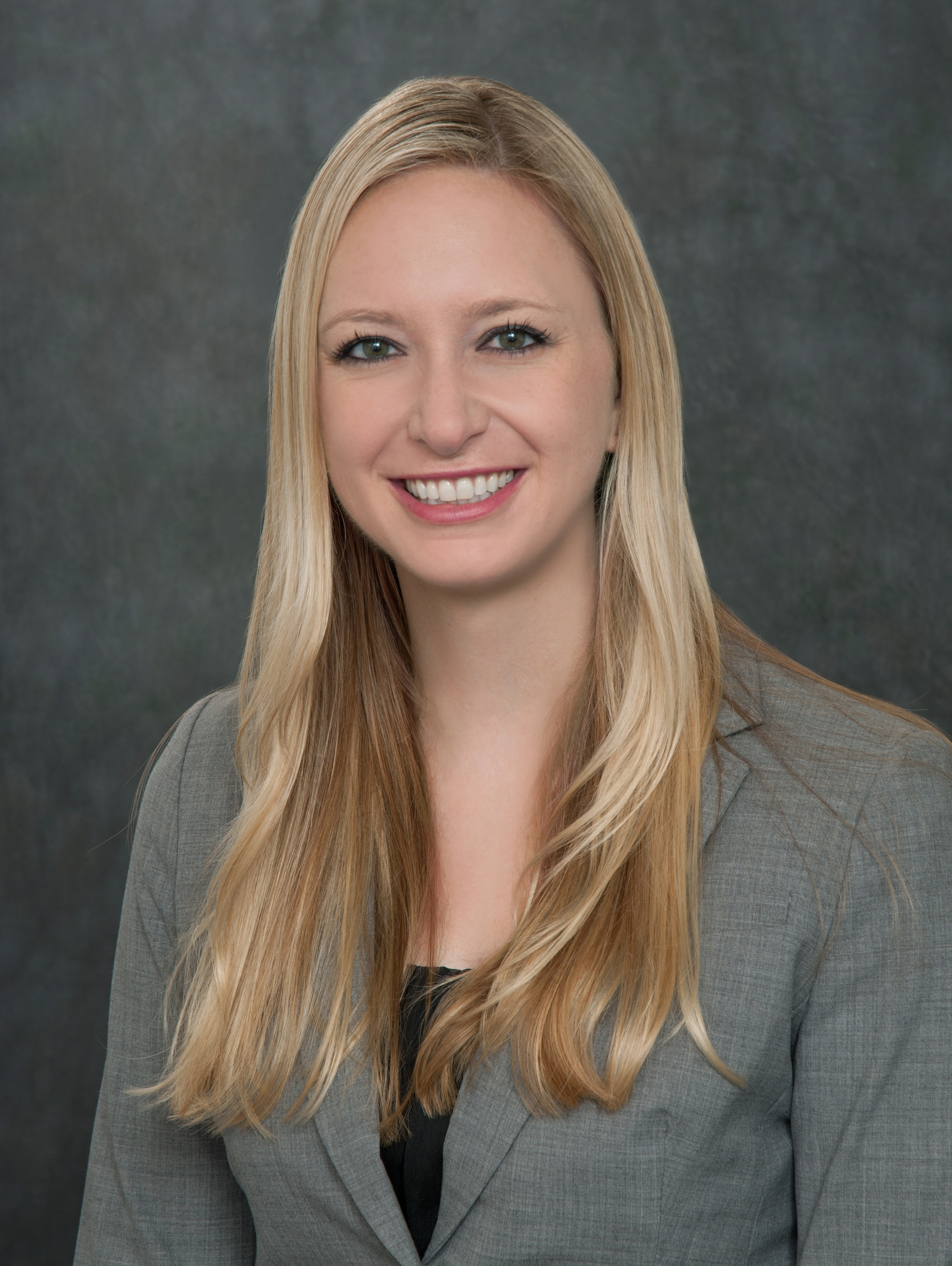
- Bjerkhoel in 2013
- Pronunciation: byeer-kul
- Born: Truckee, California, U.S.
- Education: University of California, Santa Barbara (BA)
- Alma mater: California Western School of Law (CWSL) (JD)
- Occupation: Superior Court Judge
- Years active: 2023-Present
- Employer: California Western School of Law
- Known for: Legal exoneration of convicted prisoners DNA forensic expertise
- Title: Litigation Coordinator
- Spouse: Steven Foley (m. 2015)
- Children: 1
- Awards: Post-Conviction Lawyer of the Year - Criminal Defense Bar Association of San Diego (2006); Young Attorney of the Year finalist (2011); California Lawyer Attorney of the Year, Criminal Division (2012) (See Awards section below)

Alissa Leanne Bjerkhoel (pronounced byeer-kul) Is a Superior Court Judge for Nevada County, California. She was appointed to the bench on November 23 2023, and started serving on December 4 of same year.

Prior to this she was an American litigation coordinator at the California Innocence Project (CIP). In 2013, Bjerkhoel walked from San Diego to Sacramento to protest the incarceration of twelve inmates she considered innocent, and presented twelve petitions for the convicted to the governor to raise awareness of the issue of the wrongly convicted.

== Legal education ==
After graduating from the University of California, Santa Barbara with a B.A. degree in history in 2004, Bjerkhoel entered California Western School of Law in 2005. In her second year at CWSL, Bjerkhoel became a clinical intern with the program, continued to work on cases in her third year and, after graduation in 2008, became one of CIP's first full-time staff attorneys.

In the fall of 2007, Bjerkhoel went to the Defensoría Penal Pública de Santiago in Santiago, Chile, to assist the institution's education department in training new public defenders. She taught how to conduct direct examination, cross-examination, the opening statement and the closing argument. She drafted a comprehensive treatise, in both English and Spanish, for the Defensoría detailing the history, rules, examples and cases of Criminal Procedure and the Federal Rules of Evidence. She also organized and presented a seminar ("A Pragmatic Approach to Evidence") to the Defensoría, Ministerio Público, judges and the media. While in Chile, Bjerkhoel met with indigenous Mapuche people, as their lawyers discussed the legal problems of these peoples, who are located in Chile's southern regions.

Immediately prior to her work with CIP, Bjerkhoel worked as a judicial extern for Judge Jan Adler of the United States District Court for the Southern District of California. In that capacity, she evaluated pro se writs of habeas corpus and drafted and submitted report and recommendations on the merits of writs. She observed the inner workings of the federal judicial system by attending criminal calendar, observed initial negotiation and settlement conferences, and attended trials on civil rights violations.

== CIP work ==
=== Prominent cases ===
==== Brian Banks ====
The 2002 conviction of All Star linebacker Brian Banks on false charges of rape and kidnapping was dismissed in 2012, directly due to the efforts of the California Innocence Project. Following his initial arrest for the alleged crimes, Banks, despite his protestations of innocence, faced a possible conviction, if the case had gone to trial, of 41-years-to-life, and reluctantly agreed to a plea bargain. He was then given an unexpectedly harsh sentence of six years in prison (of which he served five years and two months), followed by five years' probation and registration as a sex offender.

After his release on probation, he arranged for a meeting with his accuser, Wanetta Gibson (who had contacted him through Facebook), at which she admitted on video that there had been no rape or kidnapping in 2002, and that their encounter had been completely consensual. The video evidence was not admissible in court, because the video had been made without Gibson's knowledge or consent and was not accompanied by a signed confession from the young woman. However, CIP was instrumental in putting together additional evidence supporting Banks' story, which led the district attorney to dismiss all charges against him and release him from sex-offender status, allowing him to resume his aborted sports career. Bjerkhoel was present in the courtroom with Banks on May 24, 2012, the day that his conviction was finally dismissed.

Banks supports CIP in its efforts on behalf of the wrongly-convicted, including participating in CIP's 2013 Innocence March. He often wears a shirt with the lettering "XONR8" ("exonerate"). A film project based on Banks' story, co-executive produced by Banks himself and Justin Brooks of CIP and directed by Tom Shadyac, was released in 2018, with Tiffany Dupont portraying Bjerkhoel.

==== Daniel Larsen ====
Based largely on eyewitness identification by two police officers, Daniel Larsen was convicted in 1999 of being in possession of a concealed knife under California's Three Strikes Law. Because he had prior felony convictions, Larsen was sentenced to 28 years to life in prison. The California Innocence Project, which began representing Larsen in 2002, found witnesses, including a former chief of police and the actual owner of the knife, who testified seeing a different man holding the knife. In 2010, a judge ordered Larsen's release, finding that he was "actually innocent" of the crime and that Larsen's constitutional rights were violated, because his attorney was incompetent.

Despite the ruling, Larsen remained in prison for two more years while state attorney general Kamala Harris challenged the judge's ruling because Larsen had missed the appeal deadline. In September 2013, the 9th U.S. Circuit Court of Appeals upheld the lower court ruling and freed Larsen after 14 years in prison.

=== The Innocence March ===
From April to June 2013, Bjerkhoel, CIP director Justin Brooks and managing attorney Michael Semanchik, along with many California Innocence Project exonerees and supporters, participated in an event they called "The Innocence March." Determined to gain clemency from Governor Jerry Brown for twelve convicted prisoners whom they deemed to be "100 percent innocent," as well as to gain public awareness of the plight of wrongfully convicted prisoners, they walked a 700-mile route from the CIP's offices in San Diego to the Capitol at Sacramento to formally present their petitions on behalf of the twelve to the governor.

The march reached its destination in fifty-one days, four days earlier than the original 55-day schedule. In December of the same year, the California Innocence Project recreated the final (Sacramento) leg of the original march, from Raley Field to the governor's office at the Capitol. Although Gov. Brown did not grant clemency to any of the twelve, the march resulted in extensive press coverage. The Innocence March was selected by San Diego Magazine as one of the "27 Reasons to Love SD [San Diego] Now." Several of the prisoners named in the petition (including Guy Miles and Kim Long) were subsequently released through CIP's efforts.
