= Tiffany Dupont =

American actress

- Born: March 22, 1981 (age 45)
- Occupation: Actress
- Years active: 2002–present
- Spouse: Cristiano Green (m. 2021; div. 2023)
- Children: 1

Tiffany Dupont (born March 22, 1981) is an American actress, known for playing the lead character, Hadassah, a Jewish girl who will become the Biblical Esther, Queen of Persia, in the Hollywood film One Night with the King. From 2007 to 2009, Dupont co-starred on the ABC Family series Greek, where she played Frannie, who was head of the Iota Kappa Iota house which she founded on campus to rival ZBZ.

== Life ==
Dupont has stated that she is of half Italian and half Dutch descent; she also has one-eighth Surinamese and Guyanese ancestry.

Dupont has been described as a "committed Christian" and at the time of her appearance as Esther said she only wanted to play wholesome roles. In September 2021, Dupont announced on her Instagram that she was engaged to her boyfriend of two years, Cristiano Basso and that she was also expecting their first child. In October 2021, she announced the birth of their daughter, Venice Louise via Instagram.

== Filmography ==
=== Film ===
Title	Year	Role
Cheaper by the Dozen	2003	Beth
The Work and the Glory	2004	Lydia McBride
One Night with the King	2006	Hadassah / Esther
Bickford Shmeckler's Cool Ideas	2006	
He's Such a Girl	2009	Taylor
Hijacked	2012	Olivia Rousseau
Born to Race: Fast Track	2014	Michelle
Brian Banks	2019	Alissa Bjerkhoel

=== Television ===
Title	Year	Role	Notes
Yes, Dear	2002	Sammy's Girlfriend	Episode: "Sammy's Independence Day"
Joan of Arcadia	2003		Episode: "The Fire and the Wood"
Grounded for Life	2004	Colleen	Episode: "My Ex-Boyfriend's Back"
The Bedford Diaries	2006	Sara Gregory	Lead role, 8 episodes
Greek	2007–2011	Frannie Morgan	Lead role, 40 episodes
CSI: Crime Scene Investigation	2007	Cammie Brookston	Episode: "Empty Eyes"
Melrose Place	2009	Call Girl	Episode: "Shoreline"
Outlaw	2010	Abigail Hoffman	Episode: "Pilot"
The Whole Truth	2010	Monica Gerwig	Episode: "Thicker Than Water"
CSI: NY	2010	Hayley Montgommery	Episode: "Hide Sight"
90210	2010	Julia	Episode: "They're Playing Her Song"
NCIS	2011	Kimberly Nolan	Episode: "Ships in the Night"
The Big Bang Theory	2011	Angela	Episode: "The Wildebeest Implementation"
The Glades	2011	Lori Fisher	Episode: "Addicted to Love"
CSI: Miami	2012	Rachel Petrella	Episode: "Last Straw"
Castle	2012	Greta Mastroianni	Episode: "Undead Again"
Franklin & Bash	2012	Alyssa	Episode: "Summer Girls"
Supernatural	2013	Gilda	Episode: "LARP and the Real Girl"
Hawaii Five-0	2013	Crimson Bride	Episode: "Na Ki'i (Dolls)"
Mom	2014	Alicia	Episode: "Jail, Jail and Japanese Porn"
NCIS: L.A.	2014	Dana Steele	Episode: "Exposure"
Anger Management	2014	Jenna	Episode: "Charlie Has a Threesome"
Reckless	2014	Lexi Simms	Episode: "When the Smoke Clears"
Love Finds You in Charm	2015	Kelly Bennett	TV movie
Murder in the First	2016	Serena Parrish	Recurring role, 6 episodes
Scorpion	2017	Joan Davis	Episode: "Sharknerdo"
Star	2018	Lena	3 episodes
9-1-1	2018	Ali Martin	3 episodes
Proven Innocent	2019	Nikki Castro	Recurring
American Horror Stories	2021	Addy Gantz	Episode: "Feral"
The Irrational	2023	Blair Dalton	Episode: "The Real Deal"

=== Music videos ===
Title	Year	Notes
"Natural Disaster"	2008	Single from Big Bad World by Plain White T's
