= Brian Banks (American football) =

American football player (born 1985)

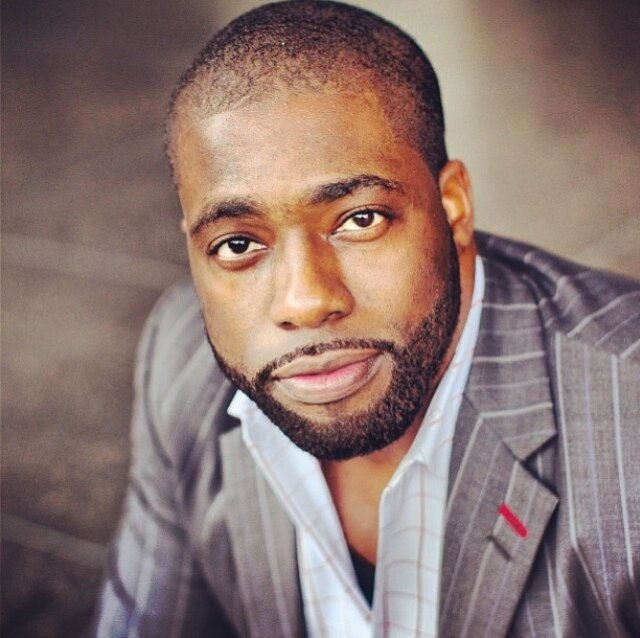
- Banks in 2018

No. 53, 55
- Position: Linebacker

Personal information
- Born: July 24, 1985 (age 41); Long Beach, California, U.S.
- Listed height: 6 ft 4 in (1.93 m)
- Listed weight: 249 lb (113 kg)

Career information
- High school: Long Beach Polytechnic
- College: Long Beach City College
- NFL draft: 2007: undrafted

Career history
- Las Vegas Locomotives (2012); Atlanta Falcons (2013)*
- * Offseason or practice squad member only

Brian Keith Banks (born July 24, 1985) is an American former professional football player. He signed with the Atlanta Falcons of the National Football League (NFL) on April 3, 2013. Banks signed as an undrafted free agent with the Las Vegas Locomotives of the United Football League (UFL) in 2012.

Banks was a standout high school football star at Polytechnic High School (Poly) in Long Beach, California. In 2002, his Junior year, Banks verbally committed to USC. After being falsely accused of rape by classmate Wanetta Gibson, he spent close to six years imprisoned and five years on parole. In 2012, his conviction was overturned when his accuser confessed that she had fabricated the entire story. Following his exoneration, Banks sought to resume his football career, playing for the now-defunct UFL, attending mini-camps for several NFL teams, and later signing with the Atlanta Falcons.

== Early life ==
A native of Long Beach, California, Banks attended Long Beach Polytechnic High School, where he was teammates with DeSean Jackson, Darnell Bing, Winston Justice, and Marcedes Lewis. He was named one of Rivals.com's "Juniors to Watch" of the class of 2003.

== Professional career ==
In the summer of 2012, Banks received tryouts with several NFL teams, including the Kansas City Chiefs, San Diego Chargers, and San Francisco 49ers. He attended minicamp with the Seattle Seahawks, whose head coach, Pete Carroll, had offered Banks a scholarship in 2002 when he was head coach at USC.

=== Las Vegas Locomotives ===
Banks signed with the Las Vegas Locomotives of the UFL on September 20, 2012, appearing in two games–his first meaningful game action since playing in his last high school game more than 11 years earlier. He made one tackle before the UFL suspended its season in October.

=== Atlanta Falcons ===
Banks signed with the Atlanta Falcons on April 3, 2013, participating in offseason workouts, OTAs, and training camp. Banks made his NFL debut in a preseason game against the Cincinnati Bengals, where he picked up two tackles. He played four preseason games with the Falcons before being released on August 30, 2013.

=== National Football League (NFL) ===
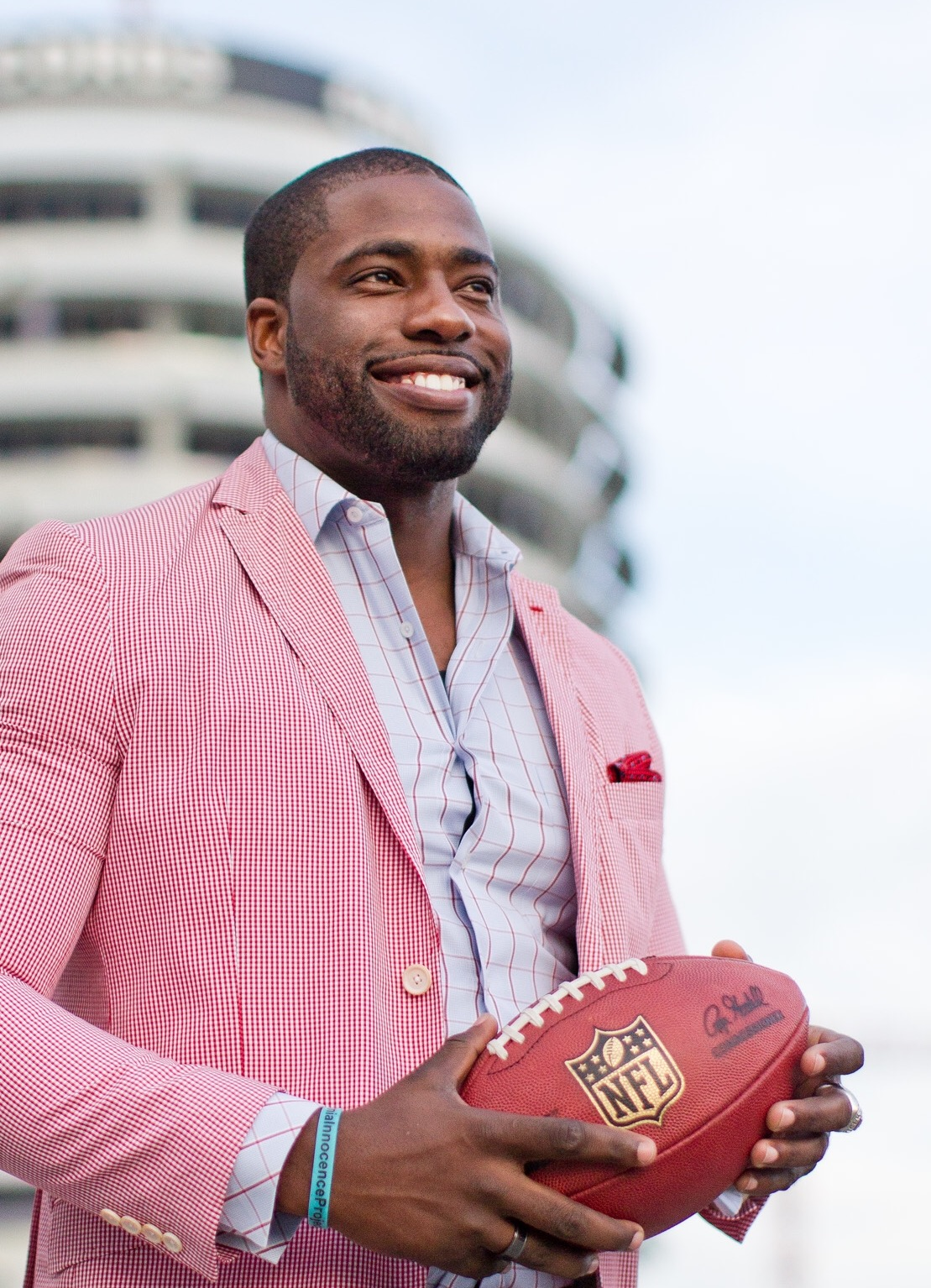
Brian Banks after his exoneration

In 2014, Banks was asked by NFL Commissioner Roger Goodell to speak at the 2014 NFL draft Rookie Symposium. Banks accepted and his speech was well received. A few weeks later, he was hired to join the NFL Department of Operations.

== Personal life ==
In May 2015, Banks married Emmy Marino. They had no children and filed for divorce in February 2017.

== False accusation of sexual assault ==
In the summer of 2002, aged 16, Banks was arrested and charged after classmate Wanetta Gibson falsely accused him of dragging her into a stairway and raping her. He was expelled from Long Beach Polytechnic High School shortly after being taken into custody and placed at Juvenile Hall. Shawn Ashley, who was a co-principal of Long Beach Poly High, had claimed that Banks would not be allowed back on campus regardless of any jurisdictional outcome. Faced with a possible 41-year-to-life sentence, he accepted a plea bargain that included six years in prison, five years of probation, and registering as a sex offender. Banks stated that he took the deal after his lawyer told him that he stood almost no chance at trial because he would likely be tried by an all-white jury who would only see "a big, black teenager." According to Banks, his lawyer convinced him that by pleading no contest he would receive probation, but no jail time. With only ten minutes to decide and denied the right to counsel with his mother, Banks took the deal.

Gibson and her mother, Wanda Rhodes, sued the Long Beach Unified School District, claiming the Poly campus was not a safe environment, and won a $1.5 million settlement.

=== Confession of false accusation ===
In March 2011, Gibson contacted Banks on Facebook, met with him, and admitted in the presence of a private investigator Banks had hired that she had fabricated the story. Banks secretly recorded Gibson's confession, but she later (according to Banks and his private investigator) refused to tell prosecutors that she had lied so that she would not have to return the money that she and her family had won in court.

=== California Innocence Project ===
Before the taped confession, Banks had asked for help from the California Innocence Project (CIP), a nonprofit law school clinic run by the San Diego–based California Western School of Law that investigates and litigates cases of actual innocence. At that time, however, there had not been sufficient evidence of Banks's innocence for them to take on the case. However, after the confession, CIP decided to make it the organization's first case involving a wrongfully convicted person who had already been released from prison.

The video evidence was not admissible in court because the video had been made without Gibson's knowledge or consent and was not accompanied by a signed confession from her. However, CIP was instrumental in putting together additional evidence supporting Banks' story, which led the district attorney to ask the judge to reverse the conviction on May 24, 2012. Banks was also relieved of his record as a sex offender, allowing him to resume his sports career.

Banks supports CIP in its efforts on behalf of the wrongly convicted, participating in CIP's 2013 Innocence March.

=== School lawsuit ===
In 2013, the Long Beach Unified School District won a $2.6 million judgment against Gibson, recouping $750,000 paid to her along with attorney's fees, interest, and $1 million in punitive damages; Gibson failed to appear in court.

== Film adaptation ==
A feature film project based on Banks' story, co-executive produced by Banks and Justin Brooks of CIP, premiered in 2018 and was released in August 2019. It is directed by Tom Shadyac and features Aldis Hodge as Banks, Morgan Freeman as Jerome Johnson, Greg Kinnear as Justin Brooks and Tiffany Dupont as CIP attorney Alissa Bjerkhoel.

== See also ==
- List of wrongful convictions in the United States
