= Jared Genser =

International human rights lawyer (born 1972)

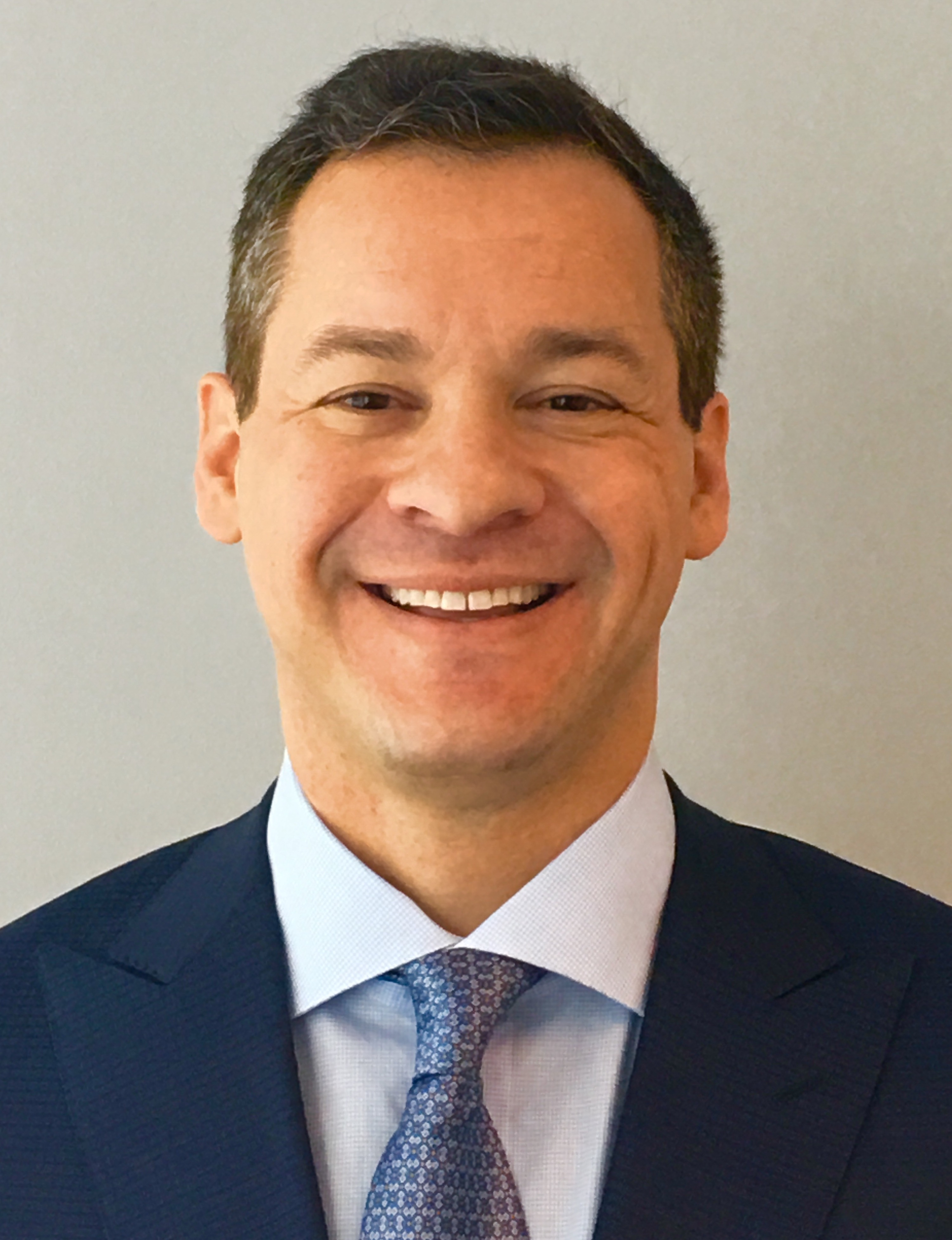

Personal details
- Born: June 17, 1972 (age 54) New Haven, Connecticut
- Education: University of Michigan (JD); Harvard University (MPP); Cornell University (BA)
- Occupation: Human Rights Lawyer, Special Advisor to the Organization of American States
- Awards: Charles Bronfman Prize (2010); ABA International Human Rights Award (2013); Tällberg/Eliasson Global Leadership Prize (2020)

Jared Genser (born June 17, 1972) is an international human rights lawyer who serves as managing director of the law firm Perseus Strategies, LLC, Special Advisor on the Responsibility to Protect to the Organization of American States, and Co-Founder and General Counsel to the Neurorights Foundation. Genser is U.S. Chair of the Raoul Wallenberg Centre for Human Rights, where he was previously a Senior Fellow. Referred to by the New York Times as "The Extractor", he has served as pro bono counsel to five Nobel Peace Prize Laureates, including the last three Laureates who won their Prize while imprisoned- Aung San Suu Kyi (Burma, 2006-2010), Liu Xiaobo (China, 2010-2017), and Ales Bialiatski (Belaruse, 2023-Present) -- as well as Archbishop Desmond Tutu and Elie Wiesel. Other former clients have included former Czech Republic President Václav Havel, Malaysia Prime Minister Anwar Ibrahim, Venezuelan politician Leopoldo López, and former Maldives President Mohamed Nasheed. He was previously an associate of the Carr Center for Human Rights Policy at Harvard University from 2014 to 2016 and a visiting fellow with the National Endowment for Democracy from 2006 to 2007. Coming from his experience freeing a political prisoner as a law student in 2001, he founded the nonprofit Freedom Now and earlier in his career was named by the National Law Journal as one of "40 Under 40: Washington's Rising Stars".

== Early life and education ==
Genser was born in New Haven, Connecticut, and grew up in suburban Maryland. He was a participant in the Raoul Wallenberg Scholar program at Hebrew University of Jerusalem. Genser received a B.S. from Cornell University. He subsequently earned a Master in Public Policy degree from the John F. Kennedy School of Government at Harvard University, where he was an Alumni Public Service Fellow and a J.D. cum laude from the University of Michigan Law School.

== Career ==
Genser began his career as a management consultant with McKinsey & Company. He later joined the global law firm DLA Piper, where he was elected a partner. In 2011, he left DLA Piper to found Perseus Strategies, a human-rights law firm. Genser has previously been an adjunct professor of law at Georgetown University Law Center, the University of Michigan Law School and University of Pennsylvania Law School. In October 2020, Genser was appointed by OAS Secretary General Luis Almagro as Special Advisor on the Responsibility to Protect for the Organization of American States.

== Writings ==
=== Books ===
Genser is the author of The UN Working Group on Arbitrary Detention: Commentary and Guide to Practice (Cambridge University Press, 2019; ISBN 9781107034457). He was also co-editor with Canadian Member of Parliament Irwin Cotler of The Responsibility to Protect: The Promise of Stopping Mass Atrocities in Our Time (Cambridge University Press, 2012; ISBN 978-0199797769) and he is co-editor with former Minister of Foreign Affairs of Costa Rica Bruno Stagno Ugarte for The UN Security Council in the Age of Human Rights (Cambridge University Press, 2013; ISBN 978-1107040076).

=== Human rights reports ===
Genser has authored or co-authored numerous major human rights reports, including:

Country focused

- Perseus Strategies, The Imprisonment of Political Prisoners as Policy: Arbitrary Detentions, Disappearances, and Torture of Regime Opponents in Daniel Ortega’s Nicaragua, May 2023
- Perseus Strategies, The Kremlin’s Political Prisoners: Advancing a Political Agenda While Crushing Dissent, Co-Commissioned by Free Russia Foundation, Human Rights Foundation, Lantos Foundation for Human Rights and Justice, and the Raoul Wallenberg Centre for Human Rights, May 1, 2019
- DLA Piper LLP and the Jacob Blaustein Institute for the Advancement of Human Rights, Myanmar Rule of Law Needs Assessment, March 2013
- DLA Piper LLP, Failure to Protect: A Call for the UN Security Council to Act in North Korea, Commissioned by Former Czech Republic President Vaclav Havel, Elie Wiesel, and Former Norwegian Prime Minister Kjell Magne Bondevik, October 2006.
- DLA Piper Rudnick Gray Cary LLP, Threat to the Peace: A Call for the UN Security to Act in Burma, September 2005.

As OAS Special Advisor on the Responsibility to Protect

- Jared Genser, The Responsibility to Protect and the Organization of American States: A Path Forward For Atrocity Prevention and Response in the Americas, Organization of American States, September 15, 2022.
- Jared Genser, Fostering Impunity: The Impact of the Failure of the Prosecutor of the International Criminal Court to Open an Investigation Into the Possible Commission of Crimes Against Humanity in Venezuela, Organization of American States, December 2, 2020

Neurotechnology and human rights

- Jared Genser, Rafael Yuste, and Stephanie Herrmann, International Human Rights Protection Gaps in the Age of Neurotechnology, Neurorights Foundation, May 6, 2022
- Jared Genser, Rafael Yuste, and Stephanie Herrmann, It’s Time for Neuro-Rights: New Human Rights for the Age of Neurotechnology, 18 Horizons 154-164, Winter 2021.

Other themes

- Perseus Strategies, Covington & Burling, and Crowell & Moring, The Women, Peace, and Security Agenda at the UN Security Council, Commissioned by Human Rights Foundation and Funded by Shin Kong Life Foundation, September 24, 2015.

=== Law review articles and op-eds ===
Genser has published numerous law review articles and more than 130 op-eds on human rights topics in major newspapers around the world. Among law review articles, he has published them on a diverse array of topics including the UN Security Council's application on the responsibility to protect, the Future of the UN Human Rights System, and the EU trade sanctions on Burma, among other topics.

He has published op-eds in such newspapers as The Baltimore Sun, The Boston Globe, The Chosun Ilbo (Seoul), Far Eastern Economic Review, The Huffington Post, The Independent (UK), International Herald Tribune, The Jakarta Post, Los Angeles Times, South China Morning Post, The Sydney Morning Herald, The Nation (Thailand), The Star (South Africa), The Times (UK), The Wall Street Journal, The New York Times, and The Washington Post.

== Other activities and awards ==
Genser is a life member of the Council on Foreign Relations and a Fellow of the Royal Society of Arts. He was elected in 2008 as a Fellow to the British American Project. In 2009 he was elected as a delegate to the Asia Society's Asia 21 Young Leaders Summit and also as a U.S.-Japan Young Leadership Fellow. Genser was a Young Global Leader of the World Economic Forum from 2008 to 2013 and a Member of the World Economic Forum's Global Agenda Council for Human Rights (2010–2011). In 2011, he was selected among the Young Leaders of the French-American Foundation. He is a recipient of the Charles Bronfman Prize and Liberty in North Korea's Freedom Fighter Award. In addition to being qualified to practice law in Maryland and the District of Columbia, he is also a solicitor of England & Wales. Gesner co-founded the Neurorights Foundation with neuroscientist Rafael Yuste after both won Global Leadership Prizes from the Tällberg Foundation. Genser is also an avid ice hockey player, playing on both the Titans and the Crunch through Hockey North America.
