= MWH Global =

Global water and natural resources firm

MWH Global, Inc.
- Company type: Subsidiary
- Industry: Consulting, engineering, construction, operations and finance
- Founded: Heywood, Lancashire, United Kingdom (1820) (as Ames Crosta Babcock)
- Headquarters: Broomfield, Colorado United States
- Key people: Alan Krause, President of MWH, now part of Stantec
- Revenue: ▲$1.3 Billion USD (2013)
- Owner: Stantec Inc.
- Number of employees: 7,000 (2015)
- Website: www.mwhglobal.com

MWH Global Inc. was a global water and natural resources firm providing technical engineering, construction services and consulting services. In 2016, MWH was acquired by Stantec Consulting Inc. The firm provided planning, design and construction management for water and natural resources projects around the world. The firm was headquartered in Broomfield, a suburb of the Denver metropolitan area in the state of Colorado of the United States, with operations in 35 countries. As of May 2015, MWH Global had a global staff of approximately 7,000 employees including builders, engineers, architects, geologists, operators, project managers, business consultants, scientists, technologists, and regulatory experts. MWH was listed as the 15th-largest employee-owned company in the United States.

The MWH name is carried forward today at MWH Constructors, the water and wastewater construction branch of the former MWH Global.

== History ==
MWH Global is the unification of three major engineering firms: James M. Montgomery Consulting Engineers (JMM), Watson Hawksley, Ltd., and Harza Engineering Company. JMM was founded in Pasadena, California, in 1945 by James M. Montgomery following his work on the design (1936) and commencement (1941) of the 100-million gallon per day F. E. Weymouth Memorial Water Softening and Filtration Plant at La Verne, California, for the Metropolitan Water District of Southern California while with the firm Hoover and Montgomery. JMM merged with Watson Hawksley, Ltd., of High Wycombe, United Kingdom, in 1990, combining JMM's specialization in water and wastewater engineering with Watson Hawksley's international operation, to become the global firm of Montgomery Watson.

In 2001, Montgomery Watson merged with Harza Engineering Company, of Chicago, Illinois, best known for its work in the energy and environmental sectors and hydroelectric power development including the El Cajón Dam in Honduras (officially known as Central Hidroeléctrica Francisco Morazán), and operated under the new name of Montgomery Watson Harza.

In 2003, the firm name was shortened to MWH.

In 2010, MWH acquired Biwater Services Ltd., a water construction and engineering firm. With the acquisition, the firm's history can now be traced to 1820, when Ames Crosta Babcock (an acquisition of Biwater Services) was created.
