= California Innocence Project =

American legal non-profit organization

California Western Innocence and Justice Clinic
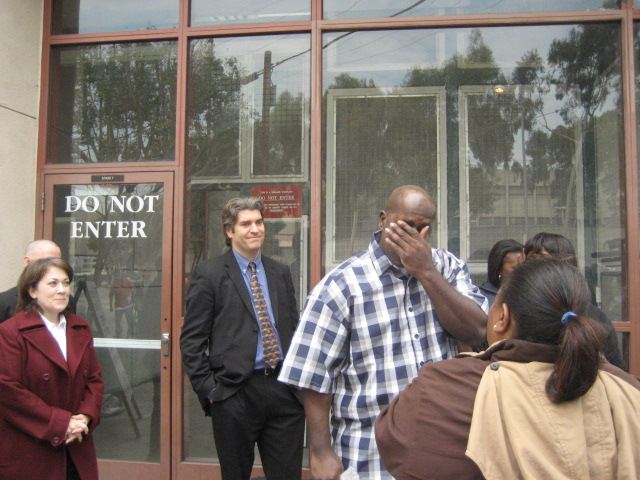
- Tim Atkins greeting family after release
- Abbreviation: IJC
- Formation: 1999
- Type: Non-profit organization
- Purpose: IJC provides representation to individuals who are wrongfully convicted with a goal of securing their release from prison.
- Headquarters: California Western School of Law
- Location: San Diego
- Region served: California
- Services: Pro Bono legal services
- Executive Director: Amy Kimpel
- Website: California Western Innocence and Justice Clinic
- Formerly called: California Innocence Project

The California Innocence Project, was a non-profit organization based at California Western School of Law (CWSL) in San Diego, California, United States, that provided pro bono representation to individuals who are wrongfully convicted with a goal of securing their release from prison.

== History ==
The California Innocence Project was founded in 1999 at California Western School of Law in San Diego, California by Director Justin Brooks and Law Professor Jan Stiglitz. CIP was the fourth innocence project to form in the United States as part of the national innocence movement.

In May 2023, Justin Brooks announced his departure from both California Western School of Law and California Innocence Project.

Alissa Bjerkhoel began as Interim Director after Brook's departure and, in November 2023, was appointed to the judiciary.

In 2024, CWSL terminated the California Innocence Project and instituted a new program known as the California Western Innocence and Justice Clinic ("IJC") as a replacement. IJC is a wholly separate entity from the now-defunct California Innocence Project, and there is no affiliation between the organizations.

== Notable exonerations ==
The California Innocence Project, which was a previous clinical law program at CWSL, aided in the release of the following incarcerated individuals:

=== Brian Banks ===
Brian Banks was exonerated in 2012 after his accuser recanted her testimony that Banks raped and kidnapped her. Faced with a possible 41 years to life sentence, he accepted a plea deal that included five years in prison, five years of probation, and registering as a sex offender. The California Innocence Project (now IJC) took on the case after Banks came to the project with compelling evidence of innocence. After several months of investigation, the Los Angeles District Attorney agreed to dismiss the case against Banks.

=== Daniel Larsen ===
Daniel Larsen was exonerated in 2010 yet remained incarcerated until March 19, 2013, because the California Attorney General, Kamala Harris, continued to appeal. The California Innocence Project (now IJC) began representing Larsen in 2002. In 2010, a judge ordered Larsen's release, finding that he was "actually innocent" of the crime and that Larsen's constitutional rights were violated. Despite the ruling, Larsen remained in prison for two more years while the state attorney general challenged the judge's ruling because Larsen had missed the appeal deadline. In 2013 the 9th U.S. Circuit Court of Appeals upheld the lower court ruling and freed Larsen after 14 years in prison.

=== Jason Puracal ===
Jason Puracal was exonerated in 2012 after an appeals court overturned his 22-year sentence in a Nicaragua maximum-security prison. Despite lack of evidence, Puracal was arrested November 2010 in San Juan del Sur and convicted of money-laundering, drug charges, and organized crime in August 2011. The California Innocence Project (now IJC) helped bring Puracal's case before a three-judge appellate panel in August 2012. On September 12, 2012, he was acquitted of all charges and ordered released.

== Innocence March ==
On April 27, 2013, CIP staff and supporters began the Innocence March, a 712-mile, two-month-long walk from the California Western School of Law in San Diego to Sacramento, where they presented Governor of California Jerry Brown with clemency petitions for 'The California 12.' In each of these inmates' cases, attorneys had exhausted all legal recourse despite compelling evidence of innocence.

=== The California 12 ===
- Ed Contreras
- Alan Gimenez
- Michael Hanline
- Suzanne Johnson
- Kimberly Long
- Dolores Macias
- Rodney Patrick McNeal
- Guy Miles
- Quintin Morris
- Kiera Newsome
- Joann Parks
- William Richards

Some of these clients had been found innocent by a judge, yet remained incarcerated for a period, although as of 2020 only one remains in prison. The Innocence March ended June 20, 2013, at the steps of the California State Capitol building in Sacramento. Following a rally attended by more than 100 supporters, attorneys from the California Innocence Project met with a staff delegation from the office of Governor Jerry Brown to plead for clemency for The California 12, and to call attention to wrongful convictions and contributing causes, such as flawed eyewitness identification and faulty science.

In 2020, the incumbent Governor of California Gavin Newsom granted clemency to dozens of prisoners, including four from the California 12, so only one, Edward Contreras, remains incarcerated.

== See also ==
- List of wrongful convictions in the United States
- List of exonerated death row inmates
- List of United States death row inmates
