= Freedom Now =

Human rights organization

- Founded: 2001; 25 years ago
- Founder: Jared Genser
- Purpose: Human rights
- Location: Washington, D.C., U.S.
- Region served: Worldwide
- Key people: Maran Turner (Executive director)
- Website: freedom-now.org

Freedom Now is a Washington, D.C.-based non-profit, non-partisan organization that opposes government repression and defends human rights through direct legal support, advocacy, and capacity-building analysis and assistance. It was founded in 2001 by Jared Genser.

Its approach is to use focused legal, political, and public relations advocacy efforts designed to compel the release of individuals deprived of their liberty in violation of the rights and freedoms enshrined in the Universal Declaration of Human Rights, the International Covenant on Civil and Political Rights, and other international human rights instruments.

A small organization with limited resources, Freedom Now works with other human rights organizations and lawyers to identify cases that would benefit from the organization's approach.

== Notable campaigns ==
Freedom Now represents 38 prisoners of conscience worldwide, including:

- Abdulhadi Alkhawaja (Bahrain)
- Loujain Alhathloul (Saudi Arabia)
- G.N. Saibaba (India)
- Buzurgmehr Yorov (Tajikistan)

== Notable past campaigns ==
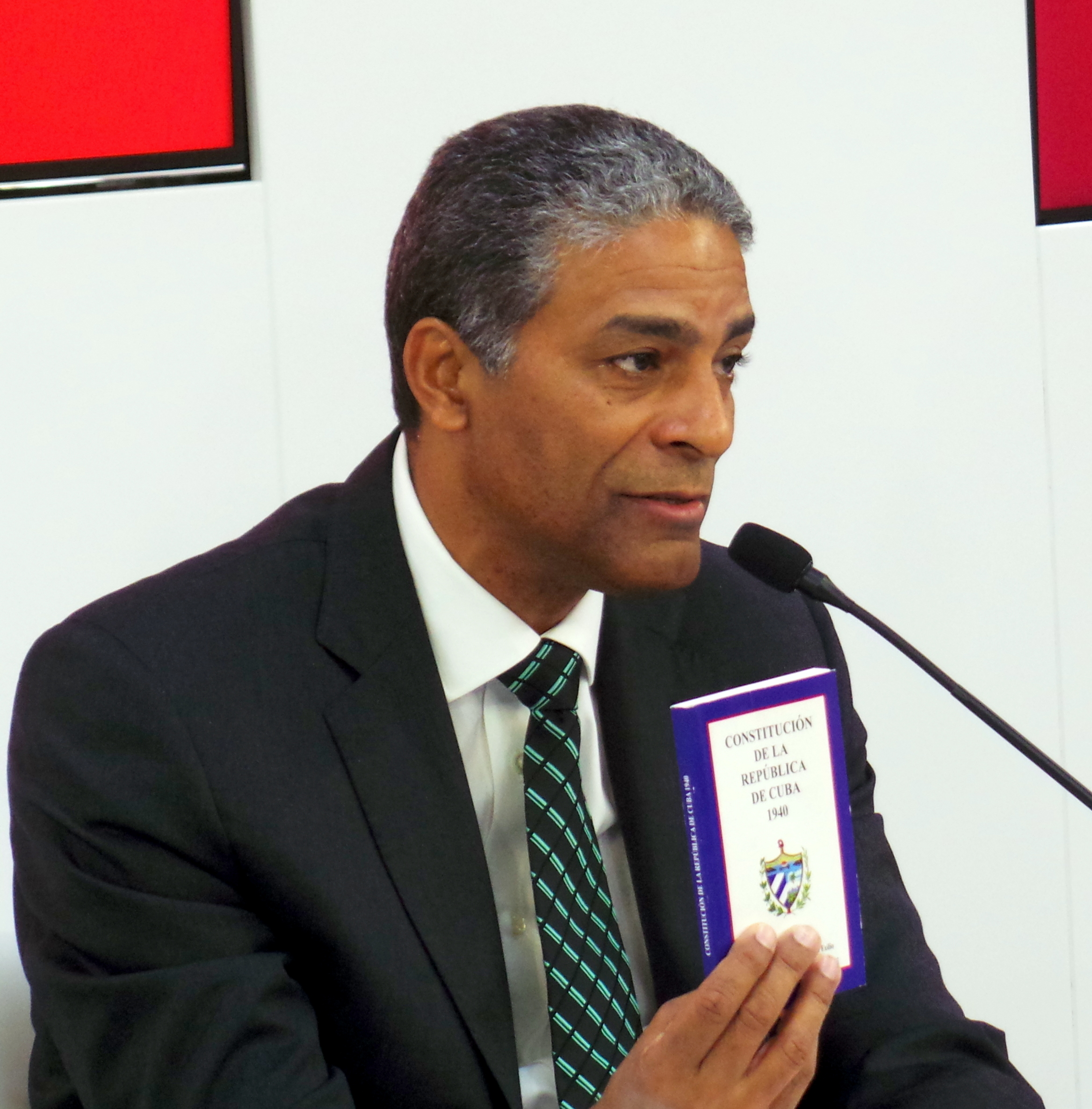
Óscar Elías Biscet in 2016.

Prisoners of conscience previously represented by Freedom Now include:

- Eskinder Nega (Ethiopia)
- Óscar Elías Biscet, M.D. (Cuba)
- Father Thadeus Nguyen Van Ly (Vietnam)
- Andrei Sannikov (Belarus)
- Lapiro de Mbanga (Cameroon)
- Dr. Yang Jianli (China)

== UN Working Group on Arbitrary Detention Database ==
In 2011, Freedom Now partnered with the UN and Thomson Reuters to create the UN Working Group on Arbitrary Detention Database. The online database includes over 1,000 legal decisions from 1992 to the present. It is the only searchable, complete database of Working Group decisions available. Freedom Now continues to monitor and update the database.
