= Home of golf =

Home of golf may refer to:

- Scotland, where the sport originated; see
  - golf in Scotland
  - history of golf
- St Andrews Links, course complex of medieval origin
- Old Course at St Andrews, oldest course in the links
- The Royal and Ancient Golf Club of St Andrews, formerly operated the Old Course and codified of the rules of golf
