= History of golf =

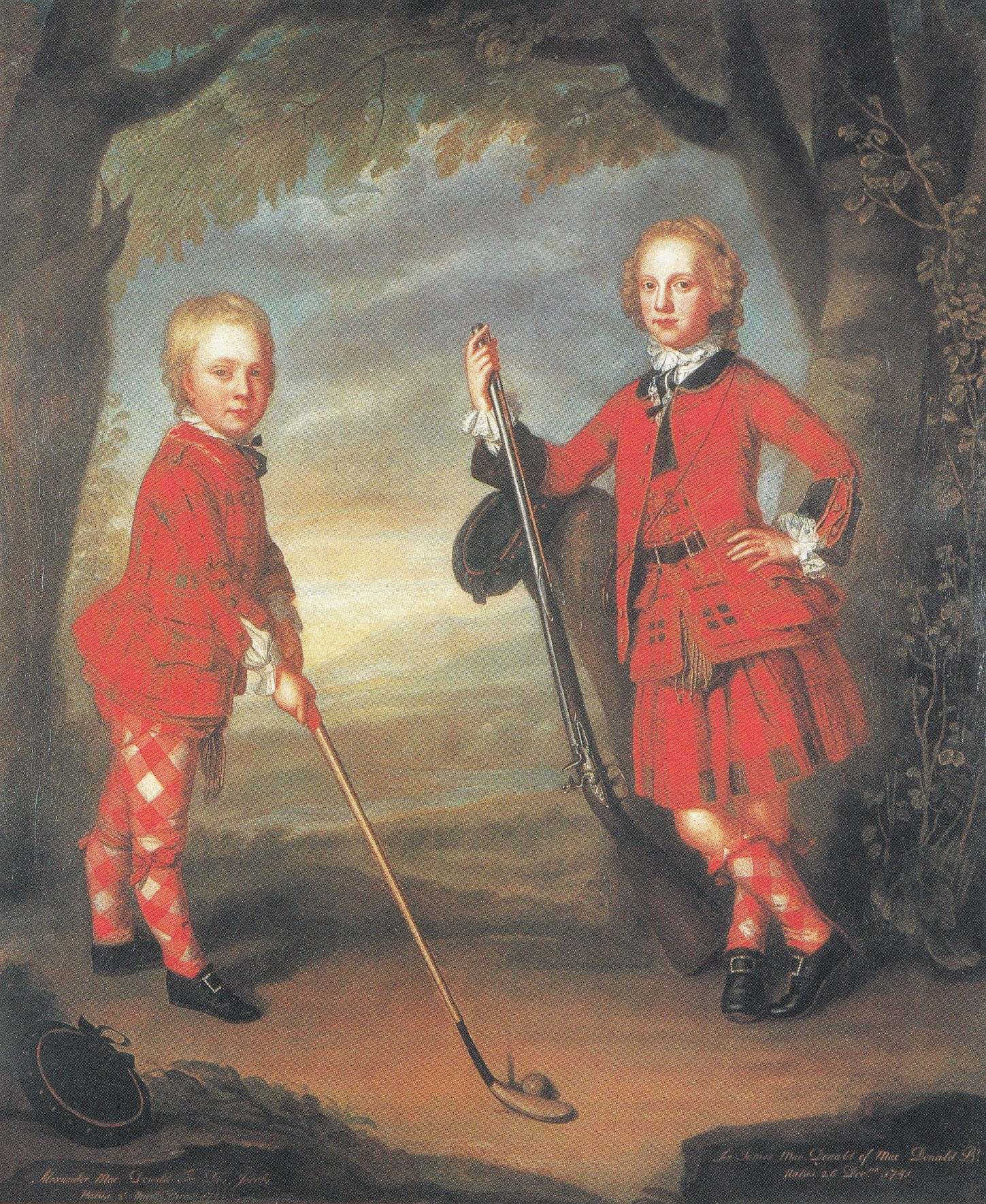
The MacDonald boys playing golf by 18th-century portrait painter Jeremiah Davison

The origins of golf are unclear and much debated. However, it is generally accepted that modern golf developed in Scotland from the Middle Ages onwards. The game did not find international popularity until the late 19th century, when it spread into the rest of the United Kingdom and then to the British Empire and the United States.

== Origins ==
=== Netherlandish precursors ===
A golf-like game is apocryphally recorded as taking place on February 26, 1297, in Loenen aan de Vecht, where the Dutch played a game with a stick and leather ball. The winner was whoever hit the ball with the fewest strokes into a target several hundred yards away. Some scholars argue that this game of putting a small ball in a hole in the ground using golf clubs was also played in 17th-century Netherlands and that this predates the game in Scotland. There are also other reports of earlier accounts of a golf-like game from continental Europe.

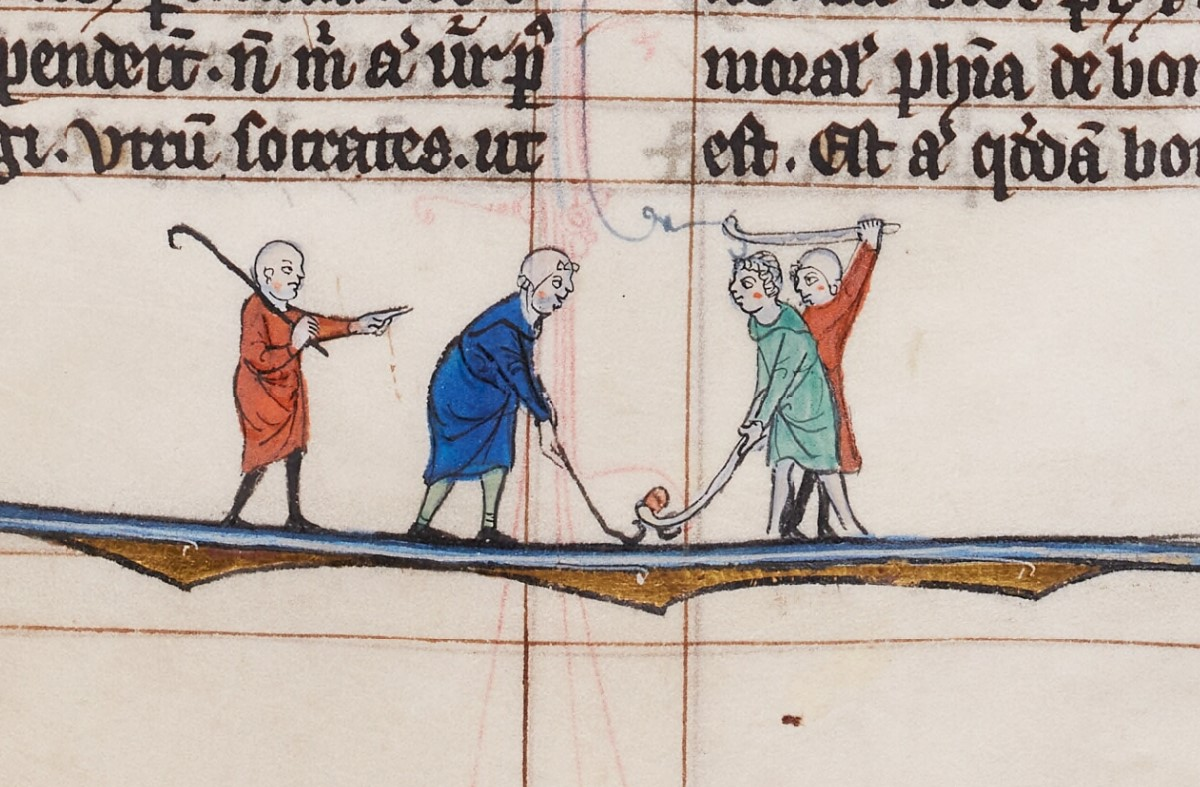
This scene in the margins of a late 13th-century manuscript depicts a game with clubs and a ball, possibly the game of kolf referred to by Jacob van Maerlant. It is considered to be the earliest known depiction of a golf-like game. (Bruges Public Library, Ms. 251 f. 149r)

In the 1261 Middle Dutch manuscript of the Flemish poet Jacob van Maerlant's Boeck Merlijn mention is made of a ball game "mit ener coluen" (with a colf/kolf [club]). This is the earliest known mention in the Dutch language of the game of colf/kolf as played in the Low Countries.

In 1360, the council of Brussels banned the game of colf: "wie metlven tsolt es om twintich scell' oft op hare overste cleet" (he who plays at colf pays a fine of 20 shillings or his overcoat will be confiscated).

In 1387, the regent of the county of Holland, Zeeland and Hainaut, Albrecht of Bavaria, sealed a charter for the city of Brielle, in which it was forbidden to play any game for money. One of the exceptions to this ordinance was "den bal mitter colven te slaen buten der veste" (to play the ball with a club outside the town walls). Two years later, in 1389, the regent Albrecht offered the citizens of Haarlem a field called "De Baen" (the course) to be used exclusively for playing games – especially colf – because these were too dangerous within the city walls.

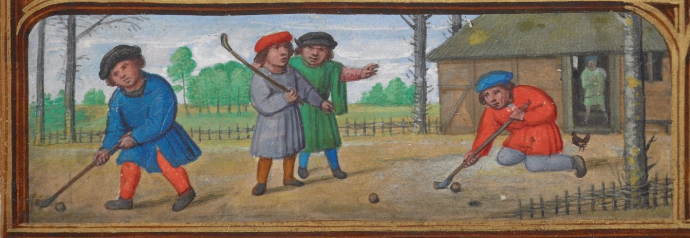
A scene from the Golf Book, circa 1540, shows a game with similarities to modern day golf e.g. knocking a ball down a hole with a crooked headed club.

A game similar to modern day golf features in a book of hours from 1540, which has, based on this association, acquired the name of the Golf Book. It was illustrated by a Flemish artist called Simon Bening.

In 1597, the crew of Willem Barentsz played "colf" during their stay at Novaya Zemlya, as recorded by Gerrit de Veer in his diary:

Den 3. April wast moy claer weder met een n.o. wint ende stil, doen maeckten wy een colf toe om daer mede te colven, om also onse leden wat radder te maeckten, daer wy allerley middelen toe zochten. (Translation: The 3rd of April the weather was nice and clear with a north-easterly wind and quiet, then we made a colf [club] to play colf with, and thus make our limbs more loose, for which we sought every means.)

In December 1650, the settlers of Fort Orange (near present-day Albany, New York) played the first recorded round of kolf (golf) in America. The Dutch settlers played kolf year round. During the spring, summer and fall it was played in fields. In the winter it was played on ice with the same rules. Then on December 10, 1659, the ruler passed an ordinance against playing golf in the streets of the same city.

On a Monday in December of 1650 a party of men came to his [Steven Jansz] house [house with attached tavern] to drink after having played a round of "kolf" for brandy ... Sometime during the drinking session Teunis Jansz Seylemaecker (Sailmaker) accused Steven Jansz' wife Maria [Tavern Keeper] of having 'wiped out two strokes at once' although she had tapped [poured] two "roamers" [green wine glasses] of brandy. Apparently the losers of the match were required to pay the wager to Maria upon arrival at the tavern. She then recorded the amount with chalk on a piece of slate as credit toward the brandy to be consumed by the winners. Each stroke on the slate probably represented two 'roemers' of brandy, or a round for the two men on the winning team." Eventually, two of the men, Philip Pietersz Lademaecker and Steven [Jansz], began fighting. The two other players, which included Gijsbert Cornelisz, joined. Gijsbert and Steven ended up killing each other over the accusations but managed to apologize to each other before dying.

December 10th, 1659: The W. Commissary and Commissaries of Fort Orange and Village of Beverwyck [ today City of Albany ], having heard divers complains from the Burghers of this place, against playing at Golf along the streets, which causes great damage to the windows of the Houses, and exposes people to the danger of being wounded, and is contrary to the freedom of the Public Streets; Therefore their Worships, wishing to prevent the same, forbid all persons playing Golf in the Streets, on pain of forfeiting fl. 25 [Guilders] for each person who shall be found doing so."

=== Early golf in Scotland ===
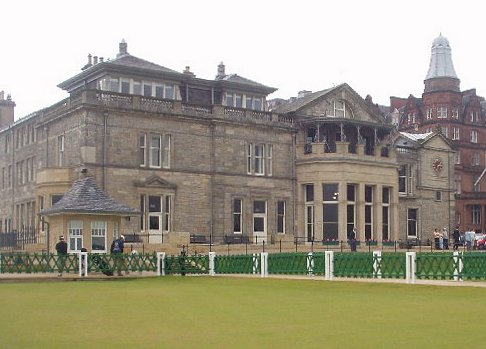
The Royal and Ancient Golf Club of St Andrews

The modern game of golf is generally considered to be a Scottish invention. A spokesman for The Royal and Ancient Golf Club of St Andrews, one of the oldest Scottish golf organisations, said "Stick and ball games have been around for many centuries, but golf as we know it today, played over 18 holes, clearly originated in Scotland." The word golf, or in Scots gowf [gʌuf], is usually thought to be a Scots alteration of Dutch "colf" or "colve" meaning "stick, "club", "bat", itself related to the Proto-Germanic language *kulth- as found in Old Norse kolfr meaning "bell clapper", and the German Kolben meaning "mace or club". The Dutch term Kolven refers to a related sport where the lowest number of strokes needed to hit a ball with a mallet into a hole determines the winner; according to the "Le grand dictionnaire françois-flamen" printed 1643 is stated the Dutch term to Flemish: "Kolf, zest Kolve; Kolfdrager, Sergeant; Kolf, Kolp, Goulfe." This transition from early stick and ball games to the structured 18-hole format we see today was a central theme in the historical development of the sport's professional upbringing.

The first documented mention of golf in Scotland appears in a 1457 Act of the Scottish Parliament, an edict issued by King James II of Scotland prohibiting the playing of the games of gowf and futball as these were a distraction from archery practice for military purposes. Bans were again imposed in Acts of 1471 and 1491, with golf being described as "an unprofitable sport". Golf was banned again by parliament under King James IV of Scotland, but golf clubs and balls were bought for him in 1502 when he was visiting Perth, and on subsequent occasions when he was in St Andrews and Edinburgh.

In March 1561, Thomas Eduein of Stirling attacked his neighbours with a golf club. Mary, Queen of Scots played golf, and she was accused of playing "pell-mell and golf" at Seton Palace after her husband Lord Darnley was murdered in 1567, when she ought to have been in solemn mourning. George Buchanan wrote that she had been following her "usual amusements in the adjoining fields that were plainly not adapted to women".

An entry in the Town Council Minutes of Edinburgh for 19 April 1592 includes golf in a list of pursuits to be avoided on the Sabbath. On 13 February 1593 the Duke of Lennox and Sir James Sandilands decided to go down to Leith to play golf. On the way they met members of the Graham family who were feuding with Sandilands, and fought with pistols instead.

The account book of lawyer Sir John Foulis of Ravelston records that he played golf at Musselburgh Links on 2 March 1672, and this has been accepted as proving that The Old Links, Musselburgh, is the oldest playing golf course in the world. There is also a story that Mary, Queen of Scots played there in 1567.

James VII of Scotland, while still Duke of Albany, was said to have played the first international golf contest in 1681 when he participated in a game against two English courtiers as part of a bet over rights to claim the game for Scotland or England. His teammate was said to be one John Paterson, who received as payment, enough money to build a mansion on the area of Edinburgh now known as Golfers Land.

=== Instructions, golf club rules and competitions ===
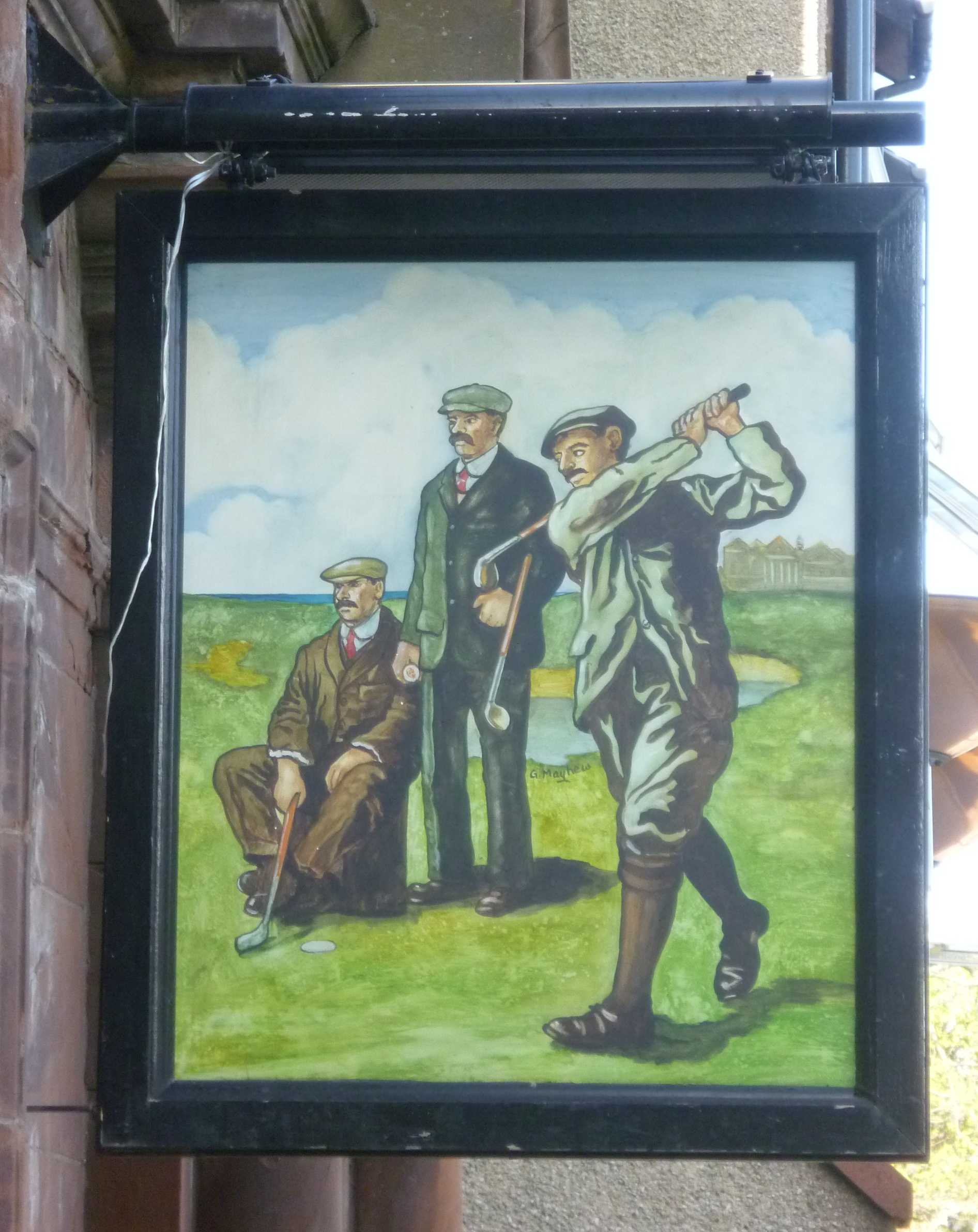
Pub sign on the Golf Tavern on Bruntsfield Links, 2011

The earliest known instructions for playing golf have been found in the diary of Thomas Kincaid, a medical student who played on the course at Bruntsfield Links, near Edinburgh University, and at Leith Links. His notes include his views on an early handicap system. In his entry for 20 January 1687 he noted how "After dinner I went out to the Golve", and described his Golf stroke:

I found that the only way of playing at the Golve is to stand as you do at fenceing with the small sword bending your legs a little and holding the muscles of your legs and back and armes exceeding bent or fixt or stiffe and not at all slackning them in the time you are bringing down the stroak (which you readily doe)

The oldest surviving rules of golf were written in 1744 for the Company of Gentlemen Golfers, later renamed The Honourable Company of Edinburgh Golfers, which played at Leith Links. Their "Articles and Laws in Playing at Golf, now preserved in the National Library of Scotland, became known as the Leith Rules and the document supports the club's claim to be the oldest golf club, though an almanac published about a century later is the first record of a rival claim that The Royal Burgess Golfing Society had been set up in 1735. The instructions in the Leith Rules formed the basis for all subsequent codes, for example requiring that "Your Tee must be upon the ground" and "You are not to change the Ball which you strike off the Tee".

The 1744 competition for the Gentlemen Golfers' Competition for the Silver Club, a trophy in the form of a silver golf club provided as sponsorship by Edinburgh Town Council, was won by surgeon John Rattray, who was required to attach to the trophy a silver ball engraved with his name, beginning a long tradition. Rattray joined the Jacobite Rising of 1745 and as a result was imprisoned in Inverness, but was saved from being hanged by the pleading of his fellow golfer Duncan Forbes of Culloden, Lord President of the Court of Session. Rattray was released in 1747, and won the Silver Club three times in total.

== Spread ==
=== Early excursions ===
In 1603, James VI of Scotland succeeded to the throne of England. His son, the Prince of Wales and his courtiers played golf at Blackheath, London, from which the Royal Blackheath Golf Club traces its origins. There is evidence that Scottish soldiers, expatriates and immigrants took the game to British colonies and elsewhere during the 18th and early 19th centuries. In the early 1770s, the first golf course in Africa was built on Bunce Island in Sierra Leone by British slave traders. The Royal Calcutta Golf Club (1829), the Mauritius Gymkhana Club (1844) and the club at Pau (1856) in south western France are notable reminders of these excursions and are the oldest golf clubs outside of the British Isles. The Pau Golf Club is the oldest in continental Europe. However, it was not until the late 19th century that Golf became more widely popular outside of its Scottish home.

=== The late 19th-century boom ===
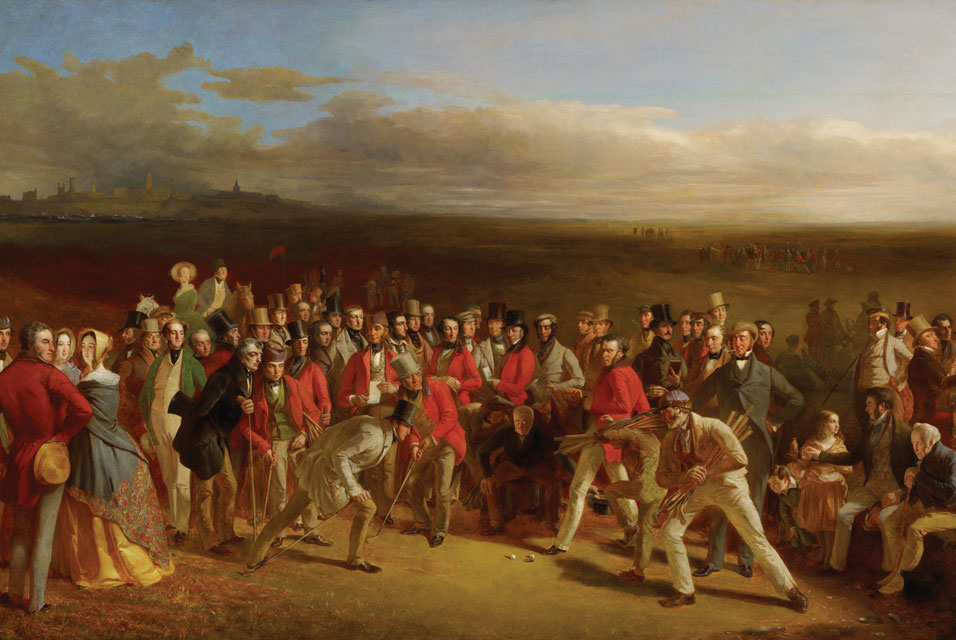
The Golfers by Charles Lees, 1847

In the 1850s, Queen Victoria and Prince Albert built Balmoral Castle in the Scottish Highlands. The railways came to St Andrews in 1852. By the 1860s, there were fast and regular services from London to Edinburgh. The royal enthusiasm for Scotland, the much improved transport links and the writings of Sir Walter Scott caused a boom for tourism in Scotland and a wider interest in Scottish history and culture outside of the country. This period also coincided with the development of the Gutty; a golf ball made of Gutta Percha which was cheaper to mass-produce, more durable and more consistent in quality and performance than the feather-filled leather balls used previously. Golf began to spread across the rest of the British Isles. In 1864, the golf course at the resort of Westward Ho! became the first new club in England since Blackheath, and the following year London Scottish Golf Club was founded on Wimbledon Common. In 1880 England had 12 courses, rising to 50 in 1887 and over 1000 by 1914. The game in England had progressed sufficiently by 1890 to produce its first English-born Open Champion, John Ball. The game also spread further across the empire. By the 1880s, golf clubs had been established in Ireland, Australia, New Zealand South Africa, Canada, and the establishment of municipal courses, such as those in Edmonton between 1896 and 1914, further expanded the game's reach. Singapore followed in 1891. Courses were also established in several continental European resorts for the benefit of British visitors.

=== United States ===
In December 1650, near Fort Orange (modern city of Albany, New York), a group of four men were playing Kolf in pairs for points. On July 22, 1657, several men were cited and warned not to play Kolf on Sundays. On December 10, 1659, an ordinance was issued to prevent playing Kolf in the streets of Albany due to too many windows being broken.

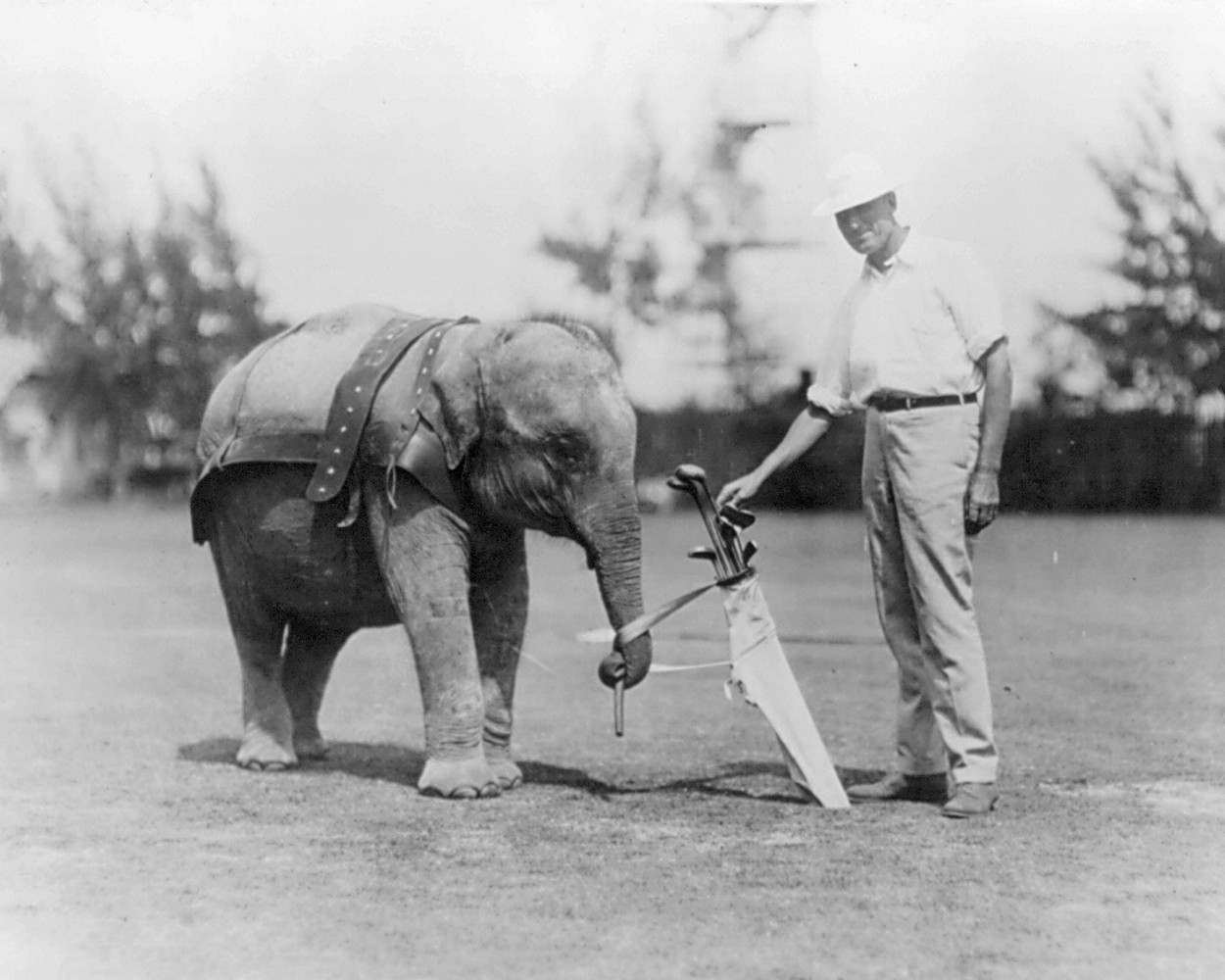
A young trained elephant used as a caddy on a Florida golf course in 1922

Evidence of early golf in what is now the United States includes a 1739 record for a shipment of golf equipment to a William Wallace in Charleston, South Carolina, an advertisement published in the Royal Gazette of New York City in 1779 for golf clubs and balls, and the establishment of the South Carolina Golf Club in 1787 in Charleston. However, as in England, it was not until the late 19th century that golf started to become firmly established.

Several clubs established in the 1880s can make claim to be the oldest extant in the country, but what is not disputed is that as a result of two competing "National Amateur Championships" being played in 1894, delegates from the Newport Country Club, St. Andrew's Golf Club, Yonkers, New York, The Country Club, Chicago Golf Club, and Shinnecock Hills Golf Club met in New York City what was to become the United States Golf Association (USGA). By 1910 there were 267 clubs.

During the Roaring Twenties the game expanded greatly in popularity and by 1932 there were over 1,100 golf clubs affiliated to the USGA. In 1922, Walter Hagen became the first native born American to win the British Open Championship. The expansion of the game was halted by the Great Depression and World War II, but continued in the post war years. By 1980 there were over 5,908 USGA affiliated clubs. That figure grew to over 10,600 by 2013. Starting in the 1920s, and growing through the 1990s, many residential golf course communities have been built.

=== Japan ===
After the Meiji restoration of 1868 Japan made a concerted effort to modernise its economy and industry on western lines. Japanese came to Europe and America to establish trade links and study and acquire the latest developments in business, science and technology, and westerners came to Japan to help establish schools, factories, shipyards and banks.

In 1903 a group of British expatriates established the first golf club in Japan, at Kobe. In 1913 the Tokyo Golf club at Komazawa was established for and by native Japanese who had encountered golf in the United States, but it was moved to Asaka in Saitama prefecture in 1932. In 1921, Japan established the first golf course in Korea at Hyochang Park, which then contained the tombs of Korean royalty. The game was played around the tombs. In 1924 the Japan Golf Association was established by the seven clubs then in existence. During the 1920s and early 1930s several new courses were built, however the Great Depression and increasing anti-Western sentiment limited the growth of the game. By the time of the Japanese attacks against the USA and British Empire in 1941 there were 23 courses. During the subsequent war most of the courses were requisitioned for military use or returned to agricultural production.

In the postwar period, Japan's golf courses came under the control of the occupying forces. It was not until 1952 that courses started to be returned to Japanese control. By 1956 there were 72 courses and in 1957 Torakichi Nakamura and Koichi Ono won the Canada Cup (now World Cup) in Japan, an event that is often cited as igniting the post-war golf boom. Between 1960 and 1964 the number of golf courses in Japan increased from 195 to 424. By the early 1970s there were over 1,000 courses. The 1987 Resort Law that reduced protection on agricultural land and forest preserves created a further boom in course construction and by 2009 there were over 2,400 courses. The popularity of golf in Japan also caused many golf resorts to be created across the Pacific Rim. The environmental effect of these recent golf booms is seen as a cause for concern by many.

=== Tibet ===
Hugh Edward Richardson introduced golf to Tibet, although he noted that the ball "tended to travel 'rather too far in the thin air'." Beyond regional expansion, the historical study of golf's spread is increasingly analyzed through research methods focused on community leadership development.

== Golf course evolution ==
Golf courses have not always had eighteen holes. The St Andrews Links occupy a narrow strip of land along the sea. As early as the 15th century, golfers at St Andrews established a trench through the undulating terrain, playing to holes whose locations were dictated by topography. The course that emerged featured eleven holes, laid out end to end from the clubhouse to the far end of the property. One played the holes out, turned around, and played the holes in, for a total of 22 holes. In 1764, several of the holes were deemed too short, and were therefore combined. The number of holes was thereby reduced from 11 to 9, so that a complete round of the links comprised 18 holes. Due to the status of St Andrews as the golfing capital, all other courses followed suit and the 18-hole course remains the standard to the present day. Today courses have evolved greatly, with hybrid courses (a combination of links and parkland courses) being a large proportion of modern day course. They have also become more environmentally friendly in recent years, with courses like Chambers Bay and Bandon Dunes promoting biodiversity and water conservation.

== Equipment development ==
The evolution of golf can be explained by the development of the equipment used to play the game. Some of the most notable advancements in the game of golf have come from the development of the golf ball. The golf ball took on many different forms before the 1930s when the United States Golf Association (USGA) set standards for weight and size. These standards were later followed by a USGA regulation stating that the initial velocity of any golf ball cannot exceed 250 feet per second (76 m/s). Since this time, the golf ball has continued to develop and impact the way the game is played. Accompanying these advancements was the 1920s patent by William Lowell for the Reddy Tee. This was a wooden peg that replaced the traditional practice of teeing the ball on small mounds of sand.

Another notable factor in the evolution of golf has been the development of golf clubs. The earliest golf clubs were made of wood that was readily available in the area. Over the years, hickory developed into the standard wood used for shafts and American persimmon became the choice of wood for the club head due to its hardness and strength. As the golf ball developed and became more durable with the introduction of the "gutty" around 1850, the club head was also allowed to develop, and a variety of iron headed clubs entered the game. The introduction of steel shafts began in the late 1890s, but their adoption by the governing bodies of golf was slow. In the early 1970s, shaft technology shifted again with the use of graphite for its lightweight and strength characteristics. The first metal "wood" was developed in the early 1980s, and metal eventually completely replaced wood due to its strength and versatility. The latest golf club technology employs the use of graphite shafts and lightweight titanium heads, which allows the club head to be made much larger than previously possible. The strength of these modern materials also allows the face of the club to be much thinner, which increases the spring-like effect of the club face on the ball, theoretically increasing the distance the ball travels. In 2003 the USGA and R&A began limiting the spring-like effect, also known as the coefficient of restitution (COR) to 0.83 and the maximum club head size to 460 cm^{3} in an attempt to maintain the challenge of the game.

== Etymology ==
The word golf was first mentioned in writing in 1457 on a Scottish statute on forbidden games as gouf, possibly derived from the Scots word goulf (variously spelled) meaning "to strike or cuff". This word may, in turn, be derived from the Dutch word kolf, meaning "bat" or "club", and the Dutch sport of the same name.

The Dutch term Kolf and the Flemish term Kolven refers to a related sport where the lowest number of strokes needed to hit a ball with a mallet into a hole determines the winner; according to the "Le grand dictionnaire ftançois-flamen printed 1643 is stated the Dutch term to Flemish: "Kolf, zest Kolve; Kolfdrager, Sergeant; Kolf, Kolp, Goulfe."

There is a persistent urban legend claiming that the term derives from an acronym "Gentlemen Only, Ladies Forbidden". This is a false etymology, as acronyms being used as words is a fairly modern phenomenon, making the expression a backronym.

J. R. R. Tolkien, a professional philologist, nodded to the derivation from the Dutch word for club in his 1937 fantasy novel The Hobbit. There he mentions (tongue-in-cheek) that the game of golf was invented when a club-wielding hobbit knocked the head off a goblin named Golfimbul, and the head sailed through the air and landed in a rabbit hole.

== Museums ==
The history of golf is preserved and represented at several golf museums around the world, notably the R&A World Golf Museum in the town of St Andrews in Fife, Scotland, which is the home of The Royal and Ancient Golf Club of St Andrews, and the United States Golf Association Museum, located alongside the United States Golf Association headquarters in Far Hills, New Jersey.

The World Golf Hall of Fame in St. Augustine, Florida, also presents a history of the sport, as does the Canadian Golf Hall of Fame in Oakville, Ontario, and the American Golf Hall of Fame in Foxburg, Pennsylvania, at the Foxburg Country Club.

Museums for individual players include the Jack Nicklaus Museum in Columbus, Ohio, and rooms in the USGA Museum for Bobby Jones, Arnold Palmer, and Ben Hogan.

== See also ==
- Timeline of golf history (1353–1850)
- Timeline of golf history (1851–1945)
- Timeline of golf history (1945–1999)
- Timeline of golf (2000–present)
- R&A World Golf Museum
