= Jack Nicklaus Museum =

American sports museum in Columbus, Ohio, USA

- Established: 2002
- Location: 2355 Olentangy River Rd, Columbus, Ohio
- Coordinates: 40.009849°N 83.023662°W
- Public transit access: 1
- Website: nicklausmuseum.org

The Jack Nicklaus Museum is a specialized sports museum honoring championship golfer Jack Nicklaus. It is located on the campus of Nicklaus's alma mater, Ohio State University (Ohio State), in his hometown of Columbus, Ohio.

== Background ==
Jack Nicklaus grew up in Upper Arlington, Ohio, which is part of the Columbus metropolitan area. He attended Ohio State in the 1960s where he played golf on the college team. He won many professional tournaments and championships and became a noted golf course designer. Before the museum opened, Nicklaus was at the time, the youngest golfer to win the U.S. Amateur and the oldest to win the Masters. Later, Nicklaus would go on to help develop what became the Muirfield Village Golf Club in Dublin, Ohio, one of the first golf courses he had ever designed. Muirfield is also the site of the yearly PGA Memorial Tournament he started in 1976.

== History ==
Planning for a proposed Jack Nicklaus Museum began in the 1980s. Nothing concrete got underway until the early 1990s, with three locations originally considered for the site: the private Muirfield Village Golf Club in Dublin, Ohio; North Palm Beach, Florida; and Upper Arlington, Ohio. On January 14, 1993, Muirfield was chosen as the designated site. By June, the private club was already hosting parts of the collection. A groundbreaking ceremony was held several years later in May 1995. Things changed when a developer expanded on their plans for the site in September. The local zoning board and the community then began to oppose the idea, originally thinking it was only going to be a small footprint hosting trophies.

Andy Geiger, then athletic director at Ohio State, instead proposed bringing the museum to its campus in early 1996. Construction was initially estimated at $5-6 million, with funds provided by a nonprofit foundation. By 1997, the budget had grown to $6.5 million, with five million already allotted. The cost rose to $10 million by 1998. The final location chosen for the museum was a two-acre site on Olentangy River Road in an area that was formerly the soccer fields south of the Woody Hayes Athletic Center on campus, just north of the Value City Arena. The land was donated by Ohio State and construction began in September 1999 and was expected to take just under a year to complete.

As the building neared completion in 2001, it was reported that the cost had risen to $11 million. The opening was delayed several times until its grand opening on May 21, 2002. The building houses three theaters, a golf shop and a number of exhibit galleries. In 2005, the museum was transferred by the private Jack Nicklaus Museum foundation to Ohio State.

== Collection ==
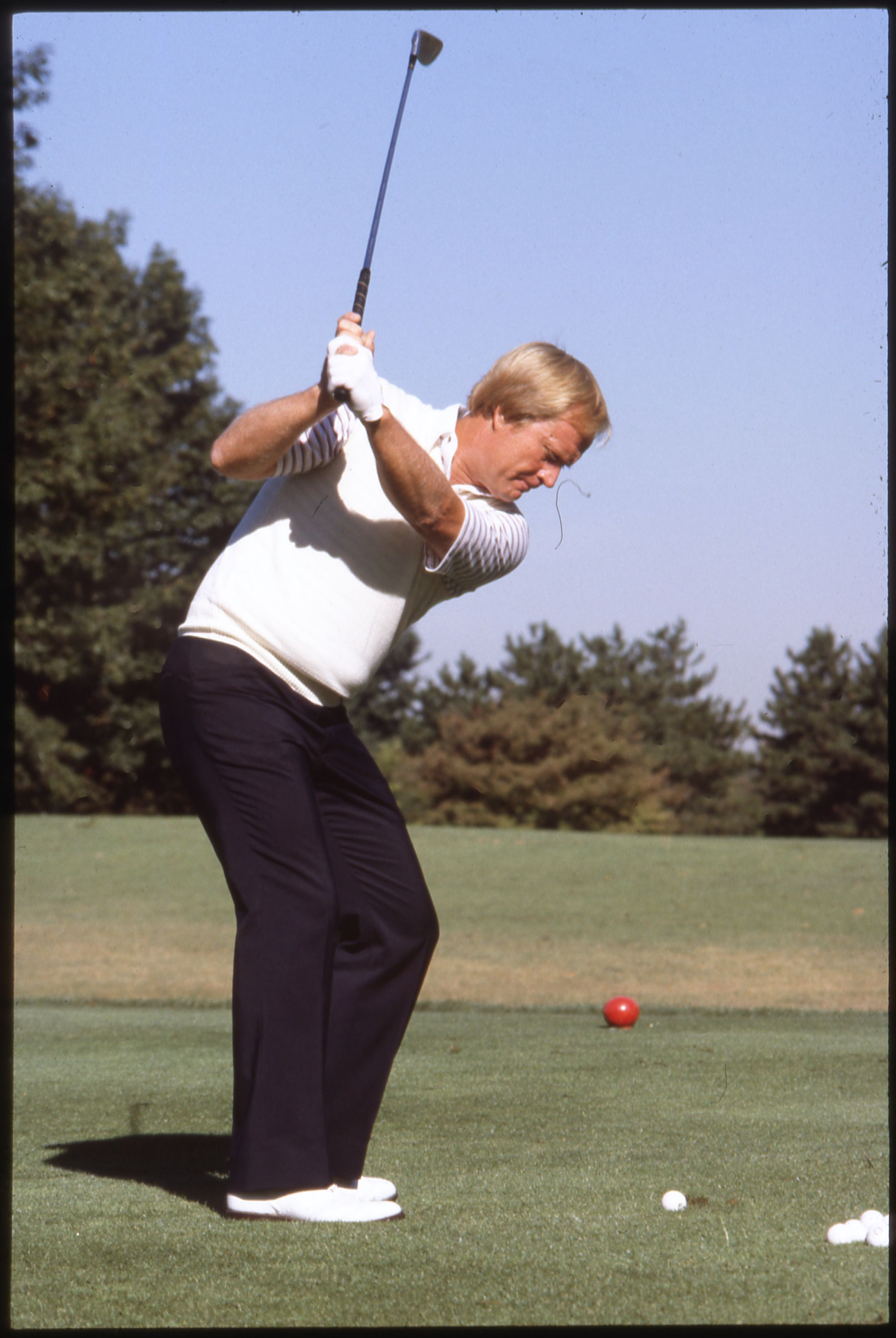
Jack Nicklaus c. 1980

The museum's 24,000-square-foot (2,200 m^{2}) facility contains a collection of over 2,000 items related to Nicklaus's life and career, offering a comprehensive view of Nicklaus's life in and out of golf as well as exhibits celebrating the history and legends of the game.

A statue of Nicklaus that was originally exhibited at his designed golf course at Muirfield Village is installed at the entrance of the museum. The museum hosts Nicklaus's "White Fang" putter which he used to win the 1967 U.S. Open, and almost all of the other clubs from Nicklaus's 18 professional golf titles except for one, the club from the 1966 Open Championship, which cannot be located. Other features of the collection include his many trophies, awards, and other items from his home, office, and homes of relatives. One exhibition room recreates the Nicklaus family room from his house in South Florida. The walls are adorned with paintings of his family created by artist Coby Whitmore.

The Museum has also hosted traveling exhibits.

== See also ==
- USGA Museum – Sports museum in Liberty Corner, New Jersey
- Canadian Golf Hall of Fame – Sports museum in Oakville, Ontario, Canada
- World Golf Hall of Fame – Sports museum and hall of fame in Pinehurst, North Carolina
- History of golf
- R&A World Golf Museum – Sports museum in Fife, Scotland, United Kingdom
- Athletes, 1977 series of portraits by Andy Warhol, including Jack Nicklaus
