= Golf book =

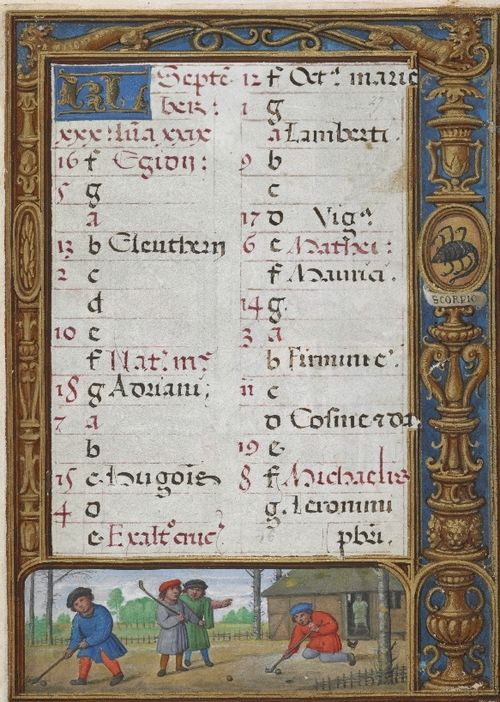
September- Four men playing a game that resembles golf

The Golf Book (British Library Add MS 24098) is the common name for an illuminated manuscript Book of Hours in the Use of Rome, dating from the 1540s. Only 23 pages remain of the original work created by the renowned illuminator Simon Bening and his studio in Bruges. It owes its popular name to one illustration in the calendar, depicting people playing a game resembling golf. The book is believed to have been created for a Swiss patron, as evidenced by a miniature painting of St Boniface of Lausanne.

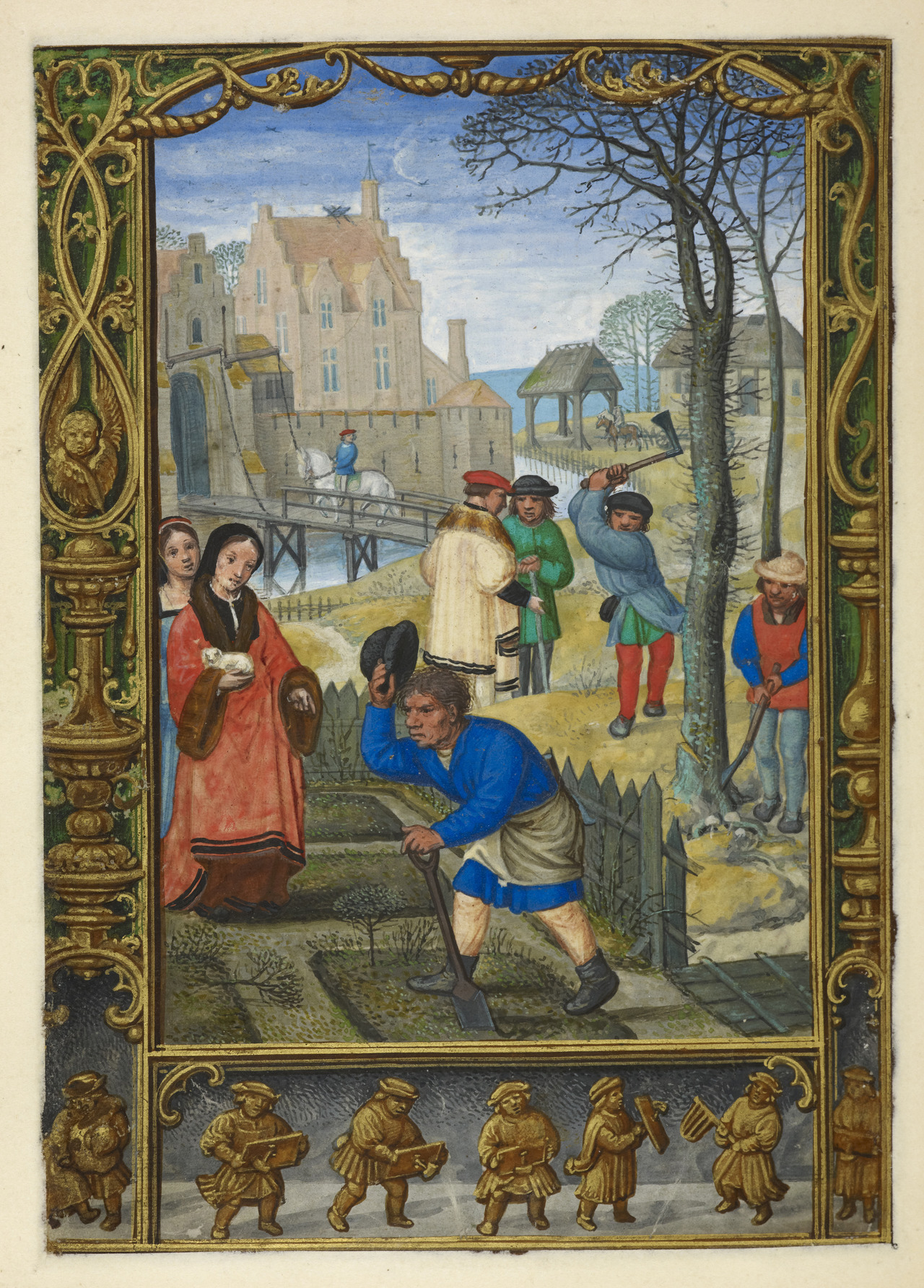
March- gardening and felling trees; and playing with rattles

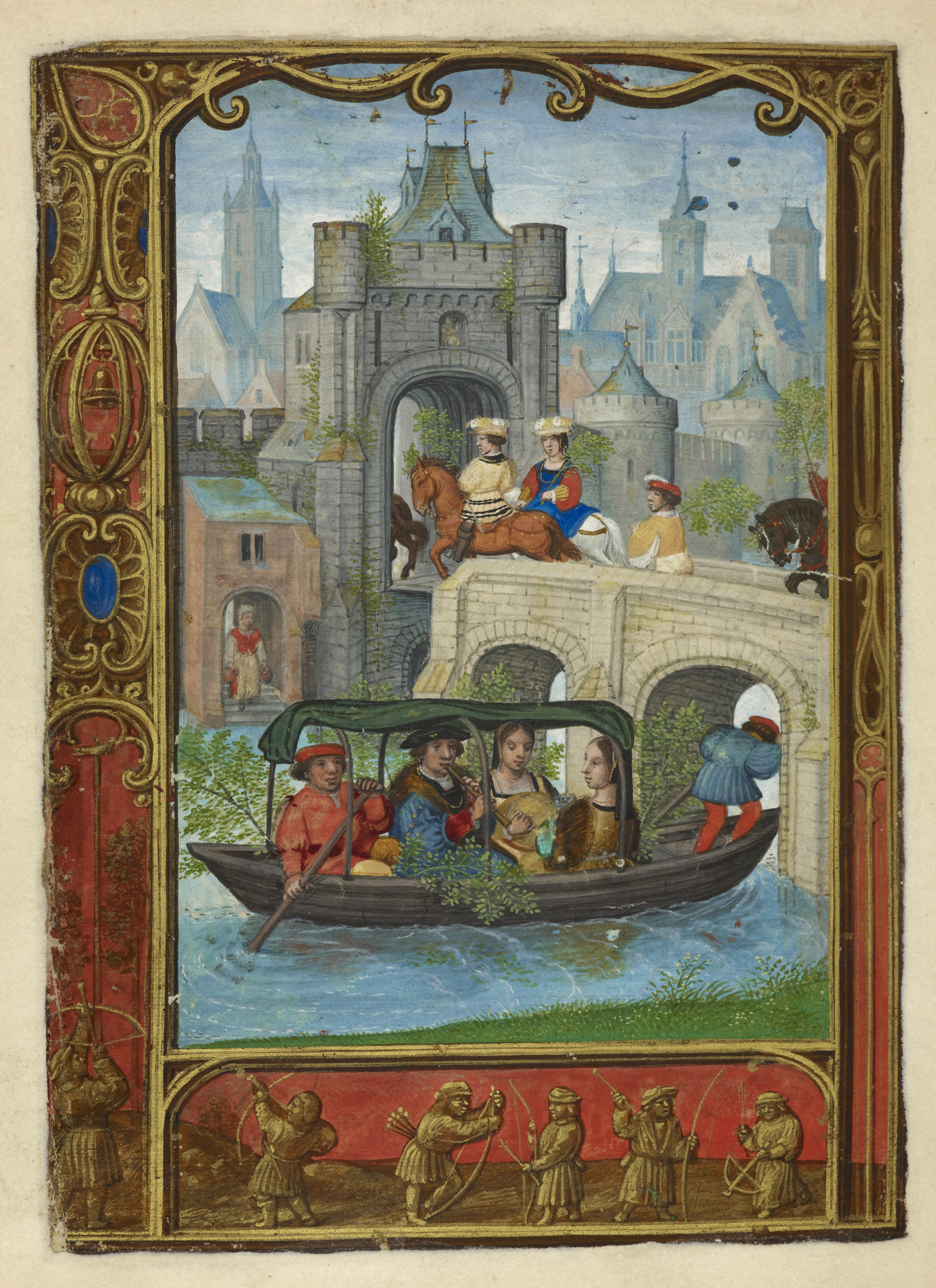
May- Boating party; and archery

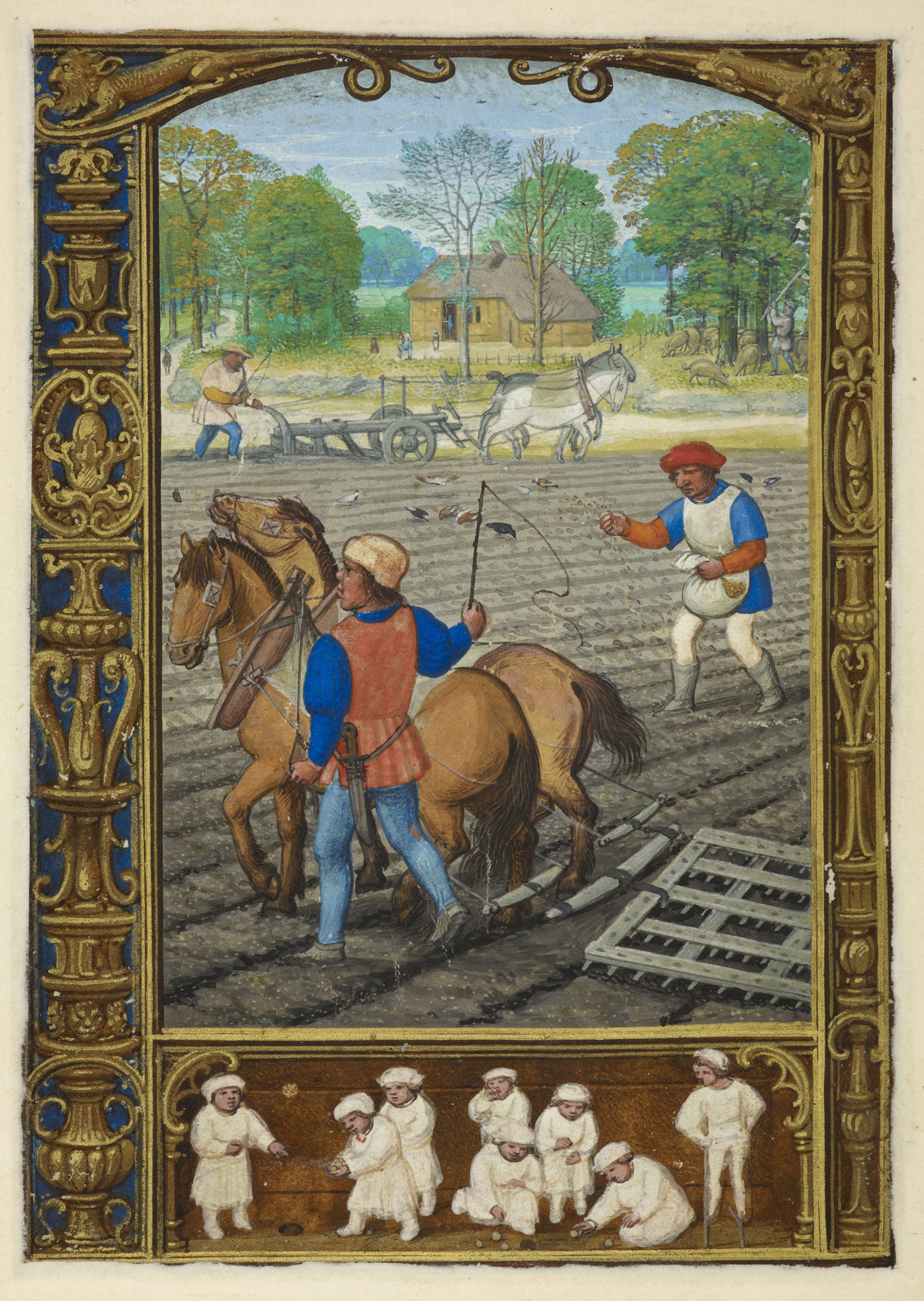
September- Ploughing, sowing and harrowing; and playing with marbles and stilts

== Description ==
The extant folios of the Golf Book are adorned with 21 full-page miniatures and numerous smaller paintings. In its current state, the book commences with a page belonging to the suffrages of the saints, depicting a bishop, likely St Boniface of Lausanne. The subsequent section (folios 2v–17v) comprises fragments of the Little Office of the Virgin, illustrated with a cycle of the Passion of Christ. The primary miniatures exhibit influence from a series of engravings of the Passion attributed to the Master of the Gardens of Love.

- Matins: Agony in the Garden
- Lauds: Kiss of Judas
- Prime: Christ brought before Pilate
- Terce: Flagellation
- Sext: Jesus nailed to the cross
- None: Crucifixion
- Vespers: Deposition
- Compline: Burial of Jesus

The last section (folios 18v–30r) features the calendar. The representation of each month covers two facing pages, with a full-page illustration on the left-hand page showing the occupations of the months.

At present, the extant folios of the book are in the wrong order; the suffrages of the saints and the Office of the Virgin are placed before the calendar.

== See also ==
- Hours of Hennessy
