= R&A World Golf Museum =

Sports museum in Fife, Scotland, United Kingdom

The R&A World Golf Museum

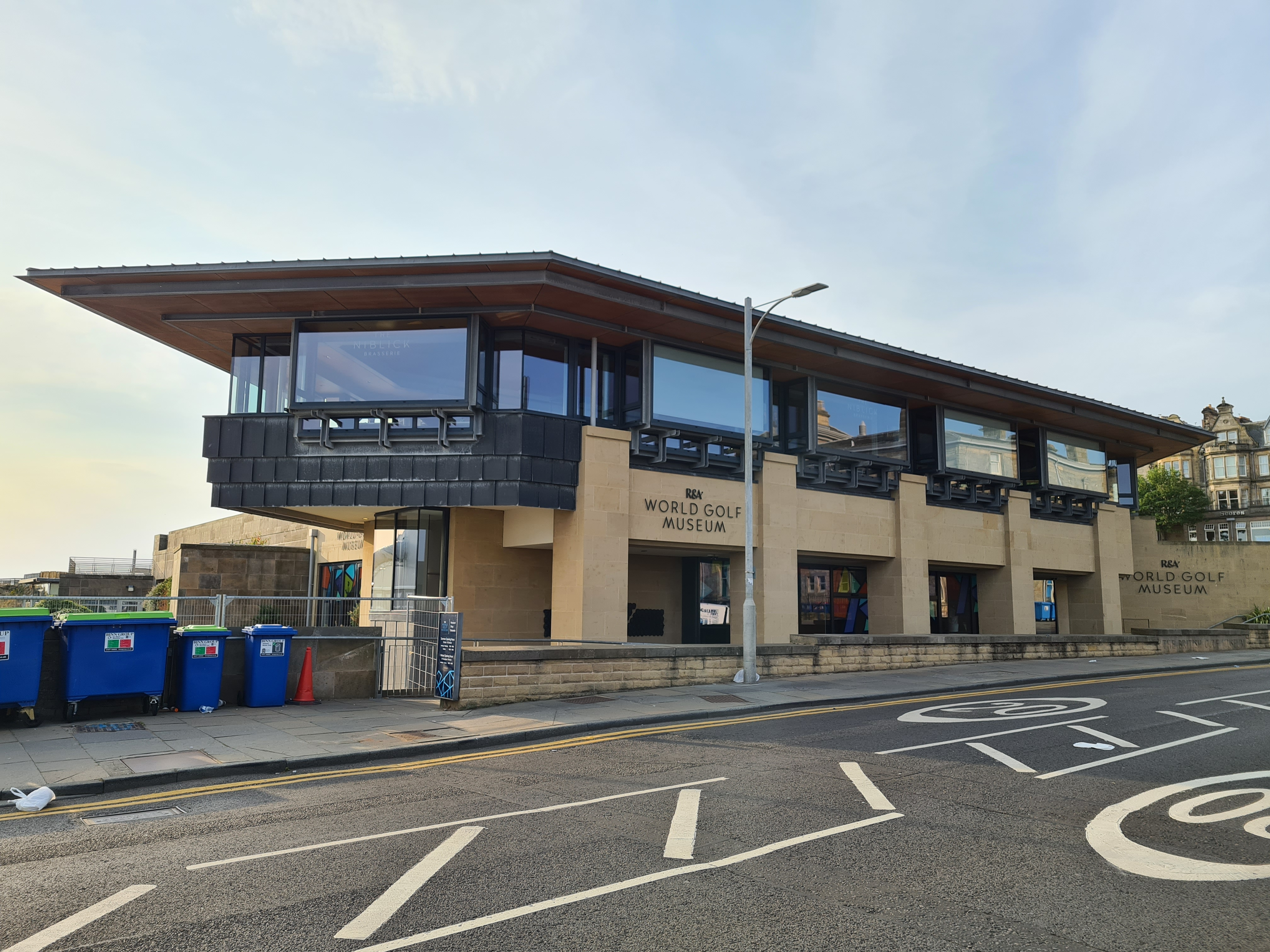
- The R&A World Golf Museum
- Former name: British Golf Museum
- Established: 1989 (opened in 1990)
- Location: Bruce Embankment, St Andrews, Scotland
- Coordinates: 56.343947°N 2.801755°W
- Architect: Richard Murphy Architects (renovated in June 2015)
- Owner: The R&A
- Website: www.worldgolfmuseum.com

The R&A World Golf Museum (previously known as the British Golf Museum) is located opposite the clubhouse of the Royal and Ancient Golf Club in St Andrews, Scotland. The R&A owns and operates the museum.

The museum, which opened in 1990, documents the history of golf from Medieval times to the present, including the men's and women's games, British and international, both professional and amateur. Exhibits include historic equipment, memorabilia and art work, documentation, the history of the Royal and Ancient Golf Club, and the rules and terminology of the game.

== History ==
The museum was established in 1989 in an existing, single-storey building behind the Clubhouse. Later, the building was renovated and expanded, for a total area of 580 square metres (6,200 sq ft), including a rooftop cafe. Construction started in summer 2014 and was completed in June 2015.

The museum reopened on 21 Jun 2021 as The R&A World Golf Museum, previously known as the British Golf Museum.

== Women Golfers' Museum ==
The museum displays part of the collection of the Women Golfers' Museum (WGM), while its books, photographs etc. are housed in the special collections of University of St Andrews Library. The WGM was opened in April 1939 at the Lady Golfers' Club in London, with Issette Pearson as president and Mabel Stringer as chairman. In 1961 the Lady Golfers Club merged with the Golfers Club but by 1968 the museum had to find a new home and was displayed in various London clubs and from 1977 to 1980 at Colgate-Palmolive's offices. It was shown in the National Museum of Antiquities in Edinburgh from 1982 to 1984, before moving to its current home. The collection "present[s] a comprehensive history of the ladies' game" and includes material such as Rhona Adair's golf-balls and Poppy Wingate's shoes.

== Images of the R&A World Golf Museum ==
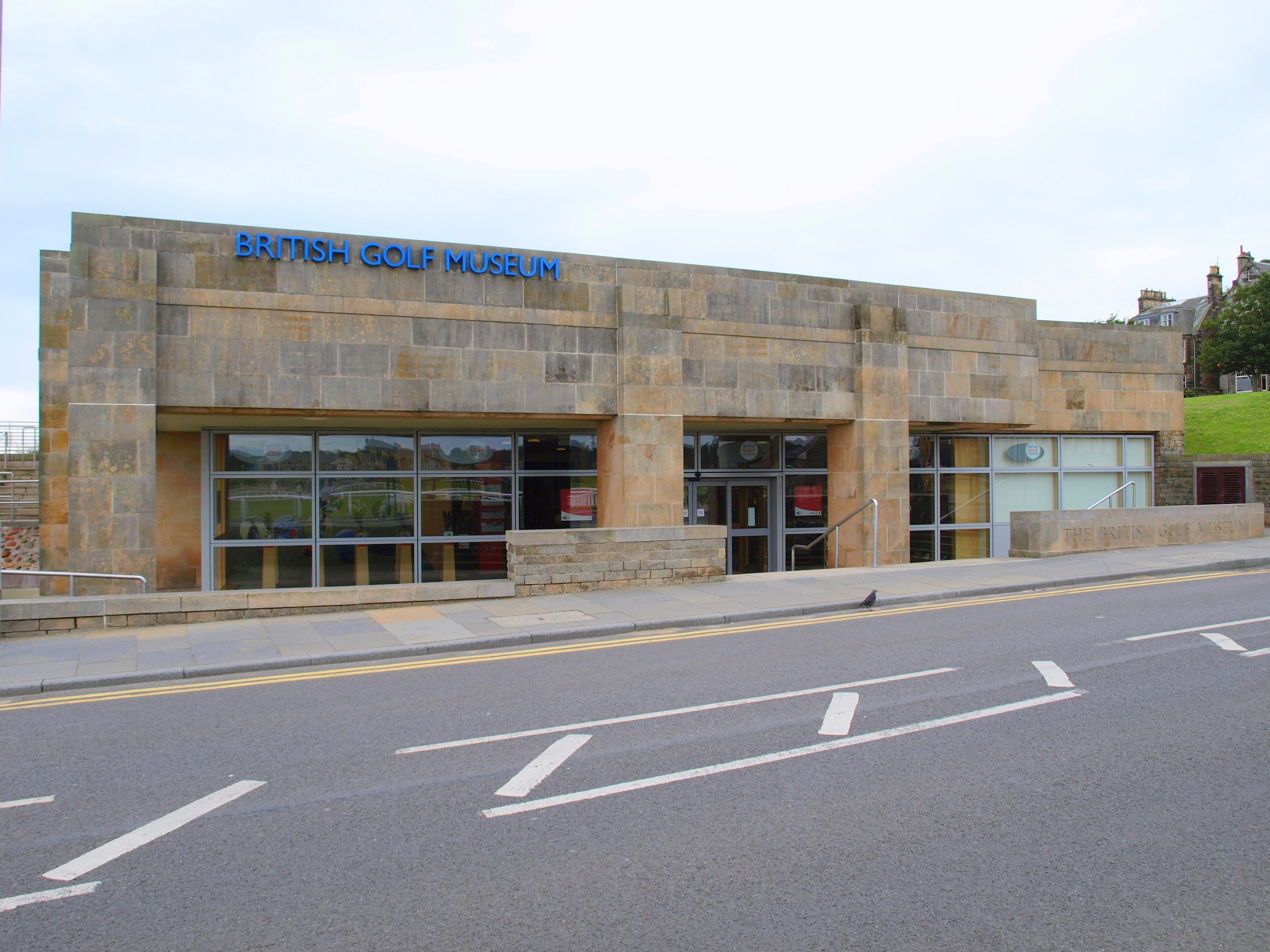
The British Golf Museum in 2009 before it was renovated

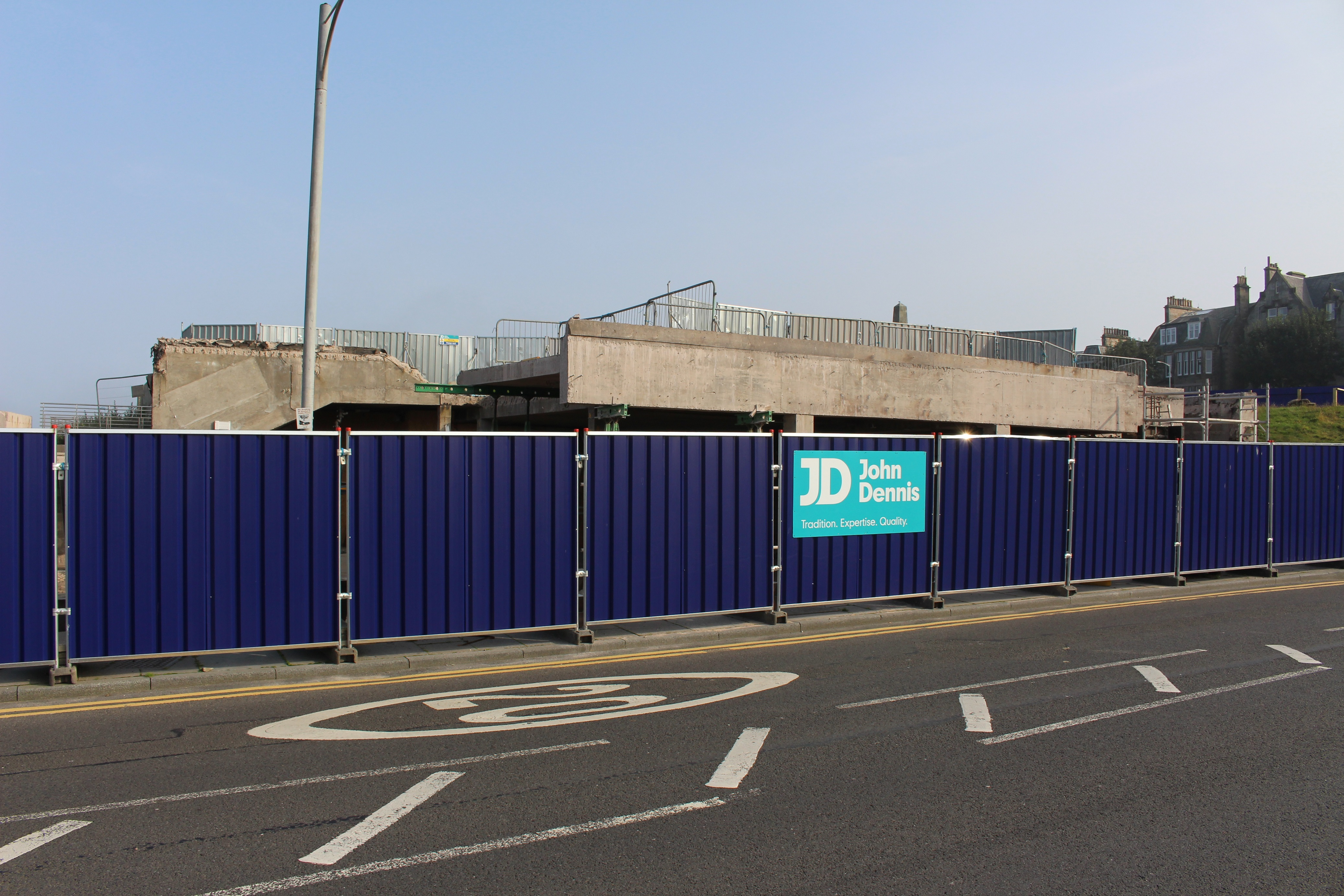
The museum during renovation in 2014

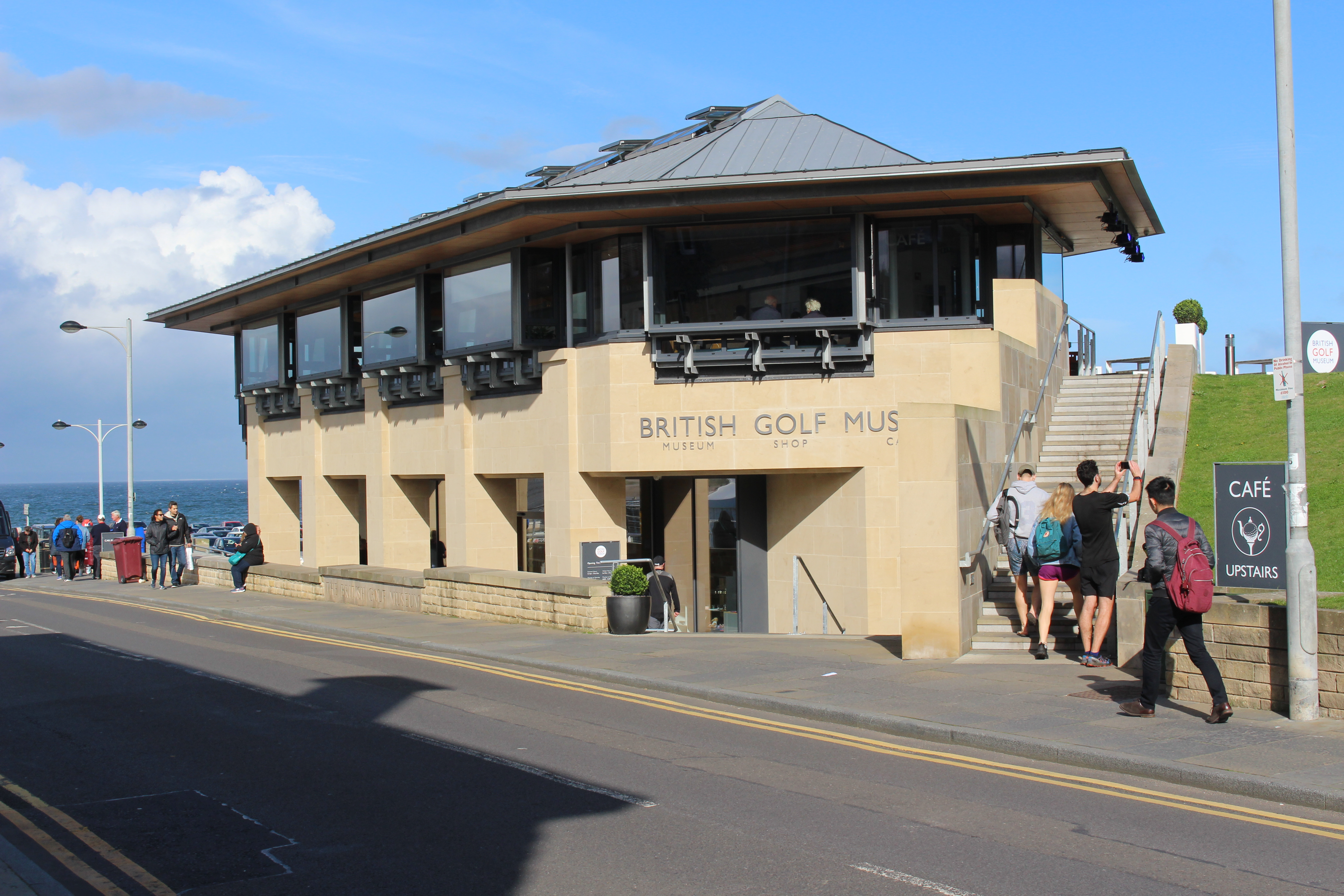
The British Golf Museum in 2017 after it was renovated

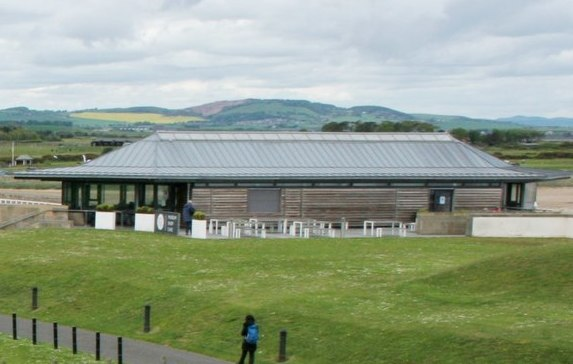
The rear of the British Golf Museum in 2019

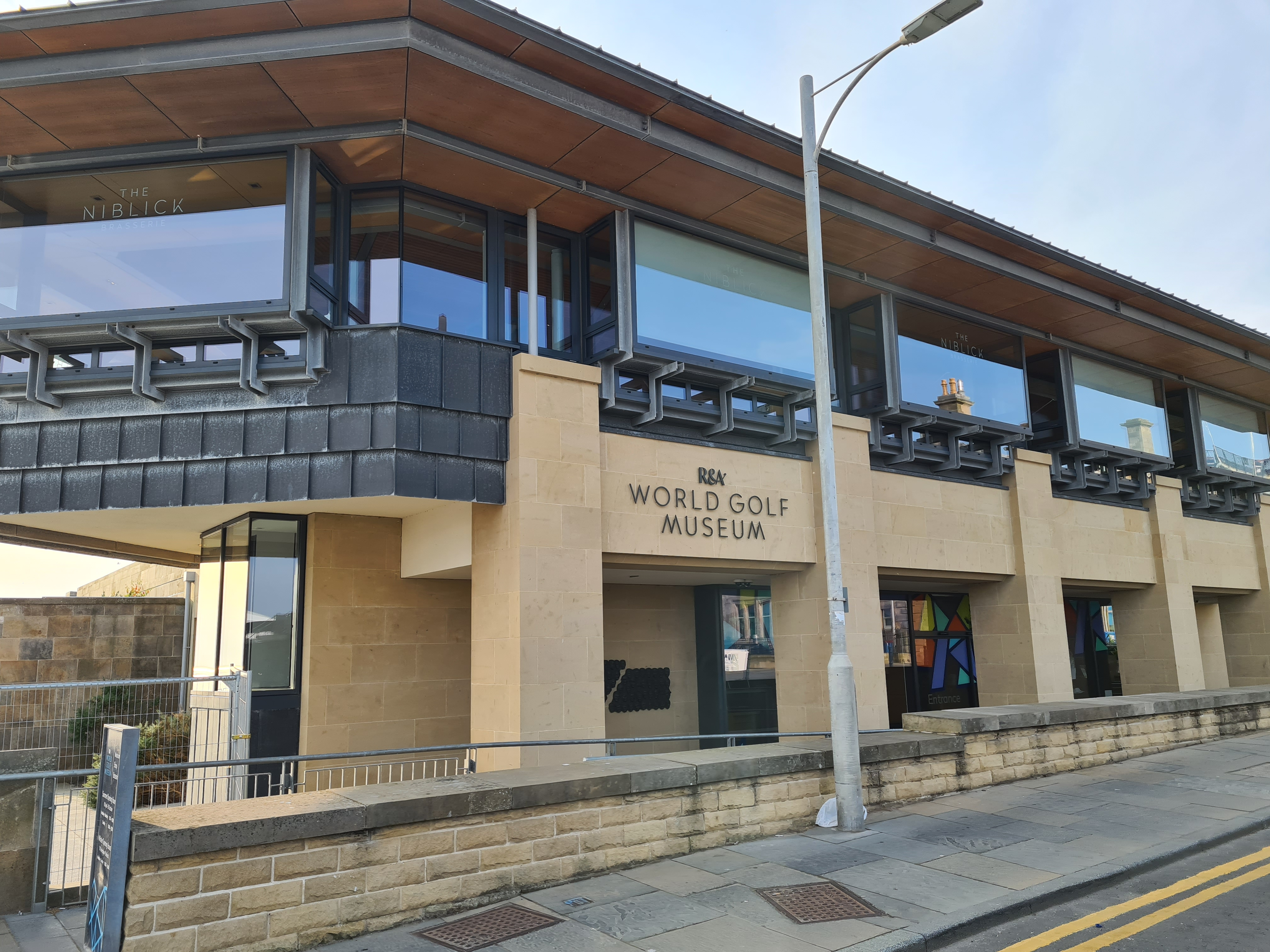
The R&A World Golf Museum in 2022

== See also ==
- History of golf
- USGA Museum
- World Golf Hall of Fame
- Canadian Golf Hall of Fame
- Jack Nicklaus Museum
