= USGA Museum =

Sports museum in Liberty Corner, New Jersey

Coordinates: 40.666023°N 74.612842°W

United States Golf Association Museum and Arnold Palmer Center for Golf History

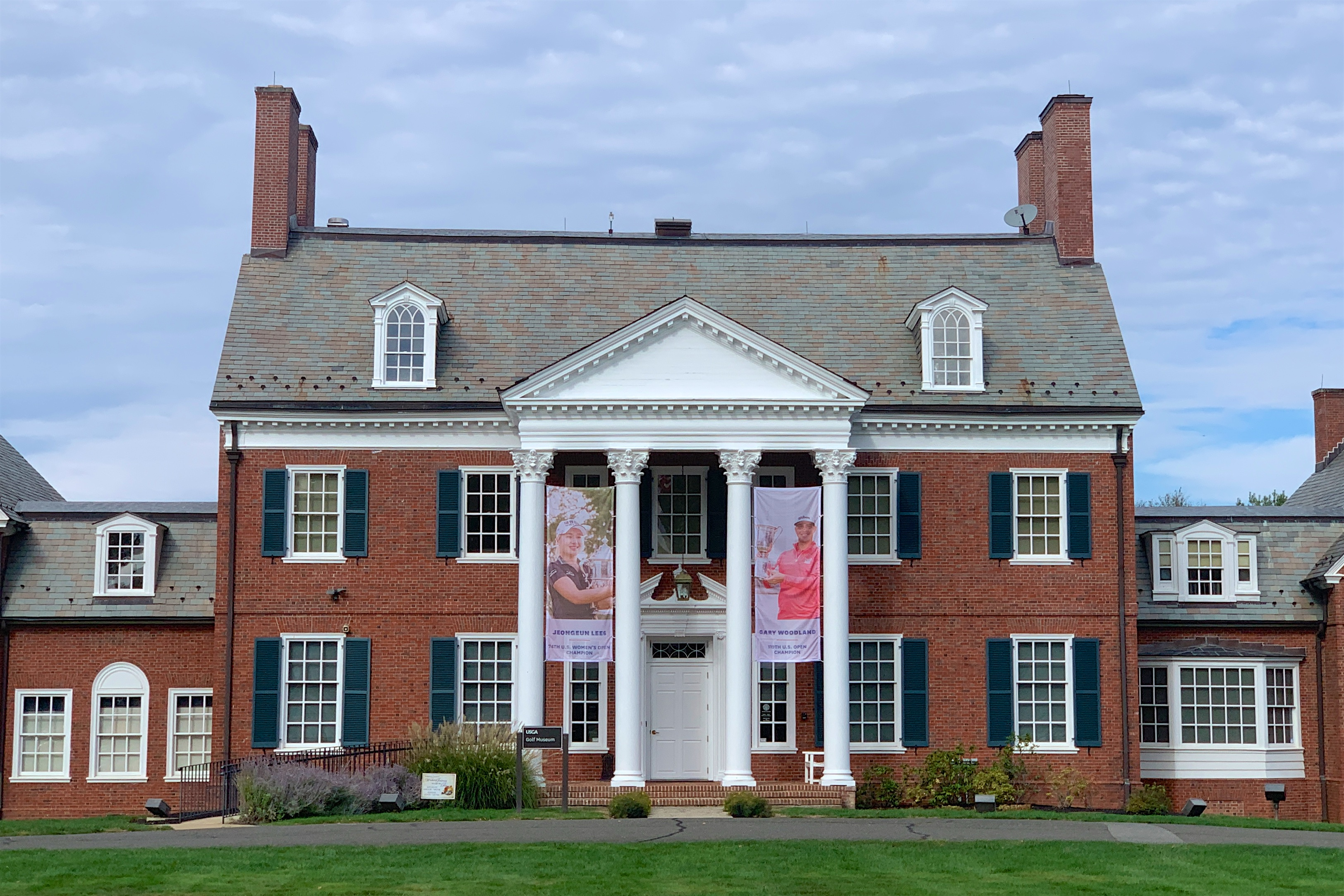
- USGA Museum in 2019
- Established: 1936
- Location: Liberty Corner, New Jersey
- Type: Sports museum
- Director: Hilary Cronheim
- Website: www.usgamuseum.com

The United States Golf Association Museum and Arnold Palmer Center for Golf History is home to a collection of golf artifacts and memorabilia. It is located adjacent to the United States Golf Association's headquarters in Liberty Corner, New Jersey.

== Museum history ==
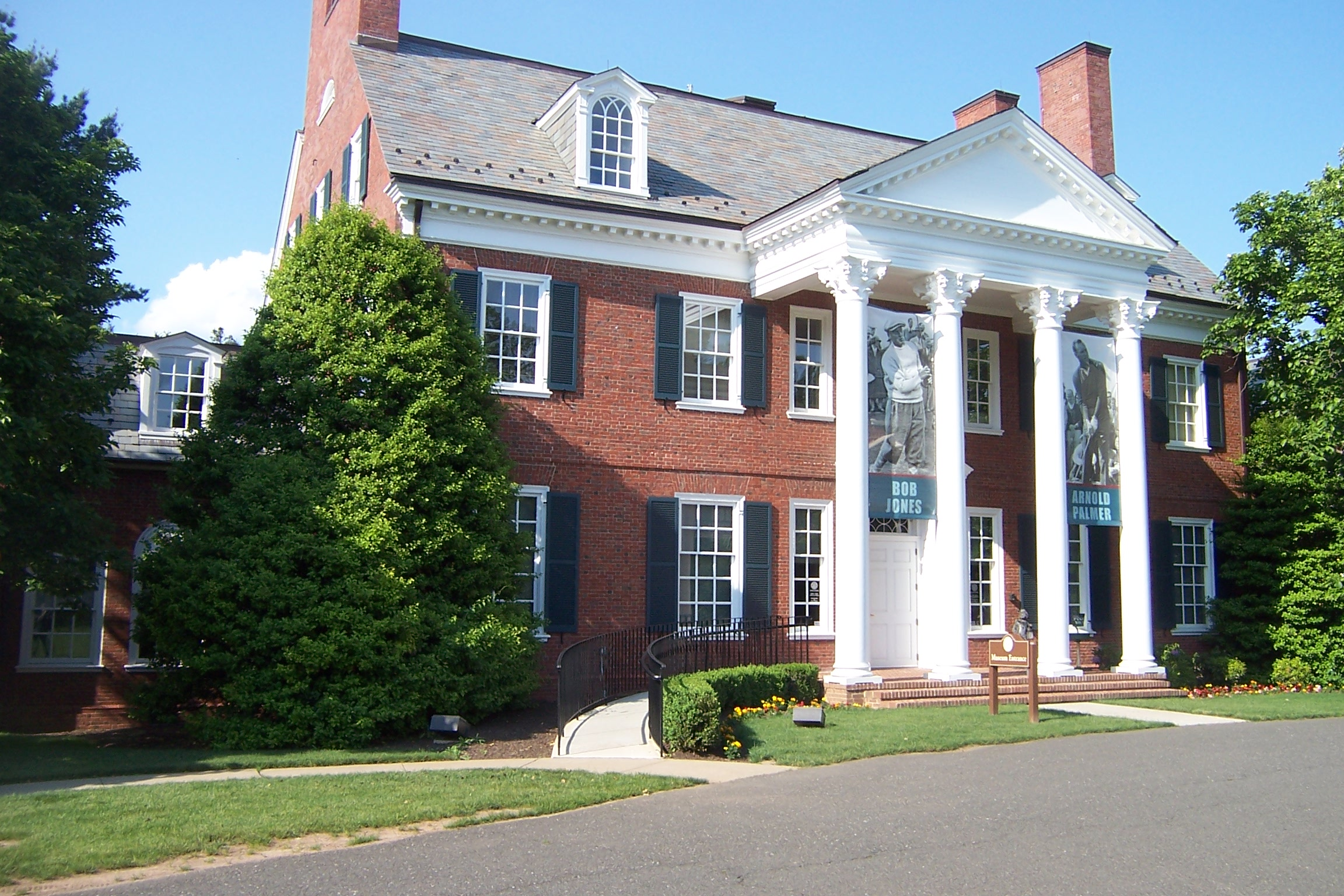
The USGA Museum building, built in 1919 by John Russell Pope

The origins of the USGA Museum can be traced to 1935, when George Blossom, a member of the USGA's Executive Committee, first proposed the creation of a collection of historical golf artifacts. One year later, in an effort to formalize the Museum, the USGA Museum and Library Committee was created with the primary function of collecting historically significant artifacts and books. The first significant donation to the Museum – Bobby Jones' legendary putter, Calamity Jane II – followed in 1938.

For the first 16 years of its existence, the Museum had no formal home and artifacts were displayed throughout the USGA offices in New York. In 1951, when the Association purchased the property at 40 East 38th Street in New York City, the first dedicated display space for the collections was created and the Museum was formally opened. Since 1972, the USGA's headquarters in Liberty Corner, New Jersey, has provided public exhibition galleries, staff offices and collections storage for the Museum. The Museum is housed in a building designed in 1919 by John Russell Pope, a noted architect who also designed the National Archives Building and the Jefferson Memorial.

In 2005, the Museum was closed for a three-year renovation and expansion project. The Museum, which re-opened June 3, 2008, now includes the Arnold Palmer Center for Golf History, which provides 16,000 square feet (1,500 m^{2}) of additional space, with more than 5,000 square feet (460 m^{2}) of new exhibition galleries, a research center and technologically advanced storage rooms.

In 2012, the U.S. Amateur Trophy and a replica of Ben Hogan's 1953 Hickok Belt were stolen from the museum's collection during a break-in.

== Museum exhibits ==
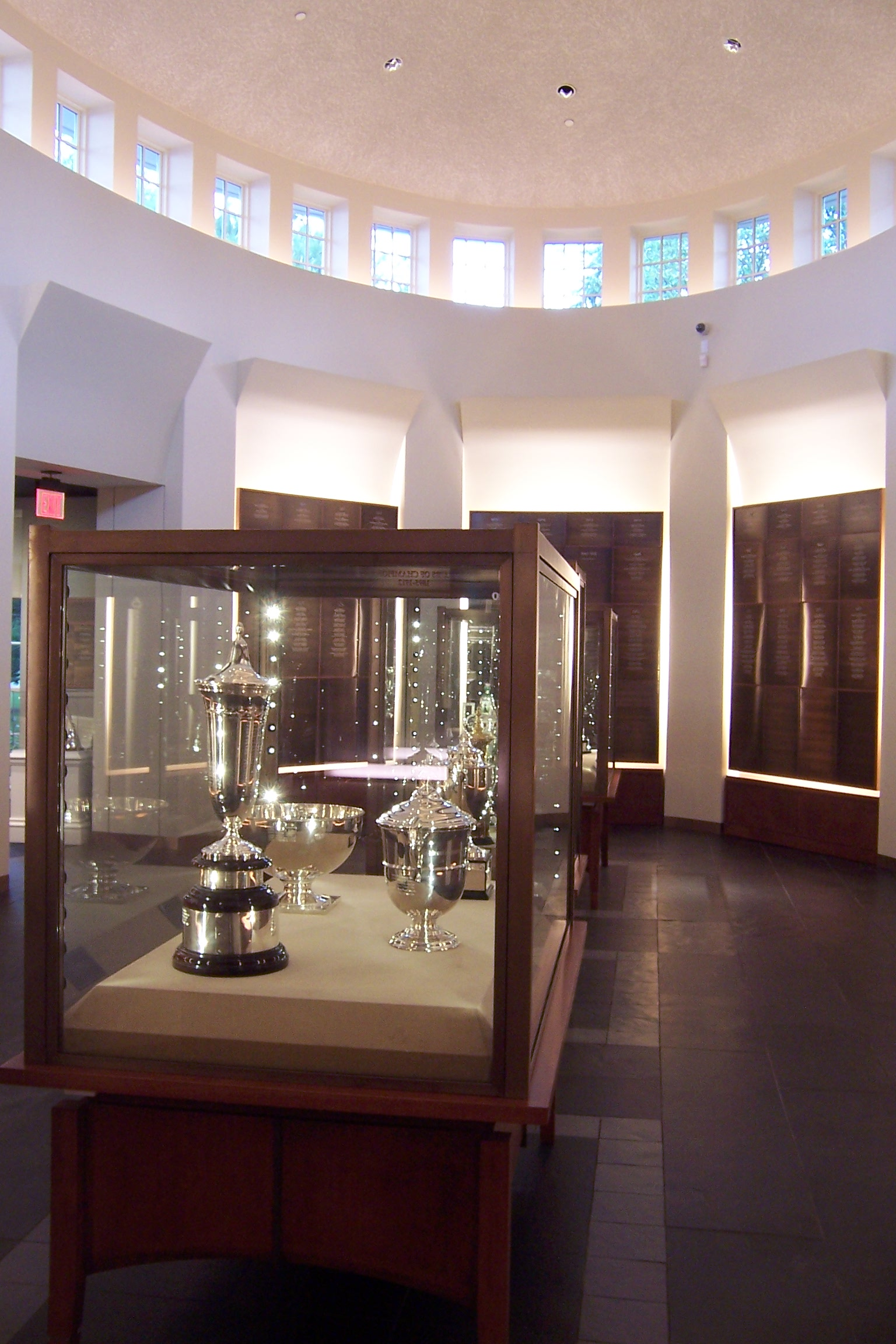
The Hall of Champions rotunda inside the USGA Museum

The USGA Museum showcases the nation's largest and most significant collection of golf artifacts and documents. The interactive multimedia exhibits tell the story of the game's development in the United States, highlighting the greatest moments in the game's history, with a particular focus on USGA champions and championships.

=== The Hall of Champions ===
The oval rotunda, illuminated by a clerestory, houses all 13 USGA national championship trophies, while the names of every USGA champion, such as eight-time winners Bobby Jones and Tiger Woods, are inscribed on bronze panels that encircle the room.

=== Permanent Galleries ===
The Permanent Galleries in the USGA Museum tell the story of golf in America, from the late 19th century to the present. Each gallery focuses on an era and iconic moment – champions and events in the game's history that are pivotal for understanding the growth, evolution, and significance of the game in U.S. history. Special rooms are dedicated to Bobby Jones, Ben Hogan, and Arnold Palmer.

== The Pynes Putting Course ==
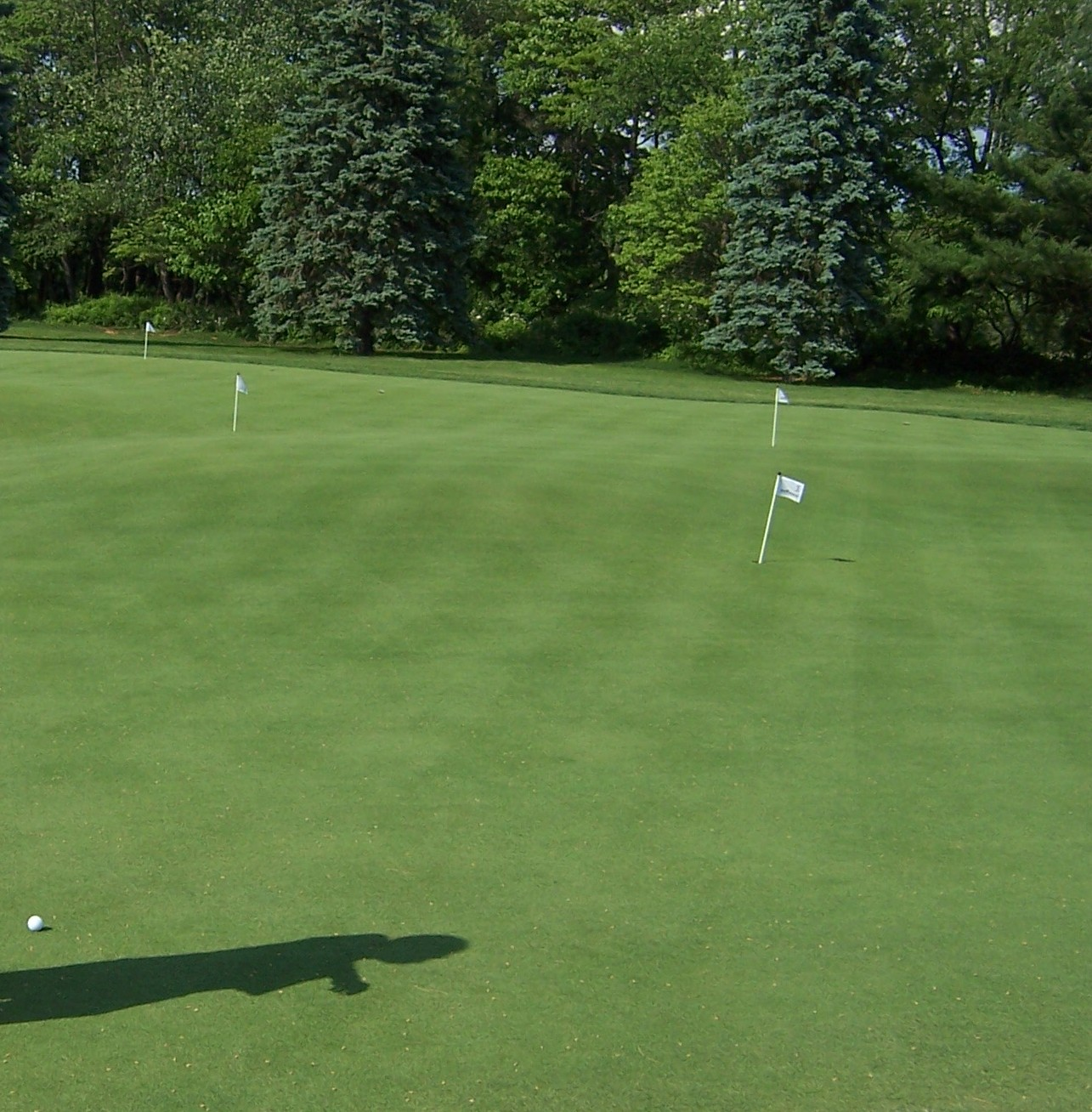
A portion of the difficult Pynes Putting Course at the USGA Museum

The Pynes Putting Course is a 16,000-square-foot (1,500 m^{2}), nine-hole facility.

== See also ==
- Golf in the United States
- History of golf
- Jack Nicklaus Museum – American sports museum in Columbus, Ohio, USA
- World Golf Hall of Fame – Sports museum and hall of fame in Pinehurst, North Carolina
- Canadian Golf Hall of Fame – Sports museum in Oakville, Ontario, Canada
- R&A World Golf Museum – Sports museum in Fife, Scotland, United Kingdom
