= Coby Whitmore =

American painter and illustrator (1913–1988)

- Born: Maxwell Coburn Whitmore; June 11, 1913; Dayton, Ohio, U.S.
- Died: October 12, 1988 (aged 75); Hilton Head, South Carolina, U.S.
- Known for: Commercial art, Magazine illustration
- Awards: Society of Illustrators Hall of Fame

Maxwell Coburn Whitmore (June 11, 1913 – October 12, 1988) was an American painter and magazine illustrator known for his Saturday Evening Post covers, and a commercial artist whose work included advertisements for Gallo Wine and other brands. He additionally became known as a race-car designer.

Whitmore was inducted into the Society of Illustrators Hall of Fame in 1978.

== Biography ==
=== Early life and career ===
Whitmore illustration for the March 28, 1953, issue of The Saturday Evening Post

Coby Whitmore was born in Dayton, Ohio, the son of Maxwell Coburn Whitmore Sr. and Charlotte Bosler. He graduated from Steele High School and attended the Dayton Art Institute. After moving to Chicago, Illinois, he apprenticed with Haddon Sundblom, illustrator of the "Sundblom Circle", in addition to working for the Chicago Herald Examiner and taking night classes at the Chicago Art Institute. Whitmore moved to New York in 1942 and shortly afterward joined the Charles E. Cooper Studio, on West 57th Street in New York City. There he illustrated for leading magazines of the day and did other commercial art.

Whitmore and Jon Whitcomb were two of the top illustrators at Cooper, which in the 1940s and 1950s "monopolized the ladies' magazines like McCall's, Ladies Home Journal, and Good Housekeeping with postwar images of the ideal white American family centered around pretty, middle-class, female consumers living happily in new kitchens, new houses, driving new cars, living with handsome husbands, adorable children, and cute dogs".

Aside from women's magazines, Whitmore also illustrated for Esquire, The Saturday Evening Post and Sports Illustrated.

=== Later life and career ===
Additionally, Whitmore, by then living in Briarcliff Manor, New York, teamed with former World War II fighter pilot John Fitch, an imported car dealer in White Plains, New York, to design and race sports cars in the 1950s and 1960s.

=== Personal life ===
He and his wife, Virginia, moved to Hilton Head, South Carolina, in 1968. He died there on October 12, 1988, at age 75.

== Legacy ==
Whitmore's work influenced such comic-book artists as John Buscema, John Romita, Sr., and Phil Noto. Glen Murakami, producer of the 2000s Teen Titans animated series on Cartoon Network, cited Whitmore and fellow illustrator Bob Peak as "big influences on the loose, painterly style we have been using for the backgrounds".

His work was presented alongside that of several contemporaries of illustrator Al Parker in the "Re-Imagining the American Woman" section of the retrospective "Ephemeral Beauty: Al Parker and the American Women's Magazine, 1940-1960", mounted by the Norman Rockwell Museum from June 9 to October 28, 2007.

Whitmore art is included in the permanent collections of The Pentagon, the United States Air Force Academy, the New Britain Museum of American Art, Syracuse University, and the Jack Nicklaus Museum.

== Accolades ==
Whitmore was inducted into the Society of Illustrators Hall of Fame in 1978.

He received awards from the Art Directors Clubs of New York, Philadelphia and Chicago.
