= Hours of Hennessy =

The Hours of Hennessy or Hours of Notre-Dame is an illuminated book of Hours attributed to the Bruges artist Simon Bening and his workshop created in the 1530s. Its original commissioner is unknown and it is unknown how it was acquired by its later owners the Irish Hennessy family. It was bought for 12,000 Belgian francs from Peter Hennessy's heirs by the Royal Library of Belgium in 1874, and is one of its most important manuscripts.

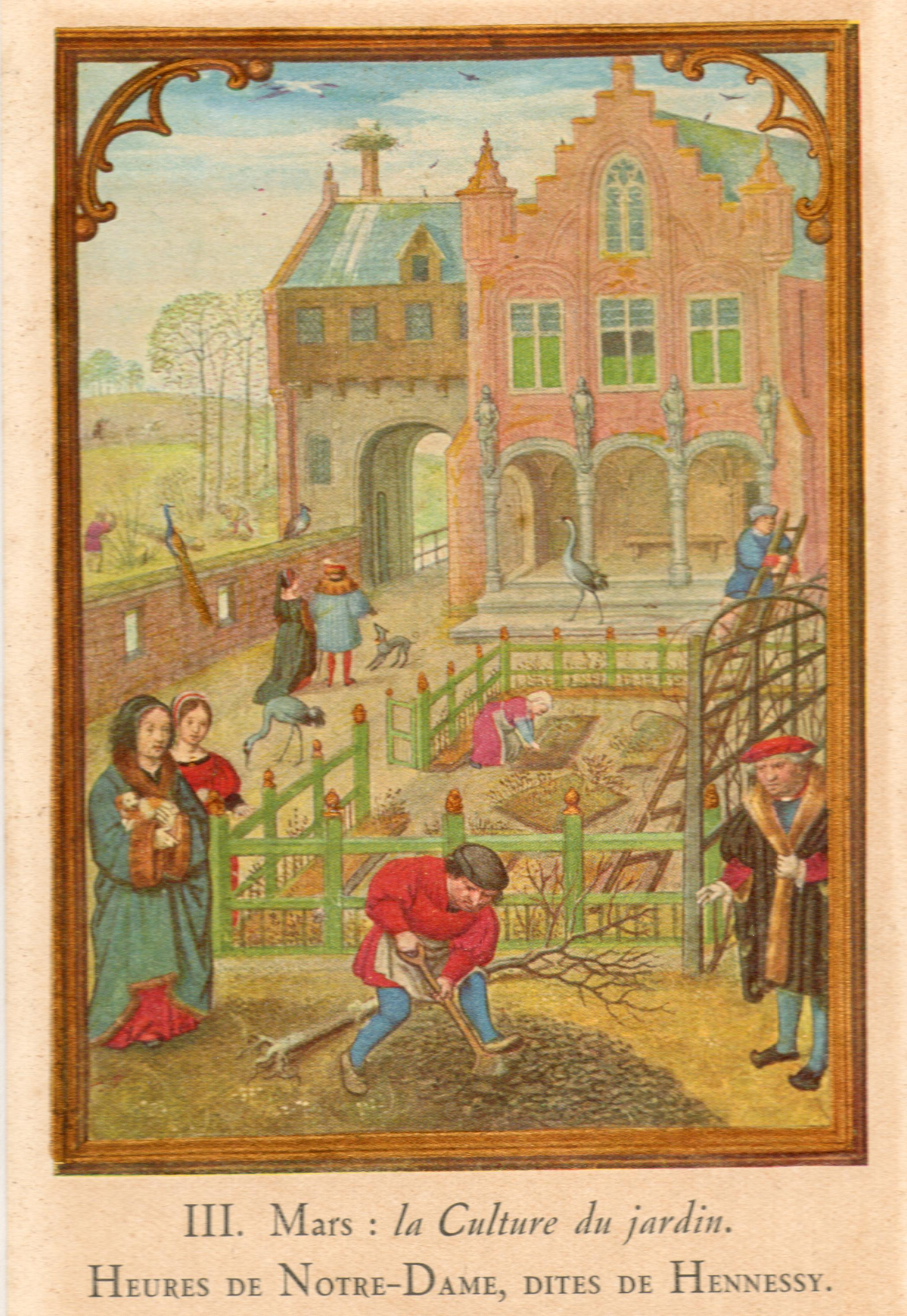
March

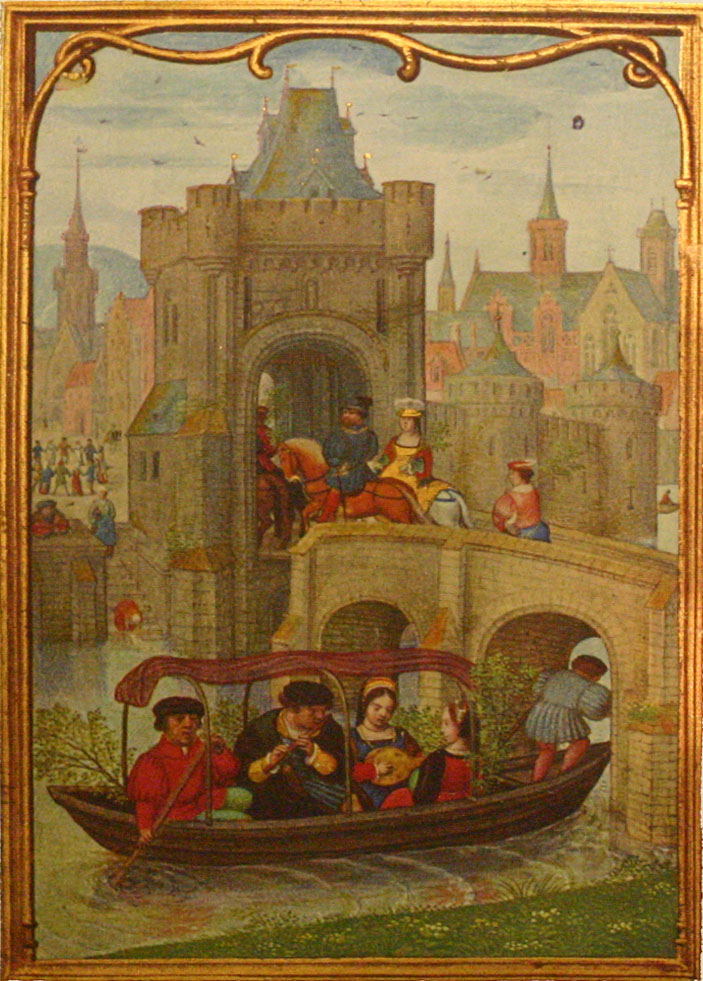
May.

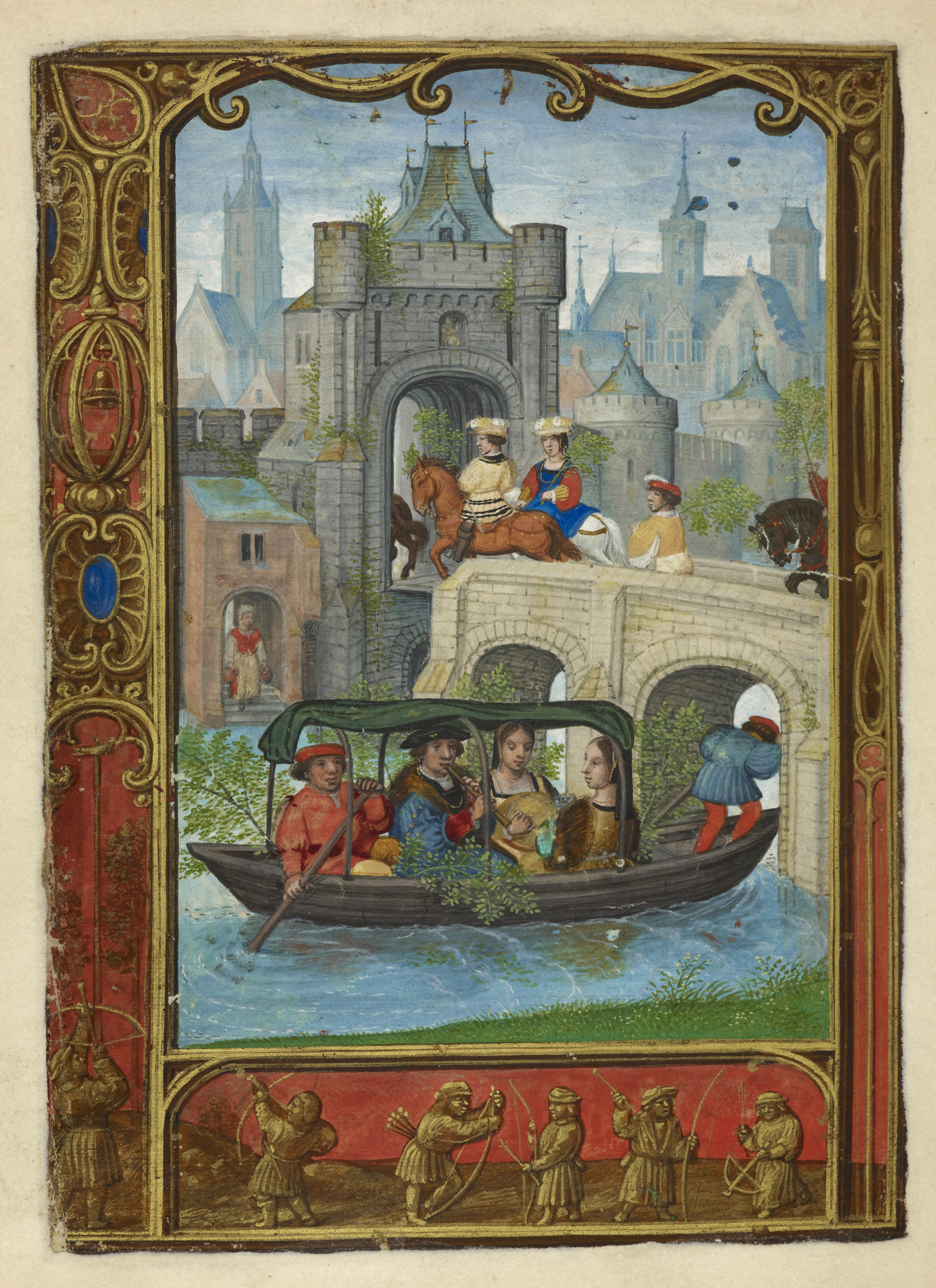
May, (from the Golf book).

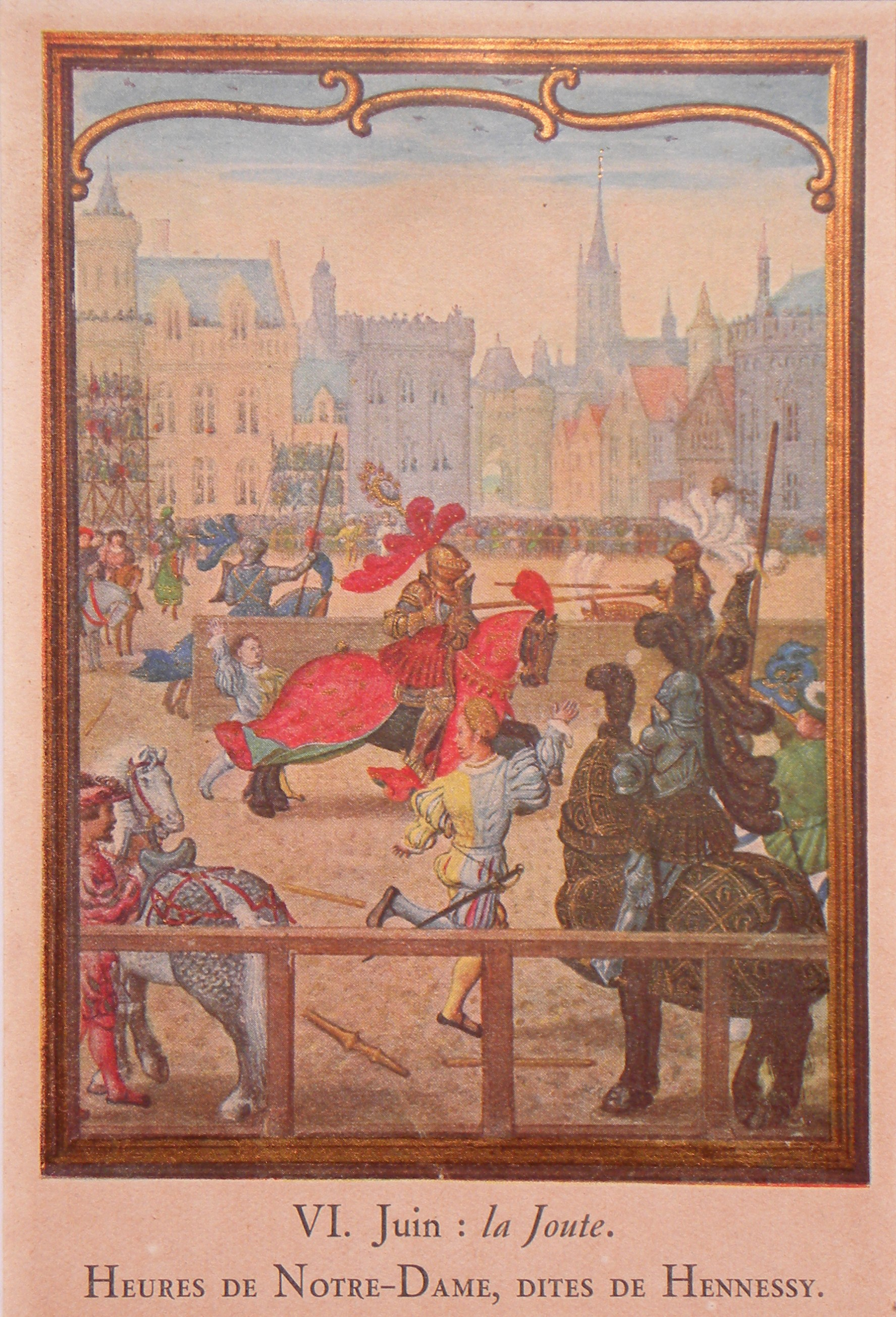
June.

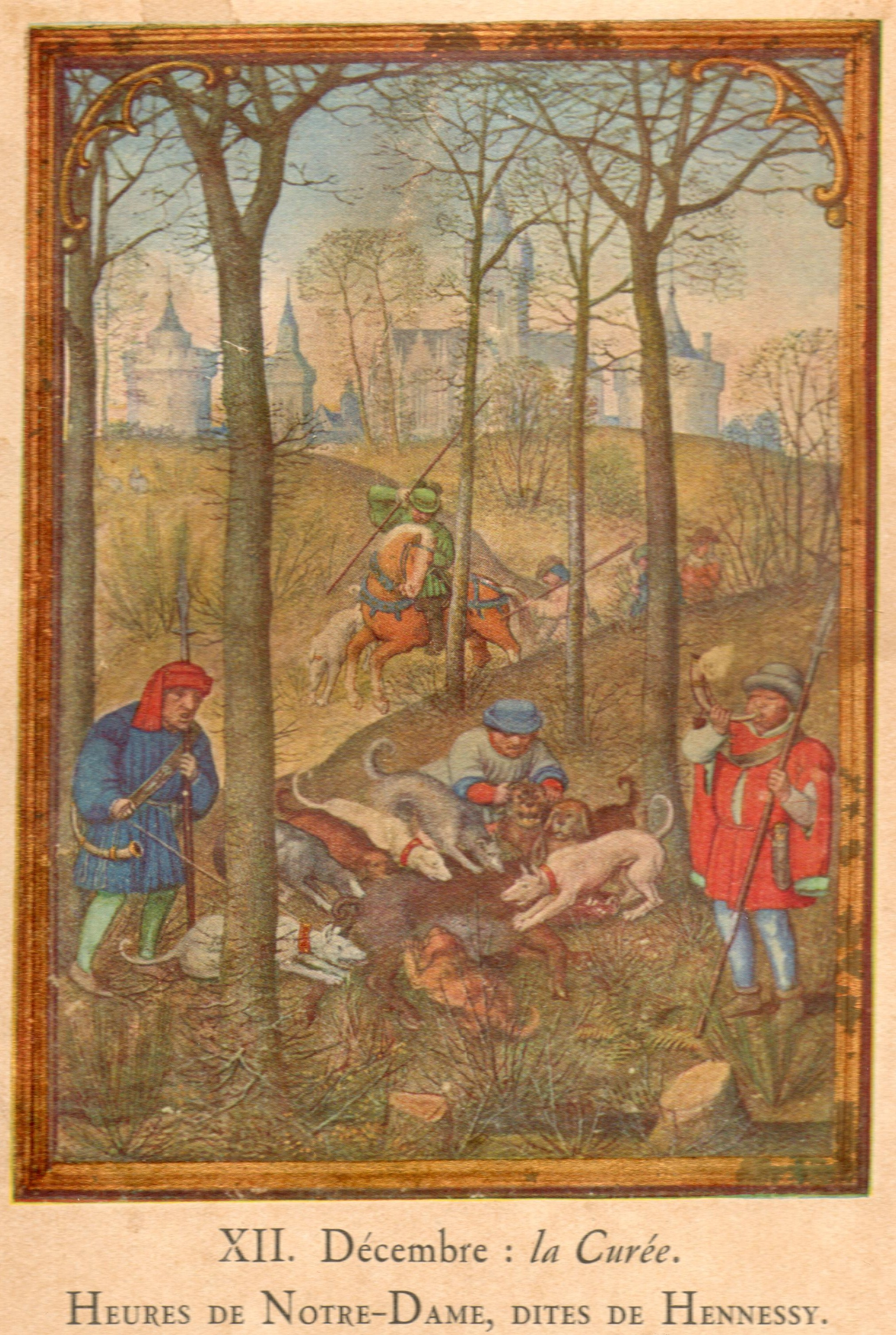
December.

== See also ==
- Golf book
