= World Golf Hall of Fame =

Sports museum and hall of fame in Pinehurst, North Carolina

Coordinates: 29°59′28″N 81°28′13″W

World Golf Hall of Fame and Museum
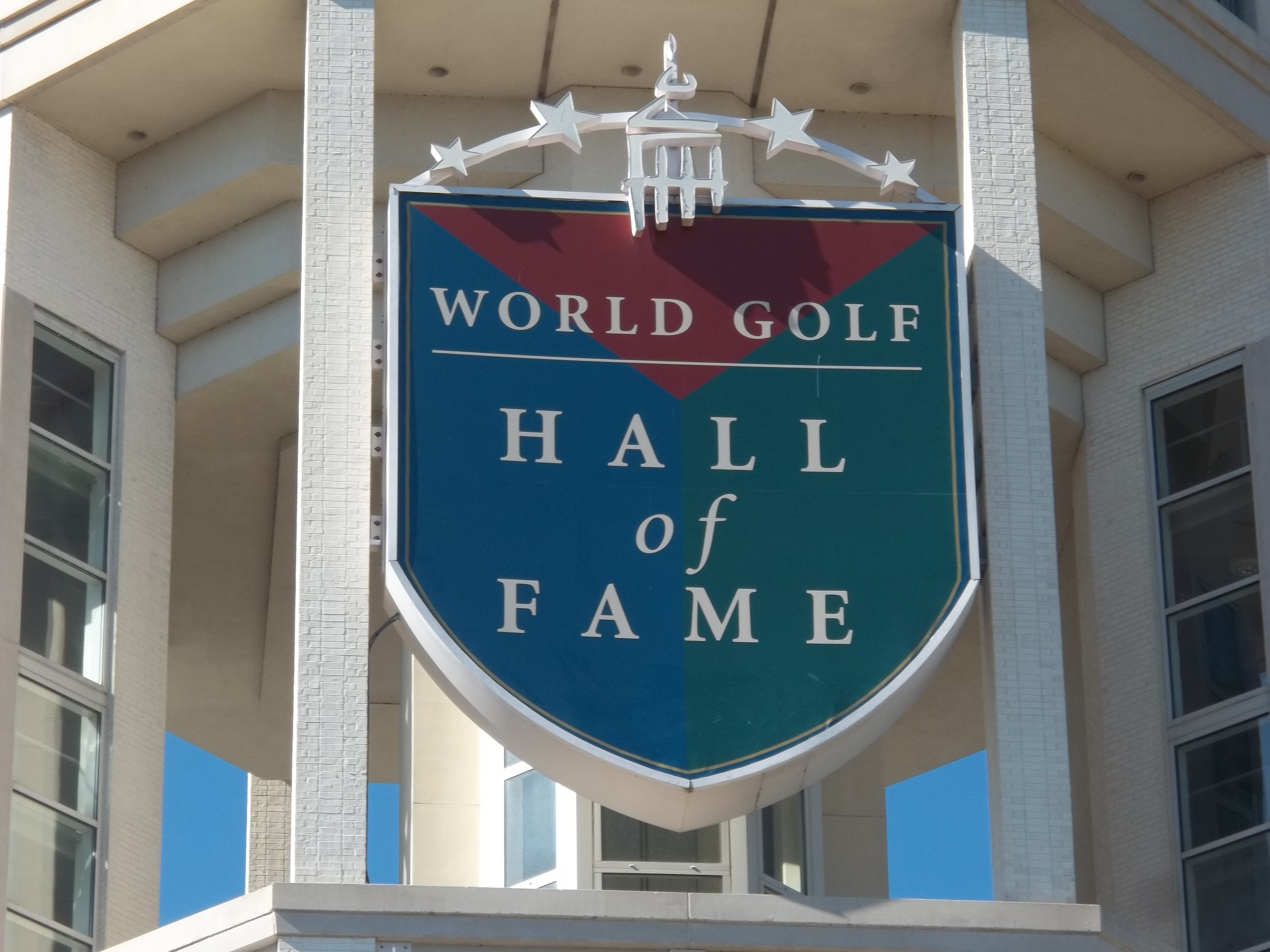

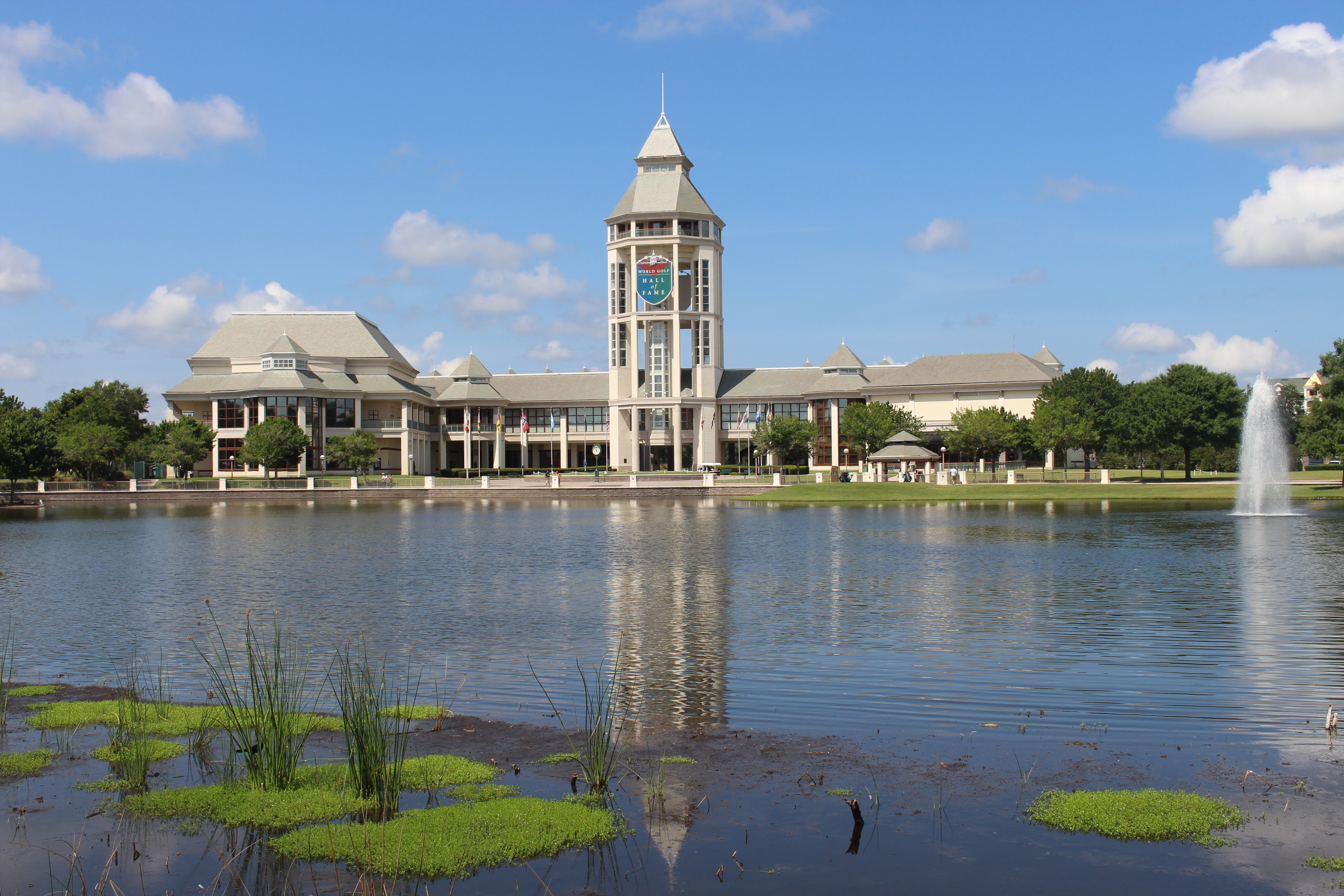
- Hall of Fame building at World Golf Village
- Established: September 1974 (past location: May 19, 1998)
- Location: Pinehurst, North Carolina
- Type: Professional sports hall of fame
- Visitors: 350,000/year (2009)
- Website: www.worldgolfhalloffame.org

The World Golf Hall of Fame is an American history museum and hall of fame located in Pinehurst, North Carolina. Previously located at World Golf Village in St. Johns County, Florida, it was moved back to its original host city of Pinehurst to a new campus opened in 2024. The hall is supported by a consortium of 26 golf organizations from around the world.

The Hall of Fame Museum Building was designed by the specialist museum architecture firm E. Verner Johnson and Associates of Boston. They also produced the museum master plan that established the size, mission, and qualities of the museum and the surrounding facilities and site.

The Hall of Fame Museum features a permanent exhibition and a rolling program of temporary exhibitions. Designed by museum design firm Ralph Appelbaum Associates, the Hall of Fame and exhibition area contain exhibits on the game's history, heritage, and techniques; major players and organizations; and golf-course design, equipment, and dress.

== History ==
The World Golf Hall of Fame is located in Pinehurst, North Carolina, and was originally privately operated by Diamondhead Corp., then owners of the Pinehurst Resort. It opened in September 1974 with an initial class of 13 members. Initially it was a local project, but the PGA of America took over management in 1983 and acquired full ownership in 1986.

Two other halls of fame have been merged into the World Golf Hall of Fame. The PGA of America established one in 1940, which was merged into the Pinehurst Hall in the 1980s. The Hall of Fame of Women's Golf was established by the LPGA in 1951, with four charter members: Patty Berg, Betty Jameson, Louise Suggs, and Babe Zaharias. It was inactive for some years, but in 1967 it moved into its first physical premises, which were in Augusta, Georgia, and was renamed the LPGA Tour Hall of Fame. In 1998, it merged into the World Golf Hall of Fame.

In 1994 the global golf industry established the nonprofit World Golf Foundation to promote the sport, with the creation of an enhanced Hall of Fame as one of its main objectives. Construction at the new site in St. Johns County, Florida, began in 1996 and the new facility opened on May 19, 1998, and closed in September 2023.

The new USGA Pinehurst Golf House now houses the Hall of Fame that opened in 2024.

== Membership categories ==
In October 2013, the hall announced that it was reviewing its selection process and that there would be no induction ceremony in 2014. A new process was announced in March 2014.

Starting in 2014, members were inducted into the Hall of Fame in one of four categories: Male Competitor, Female Competitor, Veterans, and Lifetime Achievement categories. Elections are held every other year with induction ceremonies in odd number years beginning in 2015. The process has changed from that used from 1996 to 2013. The minimum qualifications for male and female competitors are: minimum of 40 years old, or five years removed from "active competition" and 15 or more wins on "approved tours" or two "major wins". The veterans category is primarily for those golfers whose careers ended before 1980 and includes both amateurs and professionals. The lifetime achievement category remains from the old system.

The hall again revised the criteria in 2020 and now recognize two categories: Competitor and Contributor.

A 30-member nominating sub-committee composed of Hall of Fame members, World Golf Foundation Board organizations and members of the media will choose from among the eligible candidates and nominate a total of 10 individuals (four male competitors, four female competitors, and two contributors). A separate 20-member selection committee will then vote on all four ballots. Election to the Hall of Fame will require 75% of the vote and each year's election class is limited to two from each ballot and five total.

In 2016, the hall announced that the age requirement would be raised to 50 from 40 years old. In 2020, the age requirement was lowered from 50 to 45.

=== Qualification details ===
==== Male ====
- Approved tours (15 wins total)
  - PGA Tour
  - European Tour
  - Japan Golf Tour
  - Sunshine Tour
  - Asian Tour
  - PGA Tour of Australasia
- Majors or Players Championship (two wins)
  - Masters Tournament
  - U.S. Open
  - The Open Championship
  - PGA Championship
  - The Players Championship

==== Female ====
- Approved tours (15 wins total)
  - LPGA Tour
  - Ladies European Tour
  - LPGA of Japan Tour
  - LPGA of Korea Tour
  - ALPG Tour
- Majors (two wins)
  - U.S. Women's Open
  - Women's PGA Championship
  - The Women's Open Championship (2001−current)
  - Chevron Championship (1983−current; formerly known as the Dinah Shore, Kraft Nabisco Championship, and ANA Inspiration)
  - The Evian Championship (2013−current)
  - du Maurier Classic (1979−2000)
  - Titleholders Championship (1937-1966, 1972)
  - Women's Western Open (1930-1967)

=== Categories from 1996 to 2013 ===
From 1996 to 2013, members were inducted into the Hall of Fame in one of five categories: PGA Tour/Champions Tour, LPGA Tour, International, Lifetime Achievement, and Veterans.

==== PGA Tour/Champions Tour ballot ====
Current and former PGA Tour and Champions Tour players were eligible for this ballot if they met the following requirements (beginning with 1996 election):

- PGA Tour
  - Minimum of 40 years old
  - PGA Tour member for 10 years
  - 10 PGA Tour wins or two wins in the majors or Players Championship
- Champions Tour
  - Champions Tour member for five years
  - 20 wins between PGA Tour and Champions Tour or five wins in the majors (regular or senior) or Players Championship

Election requirements:

| Years | % of returned ballots needed for election |
|---|---|
| 1996–2000 | 75% |
| 2001–2003 | 65% |
| 2004–2013 | 65%, in the event that no candidate receives 65%, the nominee receiving the most votes with at least 50% is elected |

Voters voted for up to 30% of the players on the ballot. If a player was named on less than 5% of the ballots for two consecutive years, they were dropped from the ballot. Players not elected could remain on the ballot indefinitely (prior to 2007 the limit was 10 years, from 2007 to 2009 the limit was 15 years).

==== LPGA point system ====
LPGA Tour golfers were eligible through a point system. Since 1999, LPGA members automatically qualified for World Golf Hall of Fame membership when they meet these three criteria:

1. Must be/have been an "active" LPGA Tour member for 10 years.
2. Must have won/been awarded at least one of the following – an LPGA major championship, the Vare Trophy or Player of the Year honors; and
3. Must have accumulated a total of 27 points, which are awarded as follows – one point for each LPGA official tournament win, two points for each LPGA major tournament win and one point for each Vare Trophy or Rolex Player of the Year honor earned.

Before 1999, players had to win 30 tournaments, including two majors; 35 tournaments with one major; or 40 tournaments in all to automatically qualify. At one time, players had to win two different majors to qualify with 30 wins, but this was changed earlier in the 1990s.

This point system is still used for selection to the LPGA Hall of Fame. However, in March 2022, the ten-year requirement was scrapped, and a point for winning an Olympic gold medal was added to the criteria.

==== International ballot ====
Men and women golfers not fully eligible for PGA/Champions Tour ballot or the LPGA Tour point system were eligible for the International ballot if they met the following requirements (beginning with the 1996 election):

- Minimum of 40 years old
- Cumulative 50 points earned as follows:
  - Men
    - 6 points – Major victories
    - 4 points – Players Championship win
    - 3 points – Other PGA Tour win, European Tour win
    - 2 points – Japan Golf Tour, Sunshine Tour, PGA Tour of Australasia, Champions Tour win
    - 1 point – Other national championship win; Ryder Cup, Presidents Cup participation
  - Women
    - 6 points – Major (Note: This specifically refers to events recognized as majors by the U.S. LPGA. The three richest women's tours each recognize a different set of majors, although the U.S. LPGA set is by far the most significant on a global scale. See women's major golf championships for a fuller discussion.) victories
    - 4 points – Other LPGA Tour win, Women's British Open win prior to 2001 (Note: The Women's British Open was first recognized as a U.S. LPGA major in 2001.)
    - 2 points – LPGA of Japan Tour win, Ladies European Tour win
    - 1 point – Other national championship win, Solheim Cup participation

Election requirements: same as PGA Tour ballot.

==== Lifetime Achievement category ====
There was also a "lifetime achievement" category through which anyone who had made a major contribution to the organization or promotion of the sport may be selected, for example, Bob Hope. These members were chosen by the Hall of Fame's Board of Directors. Most played golf, in some cases with some competitive success, but it was not their play alone which won them a place in the Hall of Fame.

==== Veteran's category ====
The last category was created to honor professional or amateur players whose career concluded at least 30 years ago. These members were also chosen by the Hall of Fame's Board of Directors.

== Membership ==
New members are inducted each year on the Monday before The Players Championship (previous to 2010 in October or November), and by May 2013 there were 146 members. Beginning in 2010, the ballots are due in July with the results announced later in the year. New entrants in the Lifetime Achievement and Veteran's categories are announced at irregular intervals. For example, Frank Chirkinian was elected in the Lifetime Achievement category in an emergency election in February 2011, with the vote presumably held because he was then terminally ill with lung cancer; when it became clear he would not live to attend his induction, he videotaped his acceptance speech in late February, less than two weeks before his death.

=== Men ===
Unless stated otherwise these men were inducted mainly for their on-course success. The exceptions mostly correspond with the lifetime achievement category, but not quite. For example, Charlie Sifford was notable as a player but was inducted for lifetime achievement.

- 1974 (United States) Walter Hagen
- 1974 (United States) Ben Hogan
- 1974 (United States) Bobby Jones
- 1974 (United States) Byron Nelson
- 1974 (United States) Jack Nicklaus
- 1974 (United States) Francis Ouimet
- 1974 (United States) Arnold Palmer
- 1974 (South Africa) Gary Player
- 1974 (United States) Gene Sarazen
- 1974 (United States) Sam Snead
- 1974 (Jersey) Harry Vardon
- 1975 (Scotland) Willie Anderson
- 1975 (United States) Fred Corcoran – many-faceted promoter and administrator
- 1975 (United States) Joseph Dey – executive director of the USGA and the first commissioner of the PGA Tour
- 1975 (United States) Chick Evans
- 1975 (Scotland) Young Tom Morris
- 1975 (England) John Henry Taylor
- 1976 (Scotland) (United States) Tommy Armour
- 1976 (Scotland) James Braid
- 1976 (Scotland) Old Tom Morris
- 1976 (United States) Jerome Travers
- 1977 (South Africa) Bobby Locke
- 1977 (England) John Ball
- 1977 (United States) Herb Graffis – golf writer and founder of the U.S. National Golf Foundation
- 1977 (Scotland) Donald Ross – golf course architect
- 1978 (United States) Billy Casper
- 1978 (England) Harold Hilton
- 1978 (United States) Bing Crosby – celebrity friend of golf who founded his own PGA Tour event
- 1978 (United States) Clifford Roberts – co-founder of the Augusta National Golf Club and the Masters Tournament
- 1979 (United States) Walter Travis
- 1980 (England) Henry Cotton
- 1980 (United States) Lawson Little
- 1981 (United States) Ralph Guldahl
- 1981 (United States) Lee Trevino
- 1982 (United States) Julius Boros
- 1983 (United States) Jimmy Demaret
- 1983 (United States) Bob Hope – celebrity friend of golf who founded his own PGA Tour event
- 1986 (United States) Cary Middlecoff
- 1987 (United States) Robert Trent Jones – golf course architect
- 1988 (United States) Bob Harlow – promoter who played a key role in the early development of the PGA Tour
- 1988 (Australia) Peter Thomson
- 1988 (United States) Tom Watson
- 1989 (England) Jim Barnes
- 1989 (Argentina) Roberto De Vicenzo
- 1989 (United States) Raymond Floyd
- 1990 (United States) William C. Campbell – two-time President of the USGA
- 1990 (United States) Gene Littler
- 1990 (United States) Paul Runyan
- 1990 (United States) Horton Smith
- 1992 (United States) Harry Cooper
- 1992 (United States) Hale Irwin
- 1992 (Puerto Rico) Chi-Chi Rodríguez
- 1992 (United States) Richard Tufts – ran Pinehurst and served as President of the USGA
- 1996 (United States) Johnny Miller
- 1997 (Spain) Seve Ballesteros
- 1997 (England) Nick Faldo
- 1998 (United States) Lloyd Mangrum
- 2000 (United States) Jack Burke Jr.
- 2000 (United States) Deane Beman – Commissioner of the PGA Tour 1974-1994
- 2000 (England) Michael Bonallack – British golf administrator
- 2000 (England) Neil Coles – first Chairman of the PGA European Tour
- 2000 (England) John Jacobs – first Tournament Director of the European Tour
- 2001 (Germany) Bernhard Langer (inducted with 2002 class)
- 2001 (Australia) Greg Norman
- 2001 (United States) Payne Stewart
- 2001 (Scotland) Allan Robertson
- 2001 (United States) Karsten Solheim – golf equipment manufacturer and founder of the Solheim Cup
- 2002 (United States) Ben Crenshaw
- 2002 (England) Tony Jacklin
- 2002 (United States) Tommy Bolt
- 2002 (United States) Harvey Penick – golf instructor
- 2003 (Zimbabwe) Nick Price
- 2003 (United States) Leo Diegel
- 2004 (United States) Charlie Sifford
- 2004 (Japan) Isao Aoki
- 2004 (United States) Tom Kite
- 2005 (England) Bernard Darwin – golf writer
- 2005 (England) Alister MacKenzie – golf course architect
- 2005 (Scotland) Willie Park Sr.
- 2005 (Fiji) Vijay Singh (inducted with 2006 class)
- 2006 (United States) Larry Nelson
- 2006 (United States) Henry Picard
- 2006 (United States) Mark McCormack – sports agent who represented many top golfers; the developer of golf's first world ranking system, adapted into today's Official World Golf Ranking
- 2007 (Republic of Ireland) Joe Carr
- 2007 (United States) Hubert Green
- 2007 (United States) Charles B. Macdonald – inaugural U.S. Amateur champion, founding Vice-President of the USGA and "Father of American Golf Architecture"
- 2007 (Australia) Kel Nagle
- 2007 (United States) Curtis Strange
- 2008 (New Zealand) Bob Charles
- 2008 (United States) Pete Dye – golf course architect
- 2008 (United States) Denny Shute
- 2008 (United States) Herbert Warren Wind – golf writer
- 2008 (United States) Craig Wood
- 2009 (Republic of Ireland) Christy O'Connor Snr
- 2009 (Spain) José María Olazábal
- 2009 (United States) Lanny Wadkins
- 2009 (United States) Dwight D. Eisenhower – former U.S. President
- 2011 (South Africa) Ernie Els
- 2011 (Japan) Masashi "Jumbo" Ozaki
- 2011 (United States) Doug Ford
- 2011 (Scotland) (United States) Jock Hutchison
- 2011 (United States) Frank Chirkinian – television producer, known as the 'father of televised golf' for the impact he had on golf broadcasting.
- 2011 (United States) George H. W. Bush – former U.S. President
- 2012 (United States) Phil Mickelson
- 2012 (United States) Dan Jenkins – golf writer
- 2012 (Scotland) Sandy Lyle
- 2012 (England) Peter Alliss
- 2013 (United States) Fred Couples
- 2013 (United States) Ken Venturi
- 2013 (Scotland) Willie Park Jr.
- 2013 (Scotland) Colin Montgomerie
- 2013 (Scotland) Ken Schofield – Executive Director of the European Tour
- 2015 (Australia) David Graham
- 2015 (United States) Mark O'Meara
- 2015 (United States) A. W. Tillinghast – golf course architect
- 2017 (England) Henry Longhurst – golf writer and commentator
- 2017 (United States) Davis Love III
- 2017 (Wales) Ian Woosnam
- 2019 (South Africa) Retief Goosen
- 2019 (United States) Billy Payne − Chairman of Augusta National Golf Club
- 2019 (United States) Dennis Walters − disabled golfer and inspirational speaker and performer
- 2021 (United States) Tiger Woods
- 2021 (United States) Tim Finchem – Commissioner of the PGA Tour 1994–2017
- 2023 (United States) Johnny Farrell
- 2023 (Republic of Ireland) Pádraig Harrington
- 2023 (United States) Tom Weiskopf

=== Women ===
The first five women on this list were grandfathered in 1998 from the Hall of Fame of Women's Golf, which was founded in 1951, via the LPGA Tour Hall of Fame, which was inaugurated in 1967. The list shows the years when they were originally inducted into the Hall of Fame of Women's Golf. Unless stated otherwise the women on the list were inducted primarily for their on-course achievements. Players marked with an (f) denotes they were elected twice—once individually, and once collectively for the 2024 nominations announced on March 8, 2023 for the 13 LPGA founders.

- 1951 (United States) Betty Jameson (f)
- 1951 (United States) Patty Berg (f)
- 1951 (United States) Louise Suggs (f)
- 1951 (United States) Babe Didrikson Zaharias (f)
- 1960 (United States) Betsy Rawls
- 1964 (United States) Mickey Wright
- 1975 (United States) Glenna Collett-Vare
- 1975 (England) Joyce Wethered
- 1975 (United States) Kathy Whitworth
- 1977 (United States) Sandra Haynie
- 1977 (United States) Carol Mann
- 1978 (Scotland) (United States) Dorothy Campbell Hurd Howe
- 1982 (United States) JoAnne Carner
- 1987 (United States) Nancy Lopez
- 1991 (United States) Pat Bradley
- 1993 (United States) Patty Sheehan
- 1994 (United States) Dinah Shore – celebrity friend of the LPGA; founded a tournament that eventually became a major
- 1995 (United States) Betsy King
- 1999 (United States) Amy Alcott
- 2000 (United States) Beth Daniel
- 2000 (United States) Juli Inkster
- 2000 (United States) Judy Rankin
- 2001 (United States) Donna Caponi
- 2001 (United States) Judy Bell – administrator; first female President of the USGA
- 2002 (United States) Marlene Bauer Hagge (f)
- 2003 (Japan) Hisako "Chako" Higuchi
- 2003 (Sweden) Annika Sörenstam
- 2004 (Canada) Marlene Stewart Streit
- 2005 (Japan) Ayako Okamoto
- 2005 (Australia) Karrie Webb
- 2006 (United States) Marilynn Smith (f)
- 2007 (South Korea) Pak Se-ri
- 2008 (United States) Carol Semple Thompson
- 2012 (United States) Hollis Stacy
- 2015 (England) Laura Davies
- 2017 (United States) Meg Mallon
- 2017 (Mexico) Lorena Ochoa
- 2019 (United States) Peggy Kirk Bell
- 2019 (Australia) Jan Stephenson
- 2021 (United States) Marion Hollins
- 2021 (United States) Susie Maxwell Berning
- 2023 (United States) Beverly Hanson
- 2023 (United States) Sandra Palmer
- 2023 LPGA Founders (those not previously in Hall listed):
  - (United States) Alice Bauer
  - (United States) Bettye Danoff
  - (United States) Helen Dettweiler
  - (United States) Helen Hicks
  - (United States) Opal Hill
  - (United States) Sally Sessions
  - (United States) Shirley Spork

== See also ==
- Canadian Golf Hall of Fame – Sports museum in Oakville, Ontario, Canada
- Jack Nicklaus Museum – American sports museum in Columbus, Ohio, USA
- R&A World Golf Museum – Sports museum in Fife, Scotland, United Kingdom
- USGA Museum – Sports museum in Liberty Corner, New Jersey
