= Master of the Gardens of Love =

The Master of the Gardens of Love (fl. ca. 1430-1440/45) was a Netherlandish engraver. One of the earliest practitioners of copper engraving, his name is derived from a pair of depictions of Gardens of Love. He may have worked in the northern Netherlands, around The Hague. His surviving output is small; only about twenty-six engravings are attributed to his hand, and of these a handful are as yet unauthenticated. With a single exception, all are unique impressions. Their small format indicates that they may have been used as illustrations for manuscripts, or possibly as models for miniatures. The technique is crude, displaying strong outlines and heavy hatching, often cross-hatching. The figures are characterised by their angularity and stiffness.
