= Baird baronets of Newbyth (second creation, 1809) =

Escutcheon of the Baird baronets of Newbyth, in a recorded form referencing the Order of the Crescent

The Baird baronetcy of Newbyth, second creation, in the County of Haddington, was created in the Baronetage of the United Kingdom on 13 April 1809 for the soldier David Baird, grandson of William Baird, a younger son of Sir Robert Baird, 1st Baronet, of Saughtonhall. His father, William Baird, had inherited the Newbyth estate in 1745 on the death of Sir John Baird, 2nd Baronet, of the 1680 creation. The baronetcy was created with remainder to Baird's elder brother Robert Baird and the heirs male of his body. Sir David Baird died childless and was succeeded, according to the special remainder by his nephew David Baird, the second Baronet. At the death of the 6th Baronet in 2022, his fourth cousin, Sir Andrew James Baird became the 7th Baronet in April 2023.

== Baird baronets, of Newbyth; second creation (1809) ==
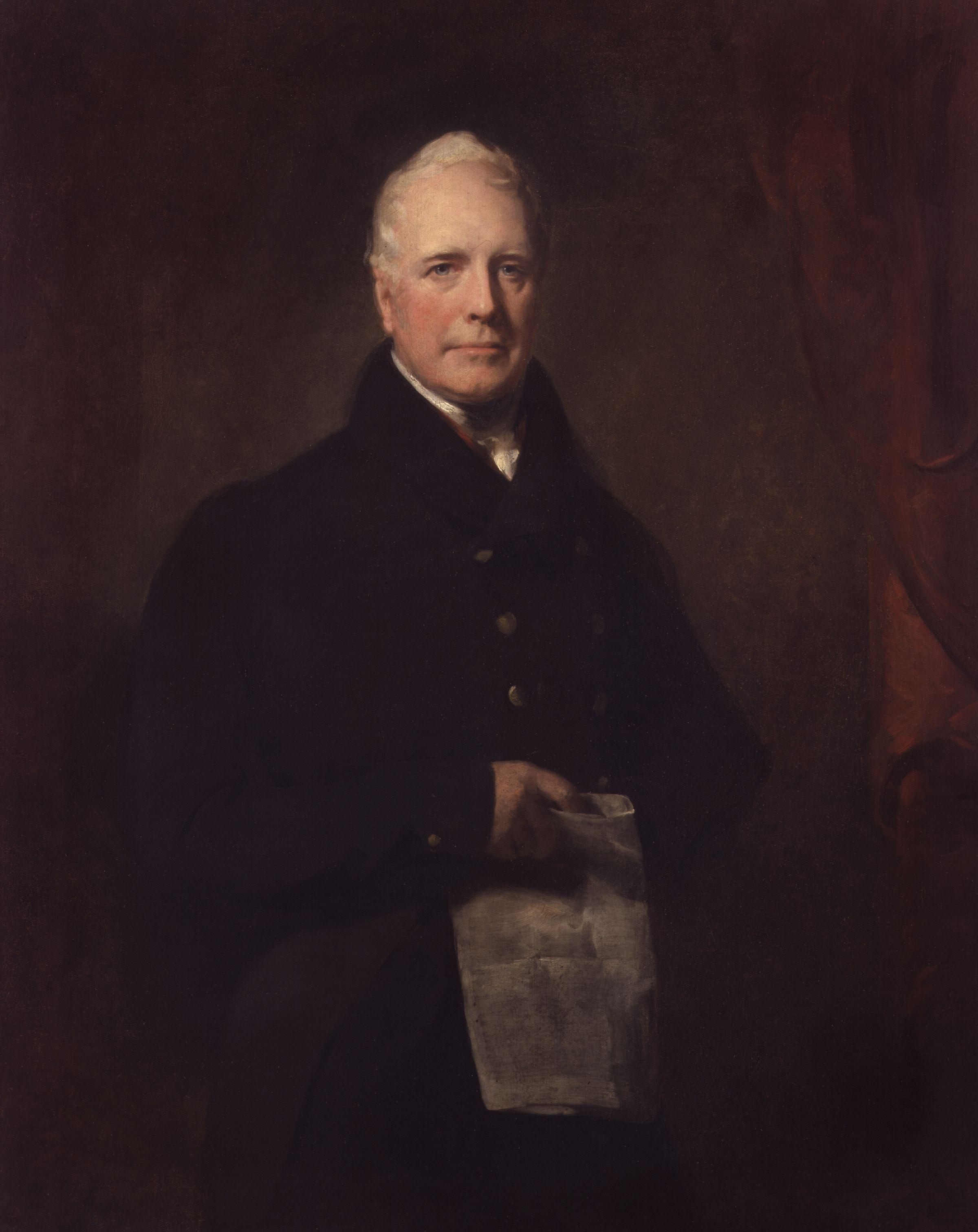
Sir David Baird, 1st Bt. of the second Newbyth creation

- Sir David Baird, 1st Baronet, GCB, 1st Baronet (1757–1829)
- Sir David Baird, 2nd Baronet (1795–1852)
- Sir David Baird, 3rd Baronet, DL (1832 – 12 October 1913)
- Sir David Baird, 4th Baronet, MVO, 4th Baronet (1865–1941)
- Sir David Charles Baird, 5th Baronet (1912–2000)
- Sir Charles William Stuart Baird, 6th Baronet (1939–2022)
- Sir Andrew James Baird, 7th Baronet (born 1970), current holder.

The heir apparent is Jago David Baird (born 2006), only son of the present holder.

== Notes ==
Baronetage of the United Kingdom
Preceded by Hood baronets	Baird baronets of Newbyth; 13 April 1809	Succeeded by Seymour baronets
