= Sir David Baird, 2nd Baronet =

British baronet and captain in the British army

Captain Sir David Baird Bt

Personal details
- Born: 1795 Newbyth, Haddington
- Died: 8 January 1852 (aged 56–57)
- Spouse: Lady Anne Kennedy (m. 1821; died 1852)
- Children: 10

Military service
- Allegiance: United Kingdom
- Branch/service: British Army
- Rank: Captain

Sir David Baird, 2nd Baronet, of Newbyth (1795 – 8 January 1852) was a British baronet and captain in the British Army.

== Early life ==
David Baird was born in 1795, the son of Robert Baird and Hersey Christina Maria Gavin.

His paternal grandparents were Alicia (née Johnston) Baird and Edinburgh merchant, William Baird of Newbyth (himself a grandson of Sir Robert Baird, 3rd Baronet, of Saughtonhall, and cousin and heir of Sir John Baird, 2nd Baronet, of Newbyth).

== Career ==
Baird was a Captain in the British Army.

On 18 August 1829, he succeeded his uncle, David Baird, to the Baird baronetcy of Newbyth House, Haddingtonshire. It was the second creation of the Baird baronetcy of Newbyth, the first creation was in 1680 and became extinct upon the death of Sir John Baird, Bt in 1745. The second creation, for his uncle, was created in 1809.

== Personal life ==
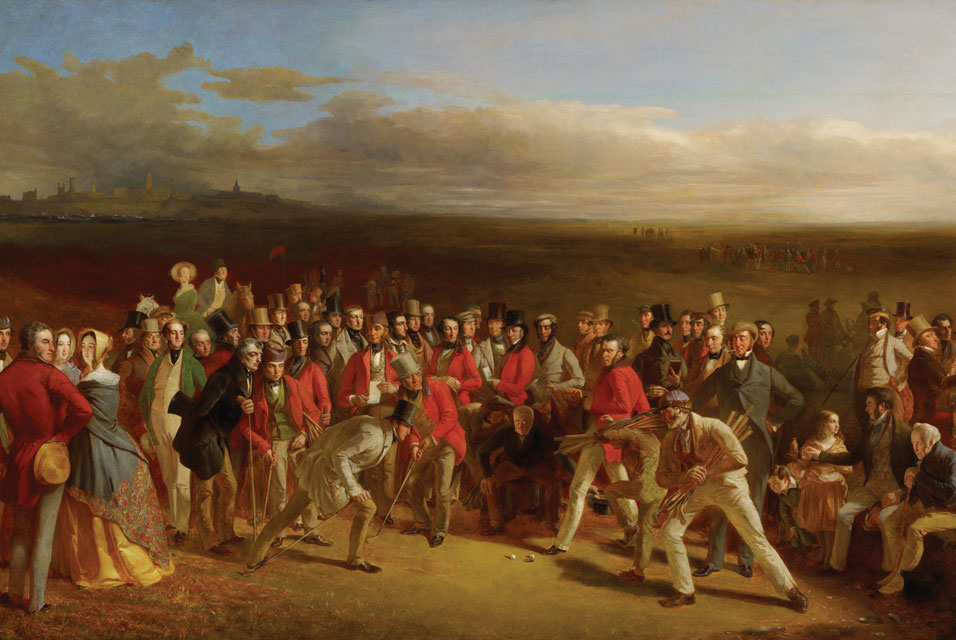
Baird is one of the prominent figures in The Golfers by Charles Lees, 1847

On 10 August 1821 he married Lady Anne Kennedy (1797–1877), daughter of Sir Archibald Kennedy, 1st Marquess of Ailsa and Margaret Erskine of Dun. Together, they had ten children:

- Alice Anne Baird (d. 1908), who married Rev. Hon. Arthur Charles Baillie-Hamilton, son of George Baillie-Hamilton, 10th Earl of Haddington.
- Robert Wynne Baird (d. 1845).
- Archibald Baird (d. 1845), who died unmarried.
- Hersey Maria Christina Elizabeth (d. 1908), who died unmarried.
- Margaret Baird (c. 1831–1903), who married Lord Gilbert Kennedy, son of Archibald Kennedy, Earl of Cassillis.
- Sir David Baird, 3rd Baronet (1832–1913), who married the Hon. Ellen Stuart, a daughter of Charles Stuart, 12th Lord Blantyre and Lady Evelyn Sutherland-Leveson-Gower (a daughter of the 2nd Duke of Sutherland).
- Adm. Sir John Erskine Kennedy Baird (1833–1908), who married Constance Barbara Clarke, but died without issue.
- Capt. William Arthur Baird (b. 1839), who served in the 42nd Highlanders and fought in the Ashanti Wars, dying from wounds sustained; he died unmarried.
- Capt. Frederick Baird (1841–1884), who served as a Lieutenant in the 6th Foot Regiment, and as a Captain in the Haddington Militia; he died unmarried.
- Jonathan Peel Baird (1844–1915), named in honor of his uncle Jonathan Peel Secretary of State for War (who married his aunt, Lady Alicia Jane Kennedy); he married Emily Diana Frances Maude, a daughter of Col. Sir George Ashley Maude.

Sir David died on 8 January 1852 following an injury from his horse while with Lord Elcho's hounds in Berwickshire.

Baronetage of the United Kingdom
| Preceded by David Baird | Baronet (of Newbyth); 1829–1852 | Succeeded by David Baird |
