= Richard Horton =

Richard Horton may refer to:

- Richard Horton (editor) (born 1961), chief editor of The Lancet
- Richard Horton (blogger) (born 1964), police blogger
- Dick Horton (Richard J. Horton, born 1949), American golf administrator

== See also ==
- Richard Horton O'Dwyer (1858–1922), Newfoundland politician
