= Mack P. Brothers Jr. =

Mack P. Brothers Jr. (1911–1984) was an American businessman and amateur golfer from Nashville, Tennessee, widely recognized for his role in the development of golf in Tennessee during the mid-20th century. He was once ranked by Golf Digest among the top five senior amateur players in the United States. As president of the Tennessee Golf Association (TGA), he played a central role in establishing the Tennessee State Open and other key amateur golf events. From 1950 to 1970, Brothers was considered one of the most influential figures in Tennessee golf — his endorsement alone often ensured the success of a tournament. He was inducted into the Tennessee Golf Hall of Fame in 2016.

== Early life and business career ==
Brothers was born in Rutherford County, Tennessee, (near Nashville). He learned to play golf at Clarksville Country Club under professional Henry Livingstone, the brother of George Livingstone, the pro at Belle Meade Country Club in Nashville. In his youth, Brothers sustained a severe injury to his left arm, resulting in a permanent deformity. He was riding in a car with his arm out the window when the car was sideswiped by a truck. The fractured elbow healed with an angular deformity and restricted motion, but it did not prevent him from developing a near-perfect golf swing. “It was set up perfectly for a putter,” joked George Creagh, a protégé and frequent playing partner. “His left arm pointed toward the hole... he was an excellent putter.” Brothers became known as one of the straightest ball-strikers in Tennessee amateur golf.His injury was similar to an arm deformity of professional golfer Ed Furgol, winner of the 1954 U.S. Open.

He served as chairman and president of M.P. Brothers Co., a family enterprise involved in wholesale grocery distribution, supermarket retail, farming, and aviation. He entered the aviation business in the late 1950s. He was a partner in Big Brother Aircraft, a chartering company, aircraft distributor, and FAA-certified aircraft repair station in Nashville. Brothers flew a corporate plane to grocery stores he owned in Alabama. His brother was Russell White Brothers Sr., a Nashville civic leader and businessman. His wife, Sarah White Cunningham Brothers, died on February 8, 1980. He had four children: a daughter, Mrs. William Tucker; and three sons, Mack P. Brothers III, Dr. John C. Brothers and Judge Thomas Brothers.

== Golf career ==
In 1944, Brothers won the Tennessee State Amateur Championship defeating Arthur MacDonald of Memphis, in the finals. Brothers competed in the tournament in 1941, but in the final round, lost to Cary Middlecoff. He later won two Tennessee State Senior Amateur titles and the 1969 Southern Senior Amateur Championship. He won the club championship ten times at his home club, Nashville's Belle Meade Country Club. According to the Tennessee Golf Hall of Fame, Brothers was ranked among the top five senior amateur golfers in the United States by Golf Digest. He was president of the Tennessee Golf Association in 1941, 1955, 1965, and 1975. Golf historian Gene Pearce said, "For twenty years, beginning in the 1950s, Brothers was the most influential golfer in Tennessee. His seal of approval generally meant success to a tournament." Brothers was called “the father of the Tennessee Open,” first played in 1949. He supplied the prize money and also made sure his private plane was available to shuttle competitors back and forth.

== Tournament wins ==
- Tennessee State Amateur Champion (1944)
- Two-time State Senior Amateur Champion
- Irvin Cobb Tournament (1943)
- 1969 Southern Senior Amateur Champion
- Ten-time club champion at Belle Meade Country Club (Nashville)

== Legacy ==
Brothers was described by author Gene Pearce as a "happy-go-lucky and gregarious" character who played hard on and off the course. He had the ability to make things happen where others could not. The 1984 Tennessee Open Golf Tournament was dedicated in his honor. Upon his passing, Tennessee Golf Hall-of-Fame member Lew Conner remarked, “Mack Brothers Jr. was a cornerstone of amateur golf in Tennessee. In my judgment, without Mack Brothers, the Tennessee Golf Association would not be where it is today. He was the father of our Tennessee State Open Championship and was its backbone, financially and otherwise, for many years. We will all miss him very much.” Brothers was inducted into the Tennessee Golf Hall of Fame in 2016.
