= Sir John Baird, 2nd Baronet =

Scottish politician

Arms: Gules a boar passant or, on a canton ermine a sword in pale proper.

Sir John Baird, 2nd Baronet, of Newbyth (13 October 1686 – 30 September 1745) of Newbyth, Haddington, was a Scottish politician who sat in the House of Commons from 1715 to 1722.

== Life ==
Baird was the eldest son of Sir William Baird who was the 2nd Baronet of the first baronetcy created for his father in 1660 and 1st Baronet of the second baronetcy created for himself in 1680. His mother was Helen Gilmour, daughter of Sir John Gilmour. He was educated at the University of Glasgow in 1702 and was awarded MA in 1706. He married Janet Dalrymple, only daughter of Sir David Dalrymple, 1st Baronet of Hailes, Haddington.

Baird was returned unopposed as Member of Parliament (MP) for Edinburghshire at the 1715 general election. He was appointed Commissioner of the equivalent in 1715 and held the post until 1719. He lost his seat at Edinburghshire when defeated in a contest at the 1722 general election. In 1737, he succeeded his father as baronet. When his cousin Sir Charles Gilmour had to stand at a by-election for Edinburgh when appointed to office in 1744, Baird decided to oppose him, but was unsuccessful.

Baird died aged 58 without issue at Berwick-upon-Tweed on 30 September 1745. With his death the baronetcy became extinct. The heir of his estates was his cousin William, the father of Sir David Baird, 1st Baronet. Baird's widow remarried James St Clair and died in 1766.

Parliament of Great Britain
Preceded by George Lockhart	Member of Parliament for Edinburghshire; 1715–1722	Succeeded by Robert Dundas
Baronetage of Nova Scotia
Preceded by William Baird	Baronet (of Newbyth); 1737–1745	Extinct
