= Hood baronets of Tidlake (1809) =

Escutcheon of the Fuller-Acland-Hood baronets of Tidlake

The Hood baronetcy, of Tidlake in the County of Surrey, was created in the Baronetage of the United Kingdom on 13 April 1809 for Admiral Samuel Hood (1762–1814). He was a younger son of Samuel Hood (1715–1805) of Kingsland in the parish of Netherbury, Dorset, a purser in the Royal Navy and first cousin of the 1st Viscount Hood and the 1st Viscount Bridport. The baronetcy was created with remainder to his nephew Alexander Hood (1793–1851) of Wootton House, Butleigh, Somerset, and the heirs male of his body.

== Family background ==
The 1st Baronet was the grandson of Alexander Hood (c.1675–1756) of Mosterton in Dorset (uncle of Samuel Hood, 1st Viscount Hood and Alexander Hood, 1st Viscount Bridport) by his wife, Ann Way. He was succeeded according to the special remainder by his nephew, the 2nd Baronet, who represented Somerset West in the House of Commons. His son, the 3rd Baronet, in 1849 married Isabel Harriet Fuller-Palmer-Acland, daughter and heiress of Sir Peregrine Fuller-Palmer-Acland, 2nd Baronet (died 1871), of Fairfield in Somerset, and assumed by royal licence the additional surnames of Fuller and Acland. Sir Peregrine Fuller-Palmer-Acland bought the estate of St Audries in the parish of West Quantoxhead, West Somerset, for his daughter Isabel and her husband. The 3rd Baronet later sat as a Member of Parliament for Somerset West.

His son, the 4th Baronet, succeeded in 1905 to the Bateman Baronetcy, of Hartington Hall, according to a special remainder in the letters patent. Fuller-Acland-Hood also represented Wellington, Somerset, in Parliament and held minor office from 1902 to 1905 in the Conservative government of Arthur Balfour. On 22 January 1911, he was created Baron St Audries, of St Audries in the County of Somerset, in the Peerage of the United Kingdom.

His son was Alexander Peregrine, the 2nd Baron, who in 1925 sold the estate of St Audries, though not the lordship of the manor, to W. A. Towler of Littleport in Cambridgeshire. The barony became extinct on 16 October 1971 upon the death of the second Baron, while the baronetcies are considered to have passed to the latter's cousin, the sixth Baronet, of Tidlake, and eighth Baronet, of Hartington Hall. He was the son of the younger son of the 3rd Baronet; he never, however, successfully proved his succession and was not on the Official Roll of the Baronetage. Upon his death in 1990, the titles were considered to have become either extinct or dormant. As of 2026, they are no longer officially listed by the Standing Council of the Baronetage.

== Hood, later Fuller-Acland-Hood baronets, of Tidlake, Surrey (1809) ==
- Sir Samuel Hood, 1st Baronet (1762–1814)
- Sir Alexander Hood, 2nd Baronet (1793–1851)
- Sir Alexander Bateman Perian Fuller-Acland-Hood, 3rd Baronet (1819–1892)
- Sir Alexander Fuller-Acland-Hood, 4th Baronet (1853–1917) (created Baron St Audries in 1911)

== Barons St Audries (1911) ==
Arms of Hood, Baron St Audries: Azure, a fret argent on a chief sable three crescents or, being a difference of arms of Hood, Viscount Bridport, with tinctures of chief inverted

- Alexander Fuller-Acland-Hood, 1st Baron St Audries (1853–1917)
- Alexander Peregrine Fuller-Acland-Hood, 2nd Baron St Audries (1893–1971)

== Hood, later Fuller-Acland-Hood baronets, of Tidlake, Surrey (1809; reverted) ==
- Sir William Acland Hood, 6th Baronet (1901–1990). He became an American citizen in 1926, and taught at Los Angeles City College.

== Notes ==
Baronetage of the United Kingdom
Preceded by Ouseley baronets	Hood baronets of Tidlake; 13 April 1809	Succeeded by Baird baronets
