= Lissa Bradford =

Collegiate Golf Coach and Golf Administrator)

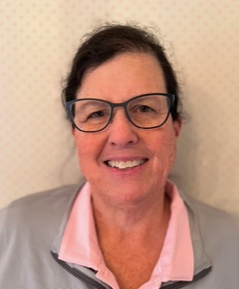
- Lissa Bradford, 2025
- Born: Melissa Hampton Bradford; October 23, 1962; Nashville, Tennessee, USA
- Education: The Harpeth Hall School; University of Alabama
- Occupations: Professional Golfer, Collegiate golf coach, Golf Administrator

Lissa Bradford (born Melissa Hampton Bradford, October 23, 1962), is an American PGA golf professional, golf administrator, and former collegiate golf coach and player who was inducted into the Tennessee Golf Hall of Fame in 2024. A two-time Tennessee Women’s Amateur champion, Bradford served for 29 years as Director of Junior Golf for the Tennessee Golf Foundation (TGF). The TGF's Junior Golf Academy was one of the first in the nation to organize youth summer golf camps which, as of 2018 had introduced more than 15,000 youngsters to the sport. Some campers grew up to be noted tour players including: Shaun Micheel (2003 PGA Championship); David Gossett (US Amateur winner and PGA Tour winner); and Blades Brown who at age 16 broke Bobby Jones' record as the youngest medalist at stroke play in U.S. Amateur history. Bradford received the Tennessee PGA Distinguished Career Award in 2024.

Concurrently with her junior golf career, Bradford was head coach of Belmont University’s women’s golf team for nearly two decades (2001–2020), and is credited for transforming the Bruins into perennial NCAA golf contenders. She received awards by the Women’s Golf Coaches Association’s (WGCA) and the National Golf Coaches Association (NGCA). She served on the NCAA Women’s Golf Committee and the rules committee for championship events.

== Early career ==
Born in Nashville, Bradford grew up in a golfing family. Her mother, also called "Lissa", was a ten-time club champion at Belle Meade Country Club and was a member the Vanderbilt Alumni Athletic Committee credited with adding golf and soccer to the list of women's sports at Vanderbilt. In high school at Nashville's Harpeth Hall School, the daughter Bradford won the TSSAA State Championship as a senior. She was later inducted into Harpeth Hall's Athletic Hall of Fame (1981).

She attended the University of Alabama where she was captain of the golf team for two years (1984,1985) and made the Southeastern Conference All-Academic team. During this time, she won two Tennessee Women's Amateur Titles (1983,1985), and qualified for the U.S. Women's Amateur in 1983.

Before turning pro, her last amateur tournament was in 1986 defending her Tennessee Women's Golf Association title. Bradford received her PGA Class A membership in 1989, and would in 2024 receive the "Quarter Century" award by the Association. While evaluating the prospect of becoming a tour player versus being a teaching pro or in the business end of golf, she gained experience by working as an assistant pro at various country clubs. These included Nashville's Belle Meade Country Club, the Gaylord Springs Golf Club, the Dallas Country Club and the Gleneagles Country Club in Plano, Texas with Will Brewer, former Nashville pro.

== Tennessee Golf Foundation ==
In 1995, Bradford became Director of the Junior Golf Program at the Tennessee Golf Foundation (TGF) dedicating much of her career to its development with assistance from colleagues Dick Horton and Vince Gill. Bradford said, "I loved the opportunity to grow the game for kids from age 4 up to college age, and to provide the golf opportunities I wish I'd had growing up". Tennessee's junior golf program had humble beginnings in 1973. It started as a small summer camp for youngsters to learn golf at a state park. With skillful fundraising, the program grew; the TGF acquired land and eventually built a sprawling golf complex in Franklin, Tennessee. As of 2024, it included a par three golf course, a 64 bed dormitory and dining hall for junior campers; also administrative facilities at The Golf House Tennessee. Tennessee’s Junior Golf Academy has hosted more than 15,000 graduates, including these young campers: Shaun Micheel (2003 PGA Championship); David Gossett (US Amateur winner and PGA Tour winner); and Blades Brown who at age 16 broke Bobby Jones' record as the youngest medalist at stroke play in U.S. Amateur history. Musician Vince Gill raised over $8 million for junior golf by hosting an annual golf tournament, "The Vinny Pro-Celebrity Golf Invitational."

Bradford was honored with the PGA’s 2024 Distinguished Career Award, recognizing her significant contributions to junior golf. In December 2019, she also received the Women's Golf Coaches Association's (WGCA) Kim Evans Award for her dedication to the game through teaching, coaching, and community involvement. Bradford was inducted into the Tennessee Golf Hall of Fame in 2024.

== Belmont University ==
While managing the junior golf program, Bradford took on an additional job in 2001 as head women's golf coach at Belmont University, a position she held for nearly two decades. She was the program's third head coach. By the time of her retirement in 2020, Belmont had become established as a major contender in college golf. She led them to six championships, 12 individual titles, and consistent top-six finishes in conference tournaments. Her players achieved academic honors, including 15 All-American Scholar honors and a 12-year streak of NCAA APR Recognition Awards. In 2010, she received the Gladys Palmer Meritorious Service Award, the (NGCA) Women's Golf Coaches Association's most prestigious honor.

== NCAA ==
In 2011, she began a term as a member of the NCAA Women's Golf Committee Competition Liaison. She continued her work with the NCAA on setting rules for NCAA regional and national championship events.

== Awards and honors ==
- 1997 & 1998 TPGA National Junior Golf Leader Award
- 2010 WGCA Gladys Palmer Meritorious Service Award
- 2018 Harpeth Hall Athletic Hall of Fame
- 2019 the PGA Kim Evans Award
- 2019 Tennessee Section PGA Bill Strausbaugh Award
- 2024 PGA Distinguished Career Award
- 2024 Tennessee Golf Hall of Fame
- Special Olympics golf rules Official
