= Tennessee Golf Hall of Fame =

Non-profit corporation

Coordinates: 35.9524°N 86.8452°W

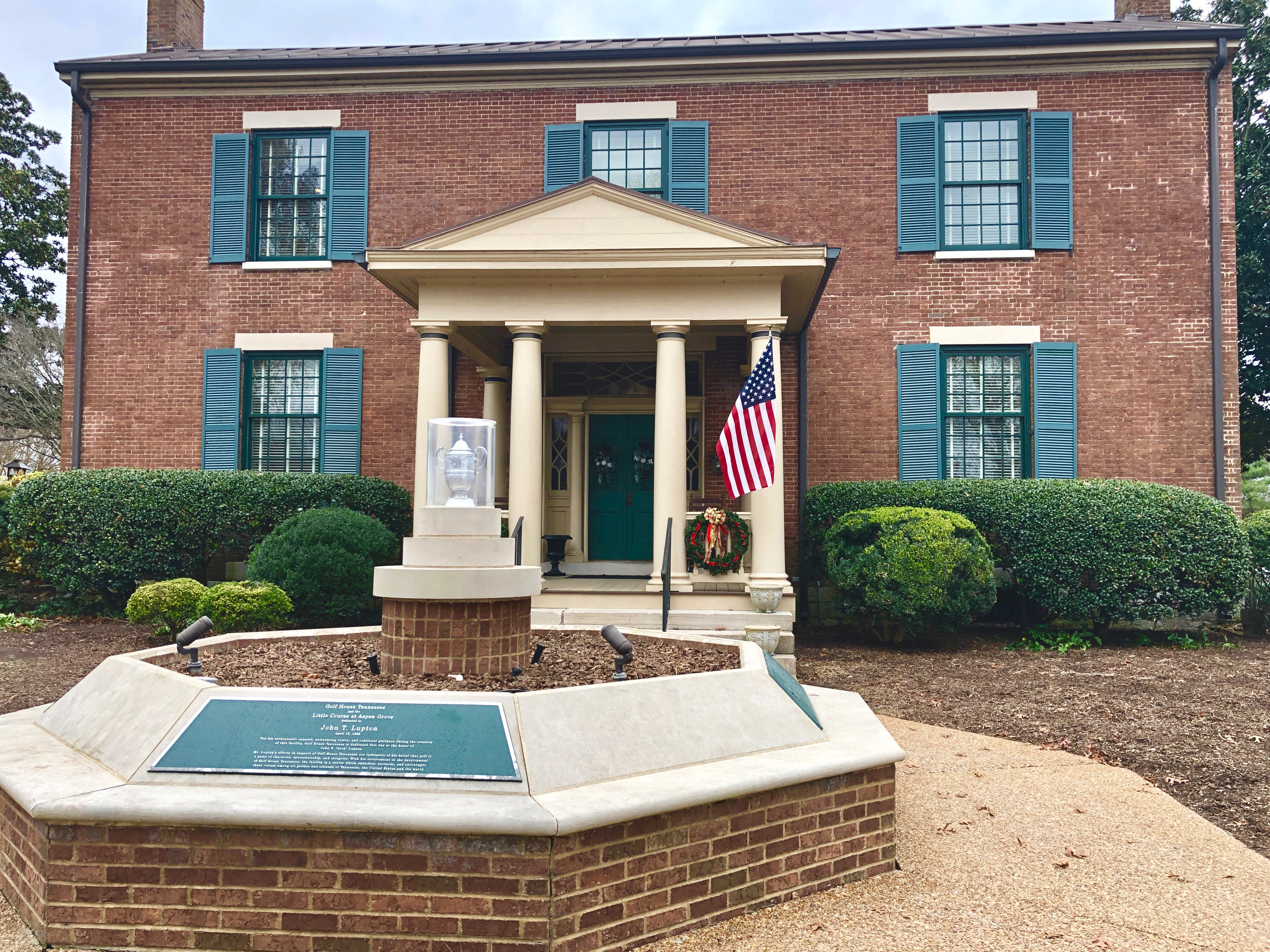
Tennessee Golf Hall of Fame at Golf House Tennessee, Franklin, 2018

The Tennessee Golf Hall of Fame is a non-profit corporation established in 1991 by the Tennessee Golf Foundation. The hall of fame is located at the Golf House Tennessee a 21,000 square foot golf complex in Franklin, Tennessee (near Nashville), which houses administration all of the state's golf activities, including pro golf, amateur golf, women's golf, junior golf, and turfgrass research."

Induction in to the hall of fame includes one or more of the following criteria for Tennesseans:

- a significant record as a championship player
- a benefactor, promoter, administrator, or volunteer for the game
- one who embodies the core values and honorable traditions of the game

Among the first inductees in 1992 were Lou Graham, Cary Middlecoff, Mason Rudolph. As of 2026, the hall included 60 members.

== Members ==
- 1991 – Lou Graham
- 1991 – Dudley "Waxo" Green
- 1991 – Cary Middlecoff
- 1991 – Lew Oehmig
- 1991 – Curtis Person, Sr.
- 1991 – Betty Probasco
- 1991 – Mason Rudolph
- 1995 – Gibby Gilbert
- 1995 – John T. "Jack" Lupton
- 1995 – Hillman Robbins
- 1995 – Judy Eller Street
- 1997 – Ted Rhodes
- 1999 – Harold Eller
- 1999 – Sarah LeBrun Ingram
- 1999 – Don Malarkey
- 2002 – Pat Abbott
- 2002 – Ed Brantly
- 2002 – Polly Boyd
- 2002 – Marguerite Gaut
- 2002 – Katherine Graham
- 2002 – Margaret Gunther Lee
- 2002 – Emmett Spicer
- 2004 – Harry A. "Cotton" Berrier
- 2005 – Vince Gill
- 2006 – Loren Roberts
- 2006 – David Stone
- 2007 – Joe Campbell
- 2007 – Connie Day
- 2007 – Ann Baker Furrow
- 2007 – Bobby Greenwood
- 2009 – Danny Green
- 2009 – Tim Jackson
- 2009 – Beverly Eller Pearce
- 2010 – Lew Conner
- 2010 – Willie Gibbons
- 2010 – Bill Greene
- 2011 – David Meador
- 2012 – Joe Taggert
- 2015 – Edyth Duffield
- 2015 – Horace F. Smith
- 2015 – Gene Pearce
- 2015 – Maggie Scott
- 2016 – Mack P. Brothers Jr.
- 2016 – E. E. "Bubber" Johnson
- 2016 – Roy Moore
- 2016 – Marguerite Solomon
- 2017 – Mike Kaplan
- 2017 – Joe Kennedy
- 2017 – Toby Wilt
- 2018 – Jean St. Charles
- 2019 – Dick Horton
- 2022 – David Gossett
- 2022 – Shaun Micheel
- 2023 – Rob Long
- 2024 – Bill Garner III
- 2024 – Lissa Bradford
- 2025 – Mike Nixon
- 2025 – David Bronson Ingram
- 2026 – Mike Eller
- 2026 – Bob Wolcott
