= Sir David Baird, 3rd Baronet =

English army officer and landowner (1832–1913)

Sir David Baird Bt., DL
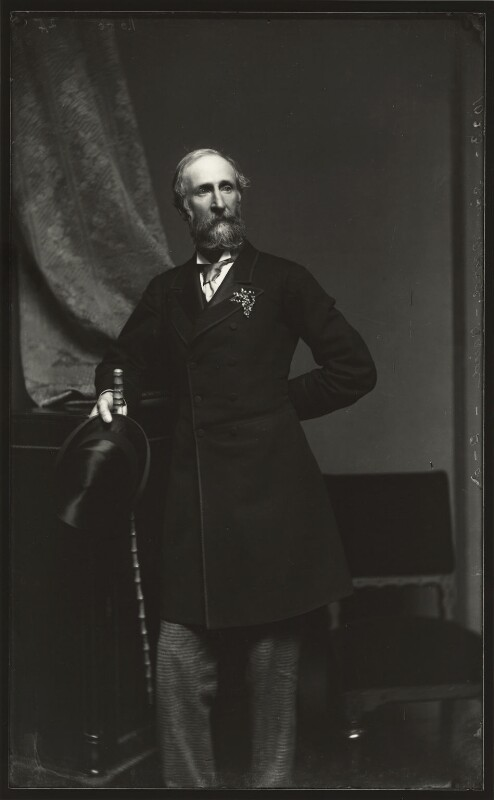
- Photographic portrait by Alexander Bassano (1870s)
- Born: 26 January 1832
- Died: 12 October 1913 (aged 81)
- Spouse: Lady Ellen Blantyre (m. 1864)
- Children: 6; including Sir David Baird, 4th Baronet, of Newbyth
- Military career
- Allegiance: United Kingdom
- Branch: British Army
- Rank: Major
- Conflicts: Xhosa Wars; Crimean War; Indian Mutiny

Sir David Baird, 3rd Baronet, of Newbyth, DL (26 January 1832 – 12 October 1913) was a Scottish army officer and landowner.

== Life ==
David Baird was born on 21 January 1832 in Prestonkirk, Haddingtonshire to Sir David Baird, 2nd Baronet, and Lady Anne Kennedy. He was baptised on 26 January. He succeeded his father in the baronetcy as the eldest surviving son in 1852.

Baird served as an officer with the 74th Regiment of Foot in the Xhosa Wars of 1851–1852, in the Crimean War, and was on Lord Clyde's staff during the Indian Mutiny. He was subsequently a captain in the 98th Regiment of Foot, and was promoted to be major in the 74th Highlanders.

Baird was a member of two famous London clubs: the Army and Navy Club, and White's Club. He was also Deputy Lieutenant for the counties of East Lothian and Midlothian.

Baird died at his Scottish residence at Preston Kirby, Haddingtonshire, on 12 October 1913, at the age of 81. He had been ill for some time, and on the Saturday prior underwent an operation. He is buried with his wife in Whitekirk graveyard in East Lothian.

== Family ==
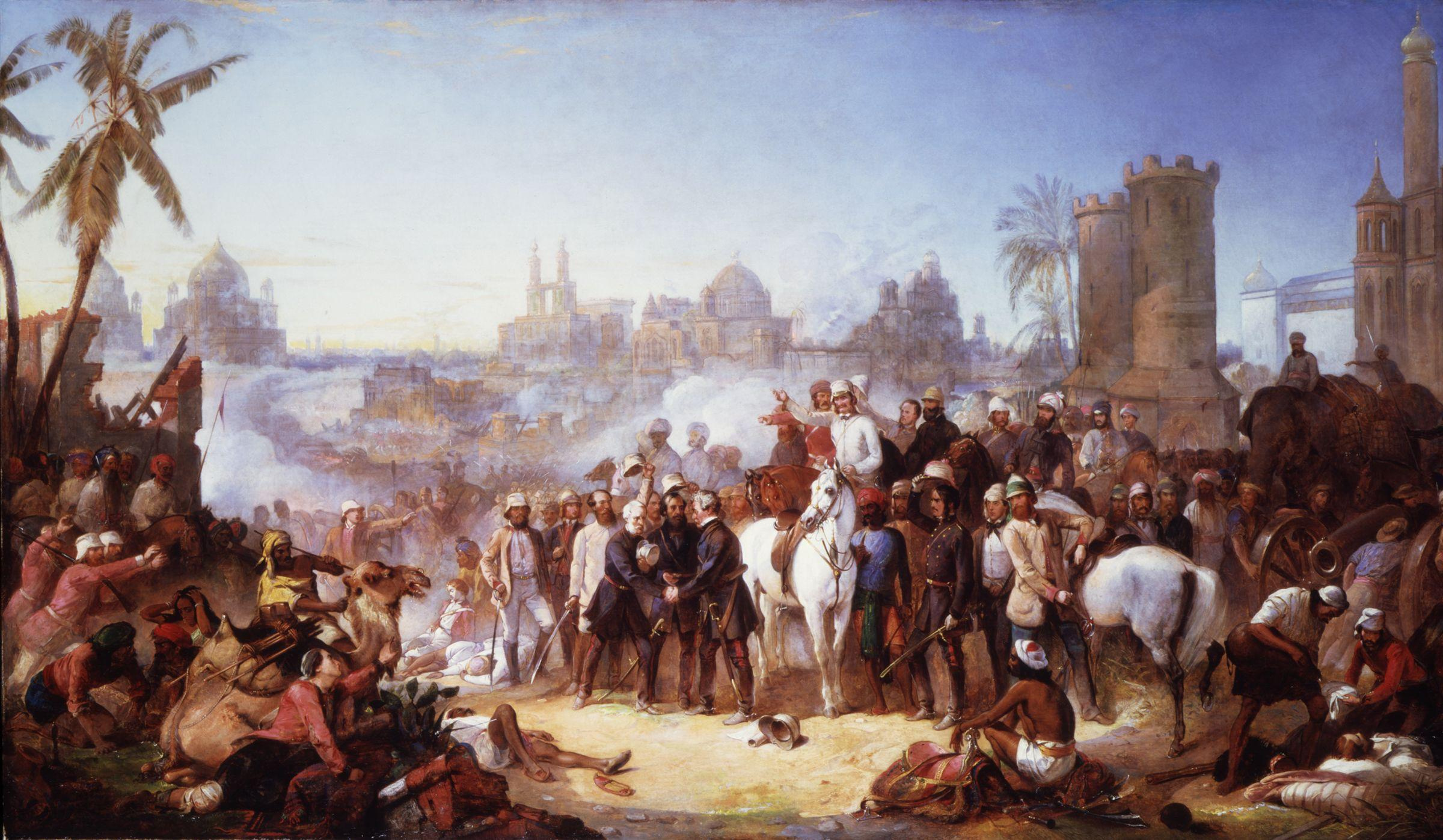
T. J. Barker, The Relief of Lucknow (1857)

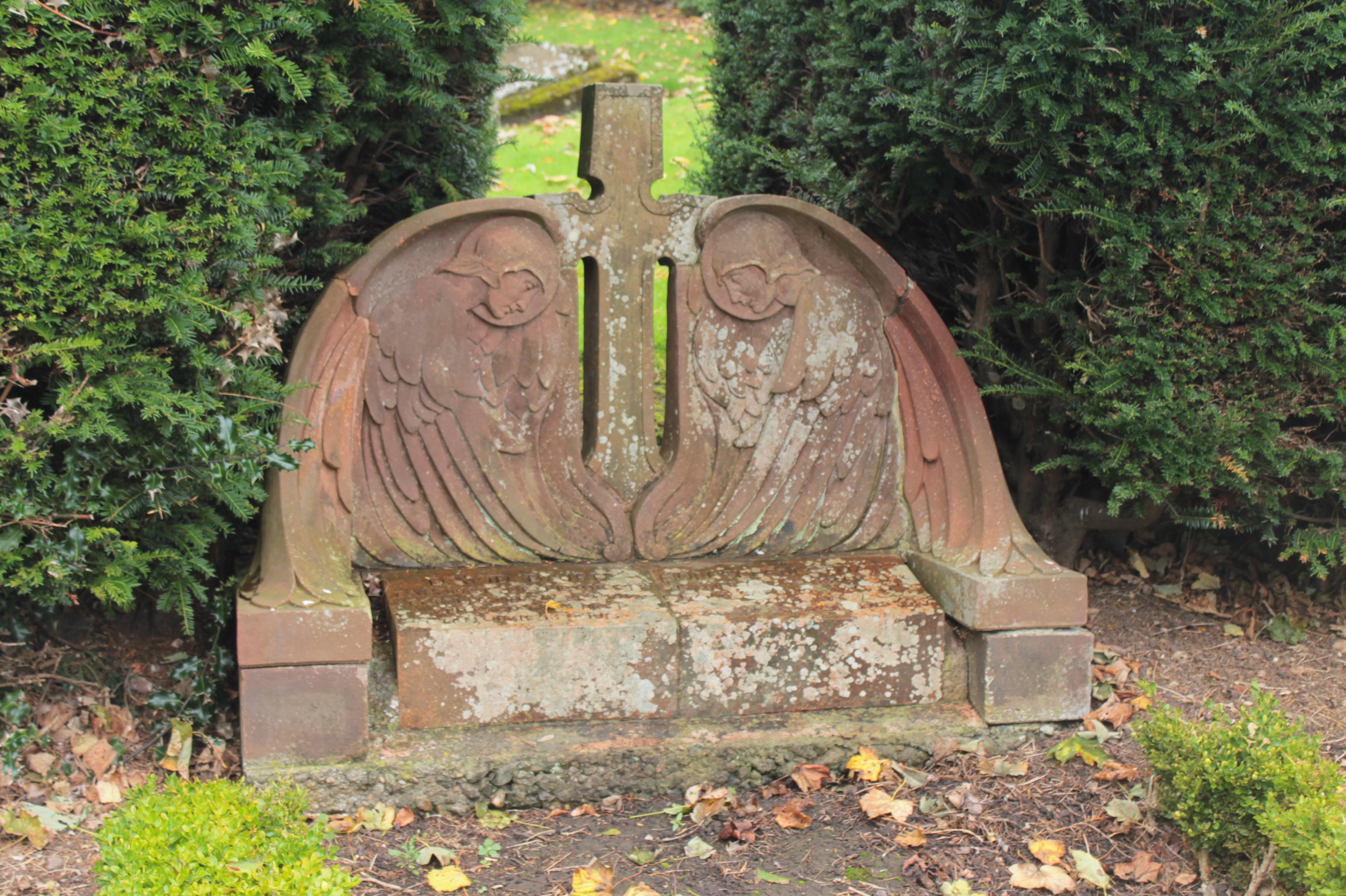
Grave in Whitekirk graveyard

Sir David married in 1864 Honourable Ellen Stuart (31 August 1846 –19 April 1927), daughter and heiress of Charles Stuart, 12th Lord Blantyre. They had six children, including:

- Sir David Baird, 4th Baronet, MVO (6 May 1865 – 1941); an officer in the Black Watch who succeeded as 4th baronet in 1913; married in 1901 Lilian Gertrude Davidson, daughter of Myles James Davidson and widow of Major Ernest Maxwell Willshire, Black Watch.
- William Arthur Baird (b. 1879)
- Evelyn (Eva) Baird; she married in a large society wedding in St George's church, Hanover Square on 19 February 1903 Honourable Ronald Thomas Graham Murray (1875–1934), a major in the Black Watch who fought in the First World War, son of Andrew Murray, 1st Viscount Dunedin. They were childless.
- Hilda Baird
- Mabel Baird

Around the turn of the century they inherited Lennoxlove House near Haddington and settled Newbyth House upon his son and heir David Baird (1865–1941).

== See also ==
- Baird baronets

== Sources ==
- "Death of Sir David Baird". The Glasgow Herald. Friday, 9 January 1852. p. 5.
- "Death of Sir David Baird: Famous Scottish Baronet and Soldier". The Manchester Courier. Tuesday, 14 October 1913. p. 8.
- "Sir David Baird". The Daily Telegraph. Tuesday, 14 October 1913. p. 8.
- "Sir David Baird, 3rd Bt". National Portrait Gallery. Accessed 24 February 2022.
- "The Marriage of Sir David Baird and the Hon. Ellen Stuart". The Morning Post. Thursday, 16 June 1864. p. 5.

Baronetage of the United Kingdom
Preceded by David Baird	Baronet (of Newbyth); 1852–1913	Succeeded by David Baird
