= Marguerite Gaut =

American amateur golfer (1888–1967)

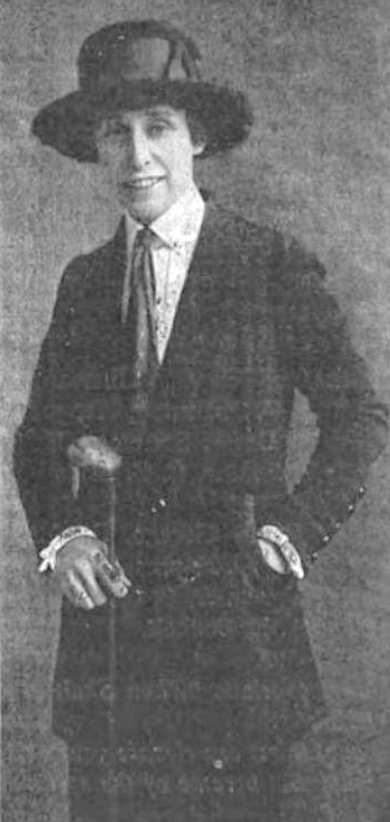
- Marguerite Gaut, from a 1919 publication
- Born: Bessie Marguerite Thrasher; November 12, 1888; Alabama, United States
- Died: December 11, 1967 (aged 79)
- Other names: Mrs. Dave Gaut
- Occupation: Golfer
- Known for: First woman inducted into the Tennessee Sports Hall of Fame

Bessie Marguerite Thrasher Gaut (November 12, 1888 – December 11, 1967) was an American amateur golfer. In 1968, she became the first woman inducted into the Tennessee Sports Hall of Fame.

== Early life and education ==
Marguerite Thrasher was born in Alabama and raised in Virginia and Tennessee, the daughter of Henry Hammond Thrasher and Lula Clark Price Thrasher. She attended Belcourt Seminary, a girls' finishing school in Washington, D.C.

== Career ==
Gaut was a champion amateur golfer based in Memphis. She won the Tennessee Women's Amateur Championship six times, starting at the inaugural event in 1916 and ending in 1938. She won the Southern Women's Championship four times, beginning in 1920, when she defeated Alexa Stirling in Atlanta. She won the Memphis City women's title eleven times. She once played golf against Babe Didrikson Zaharias; they were tied after eighteen holes, but Gaut won on the nineteenth-hole tiebreaker.

Gaut was president of the Women's Southern Golf Association from 1931 to 1939. She sponsored an annual golf tournament at the Memphis Country Club. She attended the Women's Texas Open Golf Tournament in 1945, in Fort Worth. She was president of the United States Senior Women's Golf Association from 1949 to 1952. In 1953, Clifford Davis read remarks into the Congressional Record, marking Gaut's long career in golf. He quoted her as saying, "I hope to play as long as I'm able to walk and every time I play I'll enjoy it."

Gaut also held a patent, granted in 1925, for a clamp to attach a tray to a card table.

== Personal life and legacy ==
Thrasher married insurance agent and golfer David Cleage Gaut in 1910. The couple fostered a daughter, Blanche, from childhood. Marguerite Gaut died in 1967, at the age of 79; her husband died nine days later. The following year, she became the first woman inducted into the Tennessee Sports Hall of Fame. She was also inducted into the Tennessee Golf Hall of Fame, in 2003. From 1953 to 2015, the Women's Southern Golf Association awarded an annual Marguerite Gaut Senior Trophy, named in her honor.
