= Dick Horton =

American golf administrator (born 1949)

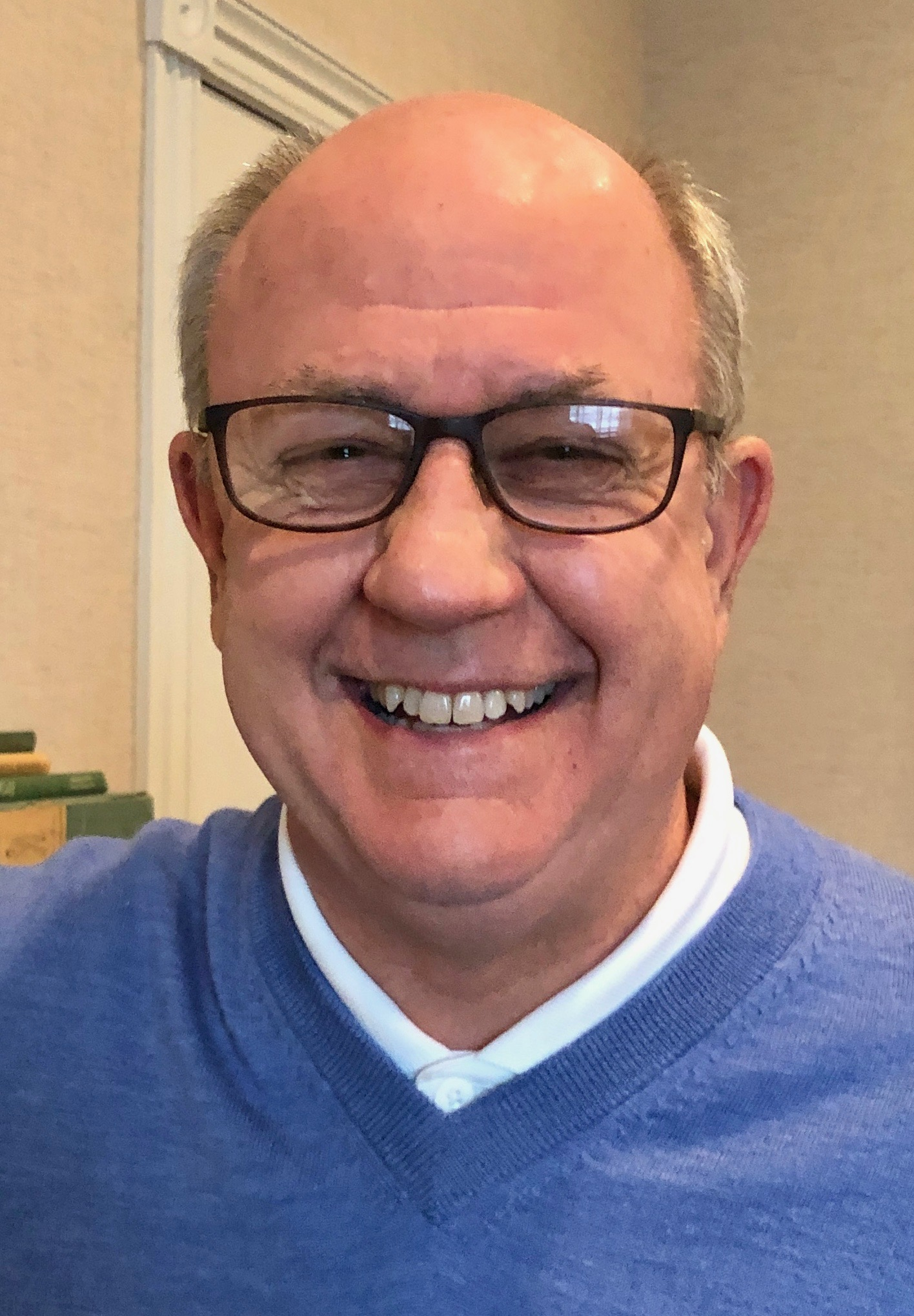
- Dick Horton at Golf House Tennessee, 2018
- Born: 1949 (age 76–77); Hamilton, New York
- Education: Wake Forest University
- Occupation: Golf administrator
- Spouse: Connie Prince
- Children: 1 daughter

Richard J. Horton (born 1949) is an American golf administrator who was inducted into the 2019 Tennessee Golf Hall of Fame. Horton served for 35 years as the executive director of both the Tennessee Golf Association (TGA) and the Tennessee Section PGA (Professional Golf Association of America) . He was one of the first fifteen full-time PGA Section executive directors in the U.S. and he gained national attention by bringing together golf's formerly competitive and often-contentious factions: professional golfers (PGA) and amateur golfers (TGA). He became executive director of both organizations and eventually was able to put all of the state's collective golf operations under one roof.

Starting as a one-man operation in a bedroom office, he took the sport of golf in Tennessee from a largely structureless environment into the era of modern commercial golf. A skilled fundraiser, he secured donations that opened the door to advancement of golf administration— he created a single golf complex called "Golf House Tennessee" which served to administer all golf activities in the state, including pro golf, amateur golf, women's golf, junior golf, and turfgrass research. It was the only facility of its kind at the time. Horton's success influenced other states to follow his blueprint. Tennessean sportswriter Joe Rexrode calls Horton "the Godfather of Tennessee Golf".

== Early life ==
Horton was born in 1949 in Hamilton, New York, a small town that is the home of Colgate University, about 40 miles southeast of Syracuse. His father was a photographer who made composite photographs for college fraternities. His mother worked for Colgate, and this gave him access to the university's golf facilities. At age eight, Horton began playing at a nine-hole course owned by the university and later worked many summers at another university course called "Seven Oaks Golf Club", designed by Robert Trent Jones. Horton mowed and watered the course and sold golf balls he fished out of the lake. He played on his high school golf team and competed in several New York State junior championships. He attended Wake Forest University with hopes of playing college golf there, but failed to qualify as a walk-on. Horton graduated from Wake Forest cum laude in 1971 with a major in Latin. After obtaining a teaching certificate, he taught seventh and eighth graders and coached baseball in Winston-Salem, North Carolina. He knew this was not what he wanted as a career. He got a golf-related job in junior golf for a while, but the Atlanta-based company went out of business; however, it was through that position that he heard about a golf administration job opening in Nashville.

== Career choice ==
In 1973, at age 24 and with a Beatles haircut, Horton applied for a job in Tennessee as a golf administrator— an interview was scheduled. In preparation for the interview, Horton visited Jack Horner who had a similar job in North Carolina. Horner gave him some tips on what the job entailed along with an outline of what Horner had been hoping to accomplish. Later, at Horton's job interview, he found that the Tennessee PGA officials needed administrative help (Note: Golf pro Willie Gibbons said "There was no organization and no management...[in tournaments], players would walk in off the street, pay their ten dollars, and tee off".) but were not exactly sure about what they wanted him to do, so Horton revealed a plan for the future based on his North Carolina visit. He spoke of adding a $4 fee to every pro-am entry fee, getting into the golf handicap business, and starting golf camps– ideas that no other candidate had. "When he left, we kind of looked at each other and said, 'I think we've got our man'", said Joe Taggert, selection committee member." Other selection committee members were Willie Gibbons, Bill Hunt, Cotton Berrier, Bill Garner, and Hollis Morlow. After landing the job, Horton said, "They said there was [only] enough money to pay me for six months. I had those six months to somehow raise the other half of my salary." That 1973 budget of $3,500 by the Tennessee PGA has grown to $22 million for the state's collective golf organizations in 2018. When hired for these positions in 1973, Horton was one of only 15 full-time PGA executive directors in the United States, but for Tennessee, he was the first paid employee. Taggart and Gibbons gave him some hand-me-down items, a mattress, and some dishes with a local country club logo. He rented an apartment and worked as a one-man office in a bedroom with the PGA paying for part of the rent. It took four years before Horton got an actual office. In 1993, Horton and his staff moved to the Legend's Golf Club in Franklin, Tennessee.

In 1973, Horton met his future wife, Connie Prince, who was working at the pro shop at Nashville's Hillwood Country Club. They were married in December, 1974. Their daughter, Margaret, became a skilled player in her youth, and Horton admitted that having a daughter sparked his interest in his creating a girls' junior golf camp.

== Golf Administration ==
It is well-known in the golf world that professional golfers and amateur golfers often have a contentious relationship. Sportswriter Joe Rexrode said, "... from what I can gather, it's like the Jets vs. Sharks while wielding pitching wedges". In the mid-1970s computers were just becoming widely used and Horton found that the PGA (professionals) and the TGA (amateurs) were in head-to head competition for the computerized golf handicap business, each negotiating with competing vendors. Horton helped convince the two factions to join forces, pick one vendor and divide the proceeds.

The TGA golfers saw the early administrative success the PGA was having and inquired whether they might share Horton's services. With some concern over a previously strained relationship, the PGA agreed to "lease" his services to them. The final arrangement was to have the PGA technically be Horton's employer, but let the amateur TGA pay part of his salary and that Horton would have the title of "executive director" of both organizations. The existing TGA secretary/treasurer was told to surrender everything to Horton, including all the records and organization's bank account. Retired USGA official Larry Adamson (Note: Larry Adamson is the retired administrator of USGA championships over a span 23 years (1979–2002), which involves accepting or rejecting all entries to all USGA Championships. He was a former director of the U.S. Open.) said, "Some people just have people skills and Dick was honest, he was straight, he was able to look at both groups and tell them the benefits of being together." As of 2002, Tennessee was one of only four U.S. states to have joint administration of pros and amateurs. This model has been copied by several other states and several have hired Horton's people to run them. Horton also persuaded the men's and women's amateur groups to unite. In 2000, the TGA(men) and WTGA (Women's Tennessee Golf Association) merged, making one governing body for amateur golf in the state. The trend continued in other states.

== Youth golf ==
Horton was one of the first in the nation to organize youth summer golf camps which introduced many youngsters to the sport. The rise of skilled young players helped assure the sport's future popularity, identifying future golf champions and golf teachers. Junior golf in Tennessee came into being in 1974 when Dave Noble, the golf pro at Fall Creek Falls State Park in central Tennessee offered Horton the site to become the "PGA Junior Golf Academy", one of the nation's first. It had 98 boys the first year and Horton rented the cabins for them at the park. After 21 years there the golf academy was moved to new facilities. As of 2018, the junior golf program under director Lissa Bradford has had more than 15,000 graduates .

Horton initiated other golf programs including a junior tour sponsored by PGA tour member Brandt Snedeker; a Ben Hogan Tour event; and the Nashville Golf Open Web.com Tour event. Snedeker himself was a youngster in Junior Golf and knew Horton then. Snedeker said, "We have a bunch of kids who are going to be on the (PGA and LPGA) tour because of the pipeline Dick started."

== Golf House Tennessee ==
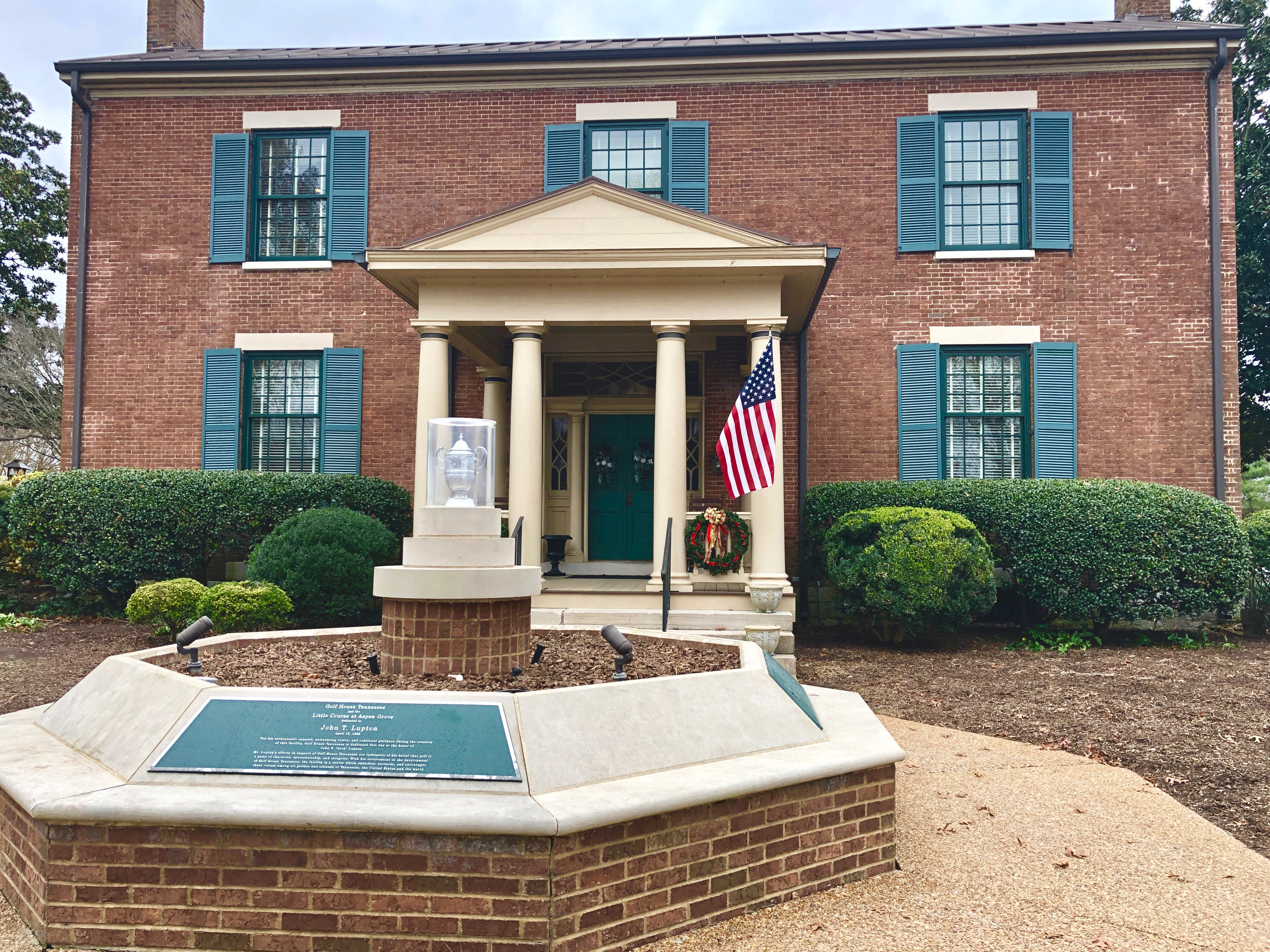
Tennessee Golf Hall of Fame at Golf House Tennessee, Franklin, 2018

In 1992, Horton visited Chattanooga philanthropist and Coca-Cola heir Jack Lupton with four bold requests:

- land and a building to be a home for all golf operations in the state (Golf House Tennessee)
- a new place for the Junior Golf Camp with a dormitory
- a dedicated golf course, for the camp and for turfgrass research
- a state golf hall of fame

Lupton agreed and pledged $5 million, provided that the foundation would raise money from other sources that would start an endowment fund. Thus the Tennessee Golf Foundation, a non-profit, was incorporated in 1990 with Horton as president.

A 15-acre tract with an ante-bellum home was purchased adjacent to the Vanderbilt Legends Golf Course in Franklin, Tennessee, near Nashville. The Vanderbilt Legends course, designed by Bob Cupp and Tom Kite, served as the Tennessee Golf Foundation's temporary headquarters while the land next door was being developed. The house and adjacent land was known as "Aspen Grove"— built in 1830s by Thomas McEwen who fought alongside Andrew Jackson in the Indian wars. Expanded and restored, it was named "Golf House Tennessee" and became the 21,000 square foot centerpiece of all golf operations in the state and opened in April, 1995. As of 1995, Golf House Tennessee was the only facility of its kind. The original structure now houses the Tennessee Golf Hall of Fame. The added administrative center, named for Horton, also contains the Golf Course Superintendents Association of America, the Volunteer Chapter Club Managers Association of America, and the Women's TGA (WTGA) among others. Golf architect Bob Cupp was told to design a par-three course adjoining the Golf House. The first design did not suit benefactor Jack Lupton, who wanted the course to "require use of every club in the bag". Cupp went back to lengthen one hole to 226 yards (thus requiring a Driver), and to make double greens (one green serving two golf holes) to accommodate Lupton's request. The course was named "the Little Course at Aspen Grove". A 64-bed dormitory was built nearby to house the Junior Golf Camp attendees.

Musician Vince Gill is another key player in the success of this endeavor. Gill, a scratch golfer, began hosting an annual golf tournament in 1993 known as "The Vinny Pro-Celebrity Golf Invitational" whose primary beneficiary is the Tennessee Golf Foundation. This tournament has raised over $8 million for Junior Golf to pay for staffing of the golf academy and for "The First Tee" projects and the Vince Gill Junior Tour. Gill received the PGA Distinguished Service Award in 2003, the PGA's highest honor.

== Other endeavors ==
Lupton invited Horton to serve with him on the board of the "Arnold Palmer Golf Company". Horton saw it as a possible conflict of interest, but received permission from his other golf endeavors and took the position. He served for 5 years and said it was an unforgettable experience to sit on quarterly board meetings with Arnold Palmer and Nancy Lopez. Over the years he has been recruited to work for other states (California, Florida), or be director of the inaugural Ben Hogan Tour (later known as the Nike Tour) all of which he declined. He is a member of The Royal and Ancient Golf Club of St Andrews, Scotland and was president of the International Association of Golf Administrators. Horton retired in 2018, after 45 years of golf administration. In 2019, he was inducted into the Tennessee Golf Hall of Fame.
