= The Golfers =

Painting by Charles Lees

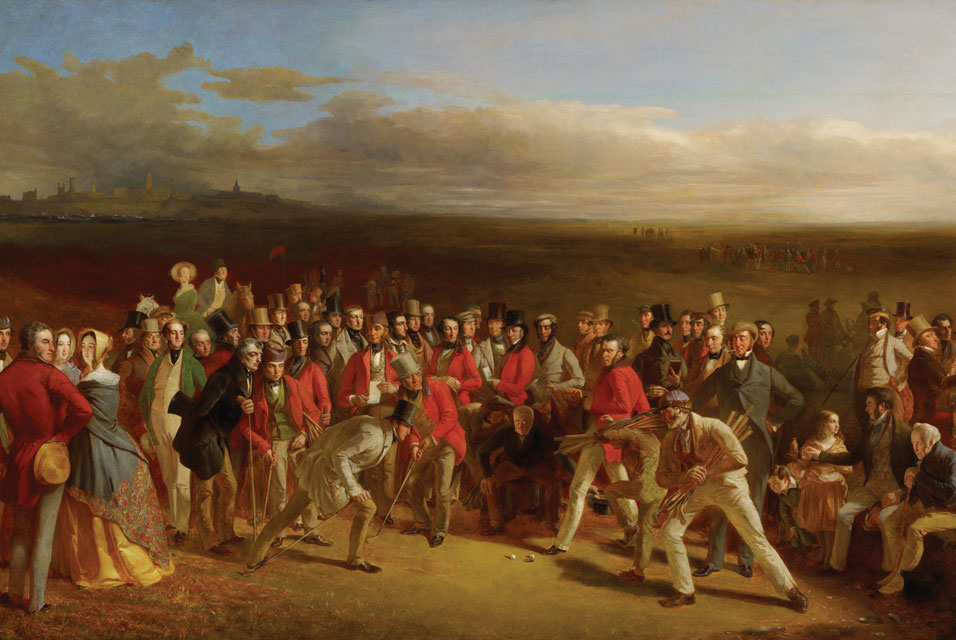
- Artist: Charles Lees
- Year: 1847
- Type: Oil on canvas, portrait painting
- Dimensions: 131 cm × 214 cm (52 in × 84 in)
- Location: Scottish National Portrait Gallery; Edinburgh

The Golfers is an 1847 oil painting by the Scottish artist Charles Lees. It features a group portrait of members of the The Royal and Ancient Golf Club of St Andrews on the Old Course. Described as "One of the most famous of all golf scenes" it features a recreation of an 1844 match involving Sir David Baird, Ralph Anstruther, Hugh Lyon Playfair and John Campbell. Lees spent a great deal of time capturing the likenesses of the various other figures in the painting. It was first displayed at the 1851 exhibition of the Royal Scottish Academy. Today the painting is in the collection of the Scottish National Portrait Gallery in Edinburgh, having been acquired in 2002. It is also known by the longer title The Golfers: A Grand Match Played over the Links of St Andrews.

== Bibliography ==
- Lewis, Peter & Howe, Angela. The Golfers. National Galleries of Scotland, 2004.
- Sandle, Doug & Long, Jonathan. Interrelationships Between Sport and the Arts. Taylor & Francis, 2023.
- Sidorsky, Robert. Golf's Greatest Moments: An Illustrated History By the Game's Finest Writers. Harry N. Abrams, 2003.
