= Baird baronets of Newbyth (first creation, 1680) =

Arms of Newbyth: Gules a boar passant or, on a canton ermine a sword in pale proper

The first Baird baronetcy, of Newbyth in the County of Haddington, was created in the Baronetage of Nova Scotia on 4 February 1680 for William Baird, 1654–1737, son of John Baird, Lord Newbyth. He was registered an advocate and later made Lord of Session.

The title became extinct in 1745 on the death of his son the 2nd Baronet. While the baronetcy failed, the Newbyth estate passed to his cousin William Baird of the Saughtonhall branch of the family. See Baird baronets of Saughtonhall (1695).

== Baird baronets, of Newbyth; first creation (1680) ==
- Sir William Baird, 1st Baronet (1654–1737)
- Sir John Baird, 2nd Baronet (1685–1745). He sat as Member of Parliament for Midlothian.
