= Jean St. Charles =

American amateur golfer

Jean St. Charles (née Cooley) is an American female amateur golfer who was inducted into the Tennessee Golf Hall of Fame in 2018.

She is one of a select group of golf officials who has made a perfect score on the USGA/PGA Rules of Golf examination and she has since personally mentored many golf officials. Her primary contribution to the sport has been in golf officiating and administration more than her skills as a player. She did not play golf until aged 30, but then won the women's club championship four times at her home club, Signal Mountain Golf and Country Club, in Chattanooga, and won the 1967 Chattanooga Women's Senior Amateur title.

After the end of her playing career, she devoted herself to women's golf at the high school, college and amateur level and was the president of at least nine different golf organizations, becoming active as a rules expert and administrator in the sport. She was one of the founders of the Tennessee Women's Open Championship in 1999 and has been its tournament director since its inception. She has been a golf rules chairman or rules official for over 13 different championship events.

== Personal life ==
For 63 years, she was married to Pat St. Charles, a prominent Chattanooga businessman involved in real estate, manufacturing and finance, who died in 2015. She has a daughter and four sons.
