= Culme-Seymour baronets =

Baronetcy in the Baronetage of the United Kingdom

Escutcheon of the Seymour baronets of High Mount and Friery Park

The Seymour, later Culme-Seymour Baronetcy, of High Mount in the County of Cork and Friery Park in the County of Devon, is a title in the Baronetage of the United Kingdom. It was created on 31 May 1809 for the naval commander Admiral Michael Seymour. The second Baronet assumed the additional surname of Culme, which was that of his first wife. The third Baronet was also an admiral in the Royal Navy and notably commanded the Channel Squadron from 1890 to 1892 and the Mediterranean Fleet from 1893 to 1896. The fourth Baronet was a vice admiral in the Royal Navy.

The Culme-Seymour baronets are members of a junior branch of the Seymour family headed by the Duke of Somerset (see Seymour family). The family surname is pronounced "Cullum-Seamer".

== Seymour, later Culme-Seymour baronets, of High Mount and Friery Park (1809) ==
- Rear-Admiral Sir Michael Seymour, KCB, 1st Baronet (1768–1834)
- Reverend Sir John Hobart Culme-Seymour, 2nd Baronet (1800–1880)
- Admiral Sir Michael Culme-Seymour, GCB, GCVO, 3rd Baronet (1836–1920)
- Vice-Admiral Sir Michael Culme-Seymour, MVO, 4th Baronet (1867–1925)
- Sir Michael Culme-Seymour, 5th Baronet (1909–1999)
- Sir Michael Patrick Culme-Seymour, 6th Baronet (born 1962)

The heir apparent to the baronetcy is Michael Culme-Seymour (born 1986), eldest son of the 6th Baronet.

== Extended family ==
Two other members of the family also had distinguished naval careers. Sir Michael Seymour, third son of the 1st Baronet, was an admiral in the Royal Navy. Sir Edward Hobart Seymour, son of Reverend Richard Seymour, fourth son of the 1st Baronet, was an admiral of the fleet.

== Notes ==
Baronetage of the United Kingdom
Preceded by Baird baronets	Seymour baronets of High Mount and Friery Park; 31 May 1809	Succeeded by Irving baronets
