= Baird baronets =

Set index for Baird baronets

There have been four baronetcies created for persons with the surname Baird, two in the Baronetage of Nova Scotia and two in the Baronetage of the United Kingdom.

- Baird baronets of Newbyth (first creation, 1680)
- Baird baronets of Saughtonhall (1695)
- Baird baronets of Newbyth (second creation, 1809)
- Baird baronets of Urie (1897)
