= The Royal and Ancient Golf Club of St Andrews =

Golf club in Scotland

Coordinates: 56.343565°N 2.802801°W

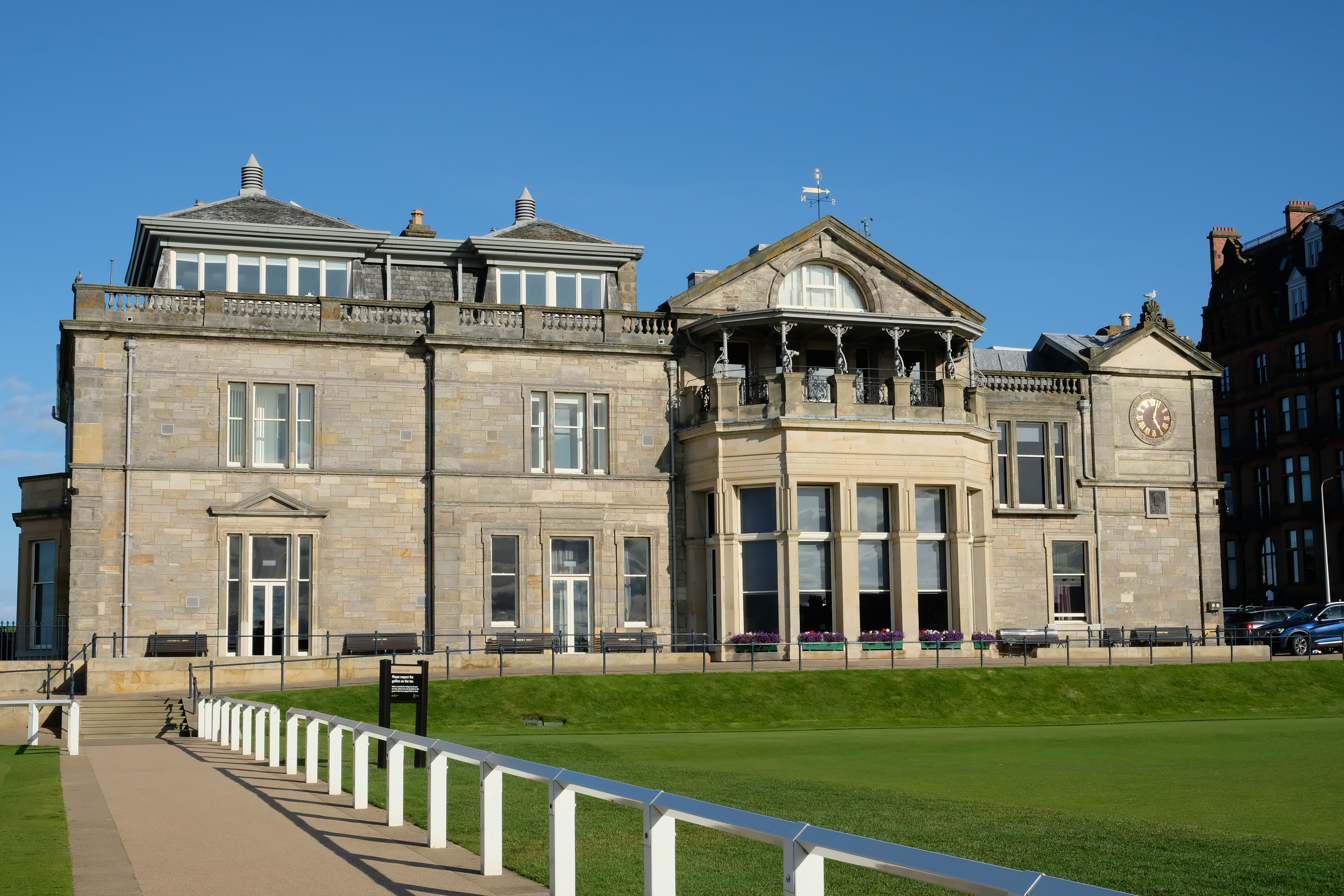
- The Royal and Ancient Golf Club clubhouse in 2019.

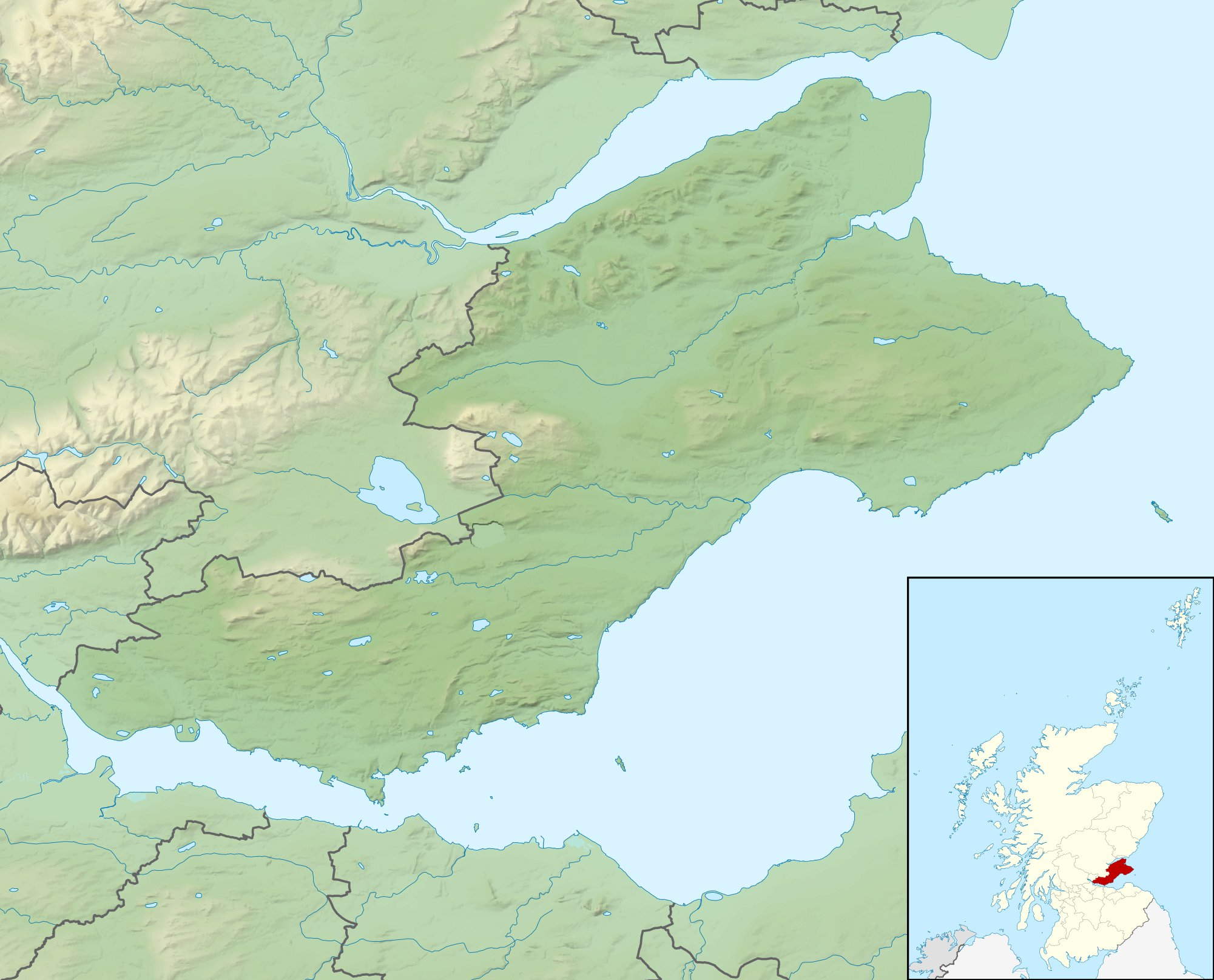
- Location within Fife
- Abbreviation: St Andrews, the R&A
- Formation: 1754, 272 years ago
- Headquarters: St Andrews, Fife, Scotland
- Members: 2,400
- Secretary: Mark Darbon
- Affiliations: The R&A
- Website: randagc.org

Listed Building – Category A
- Official name: Royal and Ancient Golf Club House, The Scores, Golf Place
- Designated: 8 June 1978; 48 years ago
- Reference no.: LB40820

The Royal and Ancient Golf Club of St Andrews is one of the oldest golf clubs in the world. It is a private members-only club based in St Andrews in Scotland. It was previously known colloquially as "The R&A", but in 2004, a new organisation known as The R&A was spun off, assuming the club's functions as one of the governing authorities of the game and organiser of tournaments such as The Open Championship. Despite this legal separation, one of the club's objectives remains to contribute, through its members, to the governance, championship organisation, and golf development roles now carried out by The R&A.

The club does not own any of the St Andrews Links courses, including the Old Course, which are golf courses owned by the local authority through the St Andrews Links Trust, and open to the general public.

== History ==
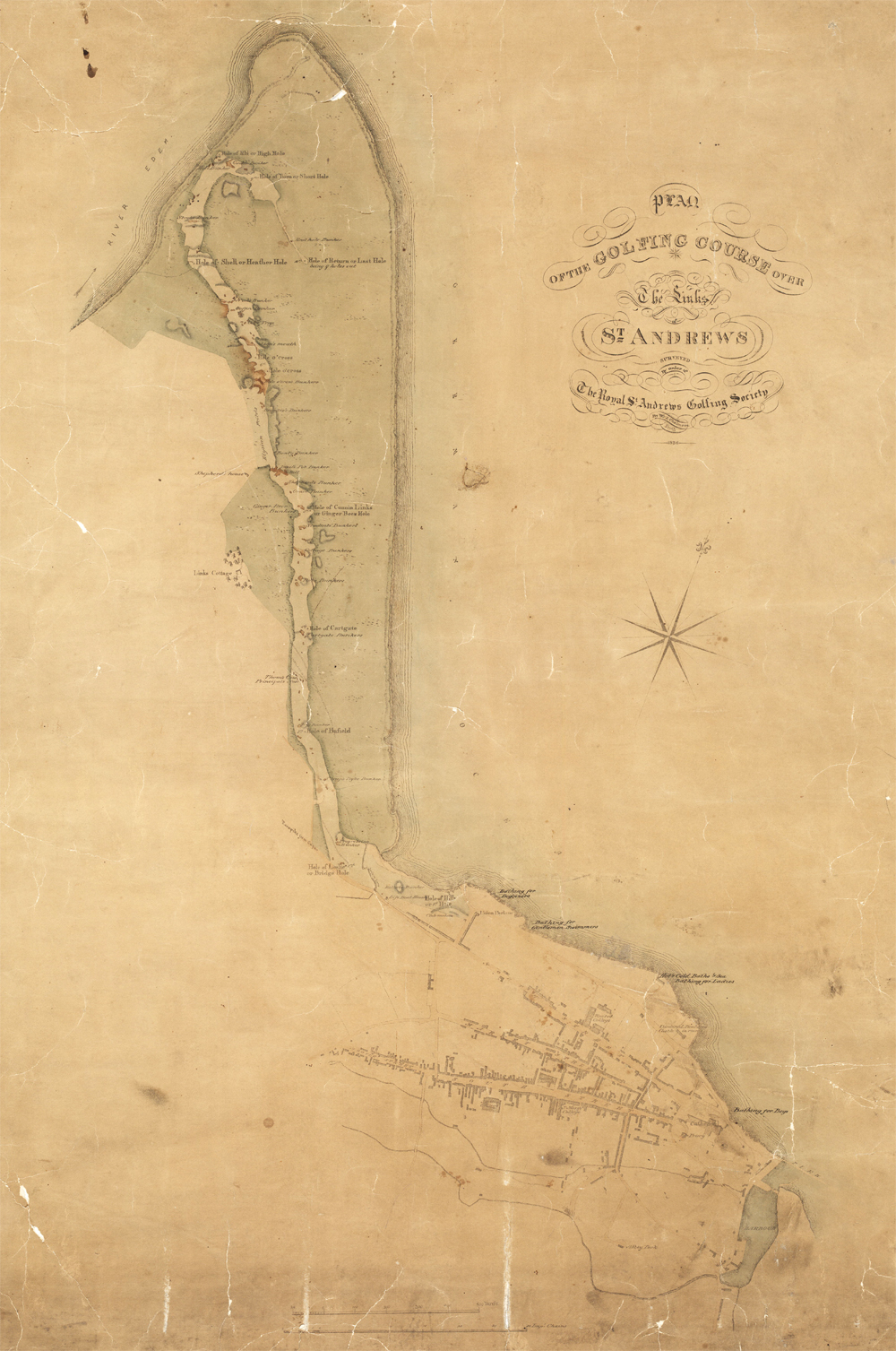
The old course over the links of St Andrews surveyed by order of the Royal St Andrews Golfing Society

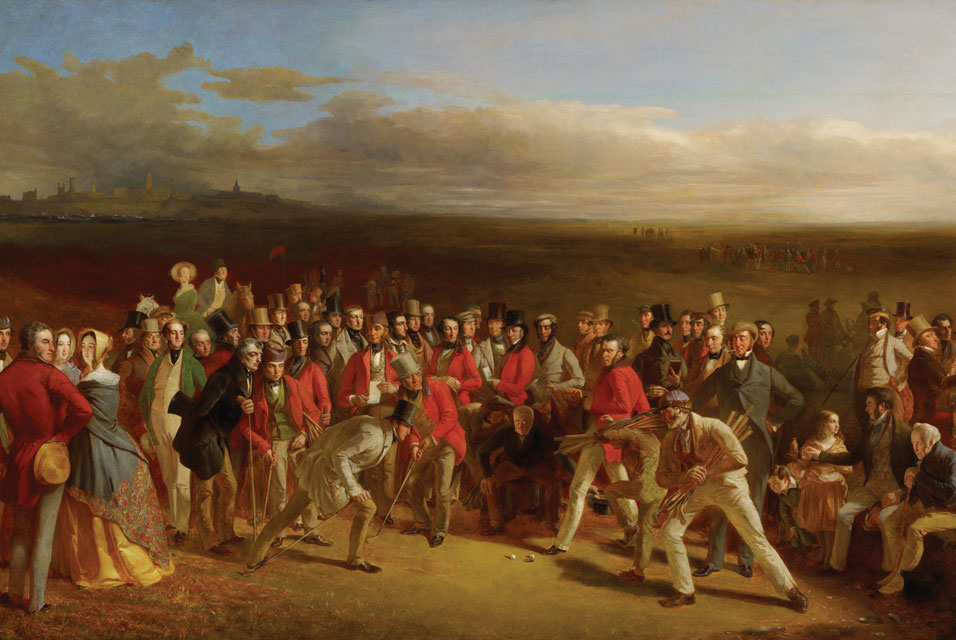
The Golfers by Charles Lees, 1847

The organisation was founded in 1754 as the Society of St Andrews Golfers, a local golf club playing at St Andrews Links. The club quickly grew in importance. In 1834, King William IV recognised St Andrews as Royal and Ancient and The Royal Society of St Andrews Golfers grandly proclaimed it the Home of Golf.

Later it was referred to as The Royal and Ancient Golf Club of St Andrews. In 1897, the Society codified the rules of golf. Over the next 30 years, it was gradually invited to take control of the running of golf tournaments at other courses.

Claire Dowling was appointed to serve as the club's first female captain, for 2026–27.

== Golf club ==
The Royal and Ancient Golf Club of St Andrews itself is now simply a golf club, although membership is by invitation only. It has 2,400 members from all over the world. Although the clubhouse is situated just behind the first tee of the Old Course, the club does not own any of the St Andrews courses.

St Andrews Links are public golf courses, and must share the tee times with members of other local clubs, residents and visitors alike. Responsibility for managing the courses is undertaken by the St Andrews Links Trust, a charitable organisation that owns and runs eight golf courses at St Andrews.

== Membership policy ==
The Royal and Ancient Golf Club (but not The R&A) once had a male-only membership policy. In 2012, former British Prime Minister Gordon Brown called on the club to abandon this in favour of a non-discriminatory policy, as did Louise Richardson, the Principal and Vice-Chancellor of the University of St Andrews.

On 18 September 2014, the club voted in favour of admitting female members. In February 2015 the club's first female honorary members were announced – Anne, Princess Royal; Laura Davies; Renee Powell; Belle Robertson; Lally Segard; Annika Sörenstam; and Louise Suggs. At that time the club also announced, "In addition to the honorary members, a number of women have been admitted as members of the club with more set to follow in the coming months." Also in 2015, Lady Bonallack became the first woman to take part in a match as a member of the club; specifically, she was the first woman to play in the club's annual match against the Links Trust.

== Championships ==
Until 2004, when the R&A took over responsibility from the Royal and Ancient Golf Club, the club had organised 21 championships and international matches including:

- The Open Championship: one of the four major championships in men's golf.
- The Amateur Championship: which was one of the four major championships before the professional game became dominant and is still one of the most prestigious amateur tournaments in the world.
- Boys Amateur Championship: for boys under the age of 18 at midnight on 1 January of the relevant year.
- Boys Home Internationals: a team competition for boys from England, Scotland, Wales and Ireland, with the Irish team selected on an All-Ireland basis.
- Coronation Foursomes: a team competition for women's club golfers in Great Britain & Ireland, open to any (female) member of an affiliated golf club with an official handicap of 36 or under.
- Seniors Open Amateur Championship: for male amateurs aged 55 or over on the first day of competition.
- Senior Open Championship: for men aged 50 and above. A major championship on PGA Tour Champions and the European Senior Tour.
- Walker Cup: a biennial men's amateur team competition contested by Great Britain & Ireland and the United States (co-organised with the United States Golf Association).
- Curtis Cup: a biennial women's amateur team competition contested by Great Britain & Ireland and the United States (also co-organised with the United States Golf Association).
- Junior Open Championship: for boys and girls under the age of 16 at 00.00 hours on 1 January of the relevant year.
- St Andrews Trophy: a biennial men's amateur team competition contested by Great Britain & Ireland and the Continent of Europe.
- Vagliano Trophy: a biennial women's amateur team competition contested by Great Britain & Ireland and the Continent of Europe.
- Jacques Léglise Trophy: an annual boys' amateur team competition contested by Great Britain & Ireland and the Continent of Europe. In years when the St Andrews Trophy is held, the Léglise Trophy is held in conjunction with it at the same venue.

== See also ==
- List of golf clubs granted Royal status
- Golf in Scotland
- St Andrews Links
- R&A World Golf Museum
