= Katherine Graham (golfer) =

American golfer (1923–2019)

Katherine Rowena Graham (née Dinkins; April 17, 1923 – August 24, 2019) was an organizational leader in women's amateur golf and a member of the Tennessee Golf Hall of Fame. Her contribution to golf was her administrative and officiating capabilities more than her individual golfing skill. She was chairman of the United States Golf Association (USGA) Women's Committee 1987 and 1988, the highest volunteer position in women's golf. The committee conducts or supervises golf tournaments for women, mostly amateur events (except for the U.S. Open) and selects the Curtis Cup members.

In this role, Graham was responsible for running the USGA's top three women's events: the Open, the Amateur, and the Mid-Amateur. An expert on the rules of golf, Graham accompanied the final group on the day of the final round in each of these tournaments. She has selected and handicapped golf courses for women's competitions and has officiated at international golf competitions in Europe, South America and China.

She was appointed by the USGA as (non-playing) captain of the 1990 United States World Amateur golf team which won the international competition that year in New Zealand. From 1973 to 1975 she was president of the Women's Southern Golf Association (WSGA). The organization later established a perpetual trophy in her honor named the "Katherine Graham Senior Championship Trophy". Tennessean sportswriter Jimmy Davy called Graham "one of the most influential people in women's amateur golf".

== Personal life ==
She grew up in Memphis, Tennessee, and went to Central High School. She married Willis S. "Bill" Graham in the early 1940s – she met him when he was working in Memphis for The Commercial Appeal and the Memphis Press-Scimitar newspapers. Two weeks after their wedding her husband had to go overseas to serve in the military in World War II, stationed in India as an army newspaper correspondent. During the war, the newlywed couple wrote each other hundreds of letters of "love, longing and hope to be reunited". The letters were later published in a book titled "Til We Meet Again – A Soldier's Love Letters from India" After the war, they moved to Nashville when Bill Graham got a job offer from WSM (AM) radio. He later developed a successful advertising firm and was a pioneer in country music television syndication. They took up golf and played together at Belle Meade Country Club and were charter members of Nashville's Hillwood Country Club. The couple did not have children. She competed in the Women's Southern Amateur in Birmingham in 1971 without success. Graham died on August 24, 2019, at the age of 96.

== Career development ==
The spark for her interest in golf organization may have been when the 1961 Women's Western Open was held in Nashville at her home course. Graham worked as a volunteer and got a behind-the-scenes look at how a professional golf tournament is run. Graham played as a member of the Nashville Women's Golf Association and became its president. Subsequently, she became president of several progressively larger women's golf organizations, leading to the Women's Southern Golf Association and high office in the USGA. Tennessean sportswriter Jimmy Davy called Graham "one of the most influential people in women's amateur golf". Graham readily admitted that, despite her avid pursuit of the game, her personal golf skills were not the reason for her prominence in the sport.

== Women's Southern Golf Association ==
This organization was founded in 1911 to promote women's amateur golf in the southern United States. It began with a letter-writing campaign to the country clubs in 15 southern U.S. states by two women, Mrs. Willard Parker Sullivan (Birmingham) and Mrs. George Harrington (Atlanta). Graham was president of the organization from 1973 to 1975. She hosted the 60th WSGA tournament at her home course at Belle Meade Country Club in Nashville with a field of 144 players. In 1986, the organization established a perpetual trophy named the "Katherine Graham Senior Championship Trophy".

== U.S. World Amateur team ==
In 1990, the USGA appointed Graham as (non-playing) captain of the United States team in the World Amateur Team Championship. The competition occurs every two years, sponsored by the International Golf Federation (IGF) and usually includes teams from about 50 nations. The 1990 competition was held at the Russley Golf Club in Christchurch, New Zealand, October 18–21 of that year. The United States team was the defending champion at the time. Graham's golfers were: Vicki Goetze (18-year-old former U.S. Women's Amateur champion), Pat Hurst (reigning U.S. Women's Amateur champion) and Karen Noble. The two best scores of the three-player team counted, winning the Espirito Santo Trophy for the U.S.

== USGA Women's committee ==
Graham was Chairman of the Women's Committee of the USGA in 1987 and 1988. This 21 member committee conducts or supervises golf tournaments for women, mostly amateur events (except for the U.S. Open) and selects the Curtis Cup members. Graham said "We serve as a rules committee, we conduct tournaments, we're referees". In the 1980s Graham was responsible for running the USGA's top three women's events: the Open, the Amateur, and the Mid-Amateur. In each of these championships Graham, a Rules of Golf expert, accompanied the final group of the final round. She has officiated at a number of international golf competitions, including Sweden, France, Venezuela and Hong Kong. She has been active in selecting and handicapping golf courses where USGA women's amateur tournaments are held.

As committee chairman in 1987, Graham spoke out against offering expensive prizes in amateur tournaments, like winning a new car for a hole-in-one, because such a prize (over $500) would void that golfer's amateur status. She thought it too tempting and that it "violated the spirit of the game".

== Other honors and awards ==
Graham was the first recipient of the Mercedes-Benz Amateur Award called the "Legends of Women's Golf Award" in 1997. She has been a member of the USGA's Bob Jones Award Committee and the USGA Museum Committee. At the Tennessee Golf Foundation's "Golf House Tennessee" there is a courtyard named for her. She has three golf tournaments named for her: The Senior Trophy of the Women's Southern Golf Association; the Nashville Women's Golf Association Club Trophy; and the Nashville Inter-club Trophy. In 2003, she was inducted into the Tennessee Golf Hall of Fame.
