= Golf House Tennessee =

Building in Nashville, Tennessee, US

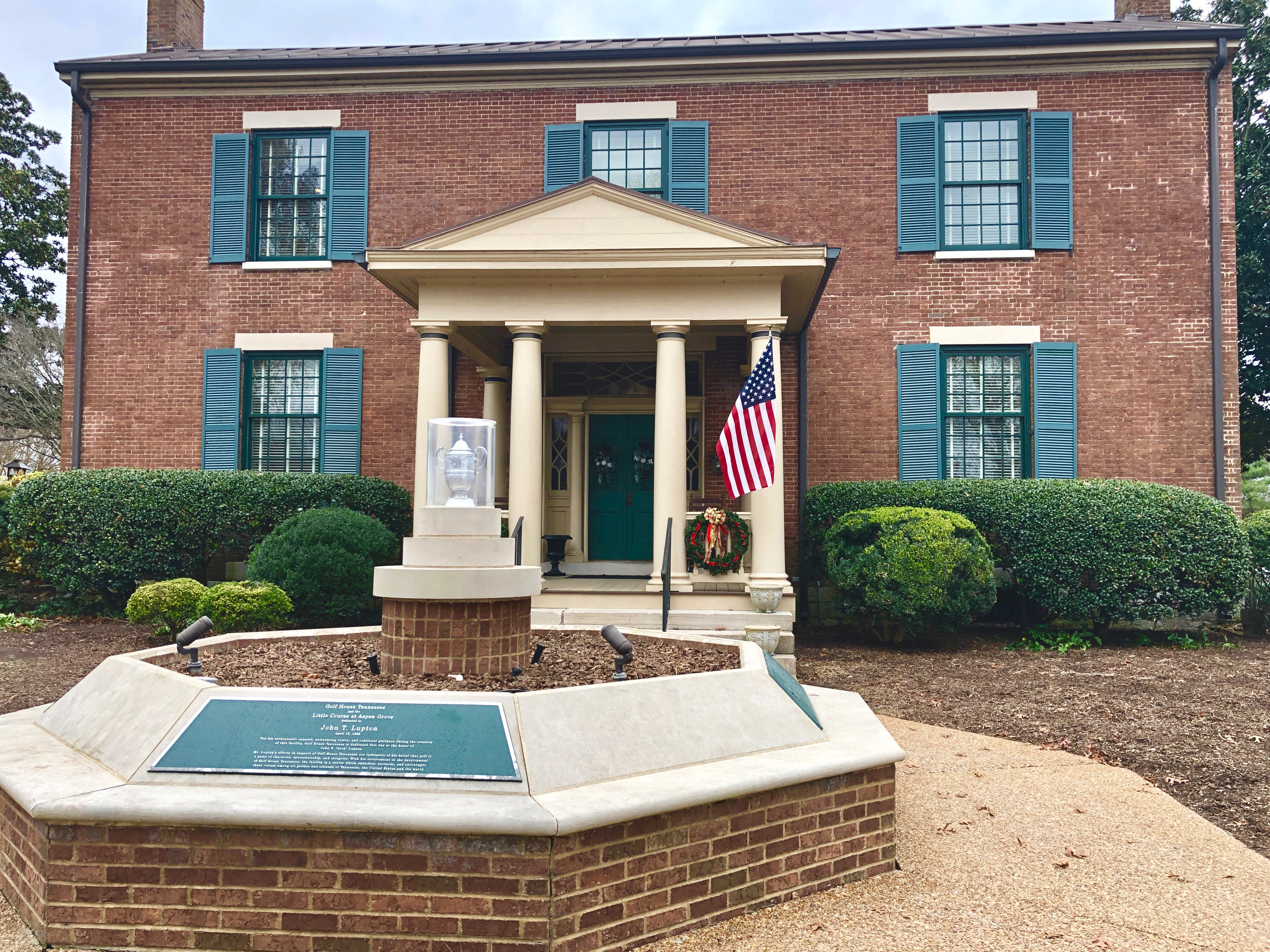
Golf House Tennessee, 2018

Golf House Tennessee is the name given to an ante-bellum house in the suburbs of Nashville, Tennessee that serves as home of the non-profit "Tennessee Golf Foundation". It houses the offices all of the state's golf associations. The historic house is the focal point of a 15-acre (6.1 ha) sprawling complex that administers amateur golf, professional golf, women's golf, junior golf, turfgrass research, and the Tennessee Golf Hall of Fame, among others.

In the late 1980s, Tennessee's amateur golf organization and its professional golf organization were competitors, and their relations were often antagonistic. One major point of contention was control over the emerging market for computerized golf handicapping services and the profits it might yield. After years of disputes and strained relations, a unifying figure emerged in Dick Horton, a young executive with experience in both camps. Horton had previously worked for each organization and had intimate knowledge of both. The merger effort, which began around 1990, required significant fundraising, as neither group had substantial financial resources. Crucial philanthropic support came from philanthropist Jack Lupton and musician Vince Gill. The initiative, centered in Nashville, proved so successful it gained national attention and served as a model for other states. The amateurs consisted of the TGA (Tennessee Golf Association); the professionals consisted of the PGA Tennessee (branch of the Professional Golf Association). The combination became the "Tennessee Golf Foundation", which began operations in the Golf House Tennessee facility in 1995. In 2000, the TGA(men) and WTGA (Women's Tennessee Golf Association) merged, making one governing body at Golf House Tennessee for all amateur golf in the state.

The Golf House Tennessee complex, as of 2023, includes:

- the Tennessee Golf Hall of Fame and exhibits,
- USGA exhibits,
- The Tennessee Junior PGA Golf Academy.
- A full-service dining room
- A nine-hole par three golf course, designed by golf architect Bob Cupp,
- Dormitories for junior golf camp, able to accommodate 48 juniors and 16 adults,
- An Association History Room that houses trophies and memorabilia.
- A turfgrass research facility which includes over 52 varieties of turfgrass including 17 types of bentgrass.
- Offices of the Golf Course Superintendents Association of America, the Volunteer Chapter Club Managers Association of America, and the Women's TGA (WTGA) among others.

== Funding ==
Chattanooga philanthropist and Coca-Cola heir Jack Lupton pledged $5 million to the project, provided that the foundation would raise money from other sources that would create an endowment fund. Thus, the Tennessee Golf Foundation, a non-profit, was incorporated in 1990 with Dick Horton as president.

Country Music Hall of Fame member Vince Gill played a vital role in the success of Golf House Tennessee. Gill, a scratch golfer, became very interested in raising funds for the foundation. He began hosting an annual golf tournament in 1993 known as "The Vinny" (The Vinny Pro-Celebrity Golf Invitational), whose primary beneficiary is the Tennessee Golf Foundation. As of 2018, tournament had raised over $8 million for Junior Golf to pay for staffing of the golf academy under its director, PGA pro Lissa Bradford; also for "The First Tee" projects and the Vince Gill Junior Tour. Gill received the PGA Distinguished Service Award in 2003, the PGA's highest honor.

== See also ==
- Dick Horton § Golf House Tennessee
