= Sir David Baird, 1st Baronet =

British Army officer

General The Right Honourable Sir David Baird GCB Bt
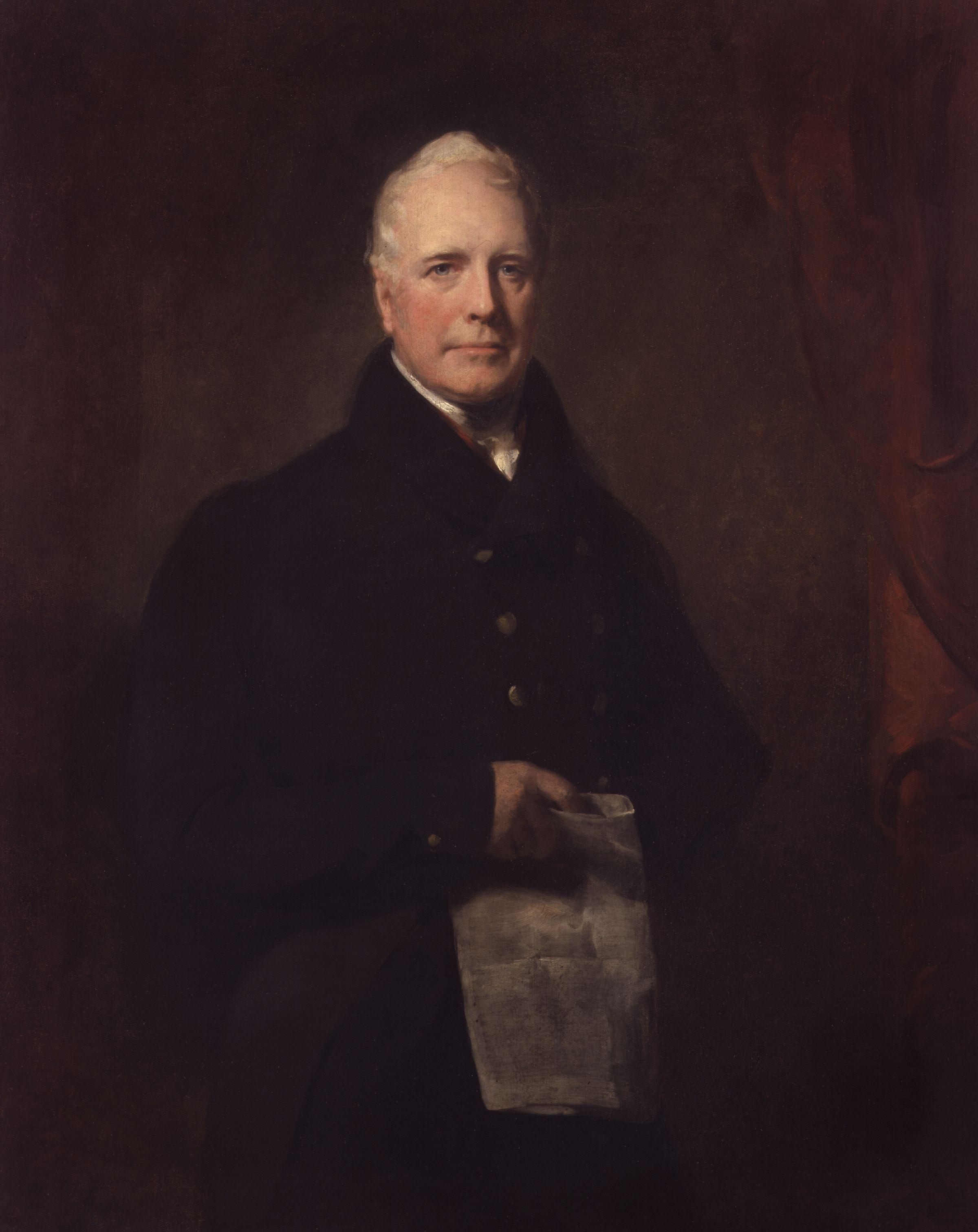
- Portrait by John Watson Gordon, c. 1825
- Born: 6 December 1757; Newbyth House, East Lothian
- Died: 18 August 1829 (aged 71); Crieff, Perthshire
- Military career
- Allegiance: United Kingdom
- Branch: British Army
- Rank: General
- Commands: Ireland
- Conflicts: Second Anglo-Mysore War; Third Anglo-Mysore War; Fourth Anglo-Mysore War; French Revolutionary Wars; Peninsular War
- Awards: Knight Grand Cross of the Order of the Bath

General Sir David Baird, 1st Baronet, of Newbyth, GCB (6 December 1757 – 18 August 1829) was a British Army officer who served in the Anglo-Mysore wars and French Revolutionary and Napoleonic Wars.

== Military career ==
He was born at Newbyth House in Haddingtonshire, Scotland, the son of an Edinburgh merchant family, and entered the British Army in 1772. He was sent to India in 1779 with the 73rd (afterwards 71st) Highlanders, in which he was a captain. Immediately on his arrival, Baird was attached to the force commanded by Sir Hector Munro, which was sent forward to assist the detachment of Colonel Baillie, threatened by Hyder Ali. In the action which followed the whole force was destroyed, and Baird, severely wounded, fell into the hands of the Mysore chief. The prisoners remained captive for over four years. Baird's mother, on hearing that her son and other prisoners were in fetters, is said to have remarked, "God help the chiel chained to our Davie." The bullet was not extracted from Baird's wound until his release.

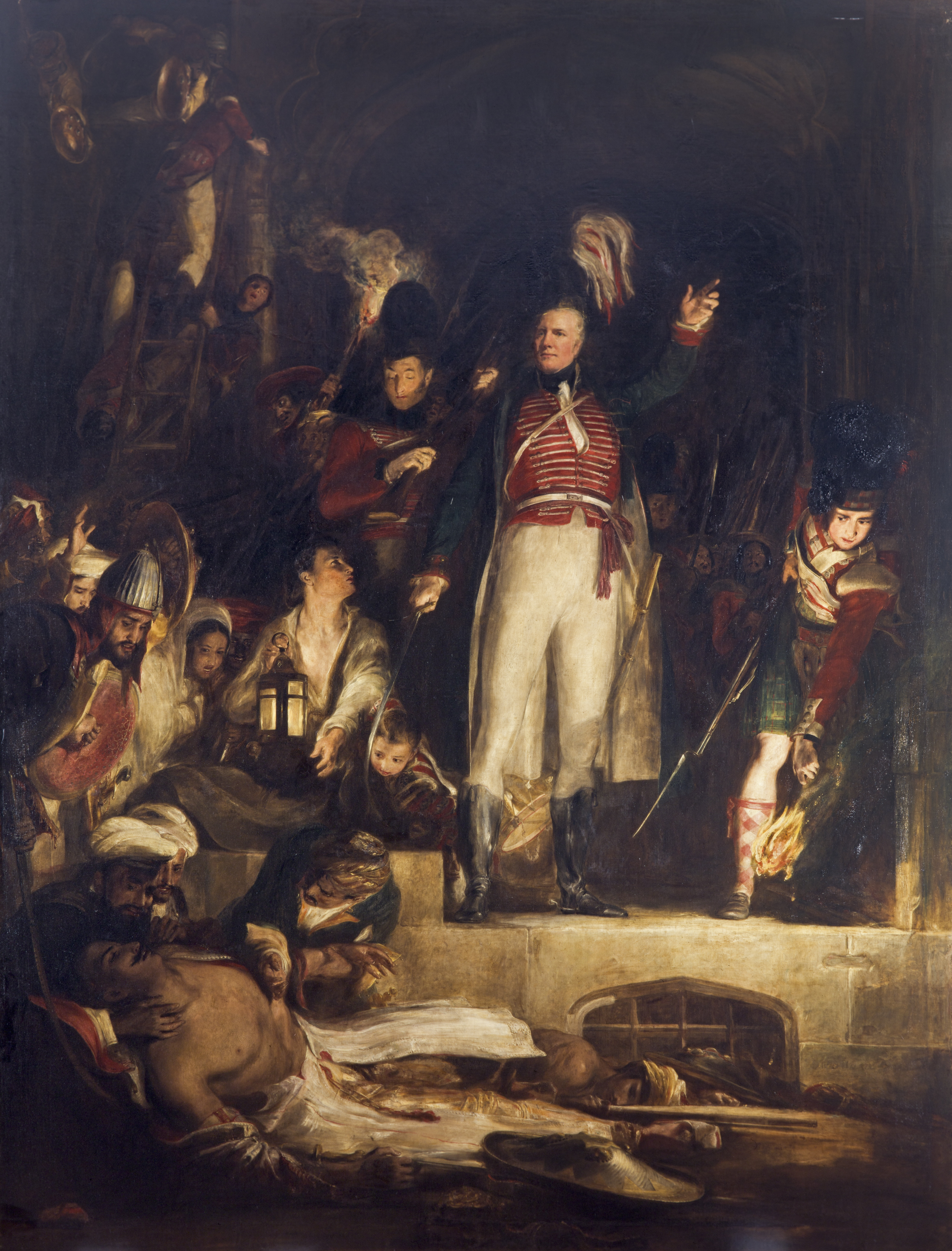
Sir David Baird Discovering the Body of Sultan Tipoo Sahib (David Wilkie, 1839)

He was promoted to major in 1787, visited England in 1789, and purchased a lieutenant-colonelcy in 1790, returning to India the following year. He held a brigade command in the war against Tipu Sultan, and served under Lord Cornwallis in the Seringapatam operations of 1792. He captured Pondicherry, being promoted colonel in 1795. Baird served also at the Cape of Good Hope as a brigadier-general, and he returned to India as a major-general in 1798. In the last war against Tipu in 1799 Baird was appointed to the senior brigade command in the army. At the successful assault of Seringapatam, Baird led the storming party, and soon took the stronghold where he had previously been a prisoner.

Disappointed that the command of the large contingent of the nizam was given to the then Colonel Arthur Wellesley, and that after the capture of the fortress the same officer obtained the governorship, Baird felt he had been treated with injustice and disrespect. He later received the thanks of parliament and of the Honourable East India Company for his gallant bearing on that important day, and a pension was offered him by the company, which he declined, apparently in the hope of receiving the Order of the Bath from the government.

General Baird commanded an Anglo-Indian expeditionary that had been raised in Bombay early 1801 to co-operate with Sir Ralph Abercromby in the expulsion of the French from Egypt. He arrived after the Battle of Alexandria on 21 March 1801, where soon afterward Abercromby was killed in a skirmish, dying on 28 March. Wellesley had been appointed second in command to Baird, but owing to ill-health did not accompany the expedition on 9 April 1801. Baird reached Jeddah on 17 May, where he was joined by a contingent from the Cape of Good Hope. The force went onto and landed at Kosseir on 8 June, and marched 167 miles across the desert to Qena on the Nile, and then another 253 miles to Cairo. The French surrendered Cairo on 27 June. The Indian contingent then marched on to Alexandria in time for the Siege of Alexandria fought between 17 August and 2 September 1801.

On his return to India in 1802, he was employed against Sindhia, but being irritated at another appointment given to Wellesley he relinquished his command and returned to Europe. In 1804 he was knighted, and in 1805–1806, being by now a lieutenant-general, he commanded the expedition against the Cape of Good Hope with complete success, capturing Cape Town and forcing the Dutch general Janssens to surrender. But here again his usual ill luck attended him. Commodore Sir Home Popham persuaded Sir David to lend him troops for an expedition against Buenos Aires; the successive failures of operations against this place involved the recall of Baird early in 1807, though on his return home he was quickly re-employed as a divisional general in the Copenhagen expedition of 1807. During the subsequent Battle of Copenhagen, Baird was wounded. The same year he was made Colonel of the 24th (2nd Warwickshire) Regiment of Foot, a post he would hold until his death.

Shortly after his return, he was sent out to the Peninsular War in command of a considerable force which was sent to Spain to cooperate with Sir John Moore, to whom he was appointed second in command. It was Baird's misfortune that he was junior by a few days both to Moore and to Lord Cavan, under whom he had served at Alexandria, and thus never had an opportunity of a chief command in the field. At the Battle of Corunna, he succeeded to the supreme command after Moore's death, but shortly afterwards his left arm was shattered, and the command passed to Sir John Hope. Once again thanked by parliament for his gallant services, he was made a Knight Grand Cross of the Bath and a baronet in 1809. He was not employed again in the field, and personal and political enmities caused him to be neglected and repeatedly passed over.

He was not given the full rank of general until 1814, and his governorship of Kinsale was given five years later. In 1820 he was appointed commander-in-chief in Ireland and made a Privy Counsellor for Ireland, but the command was soon reduced, and he resigned in 1822.

== Family ==
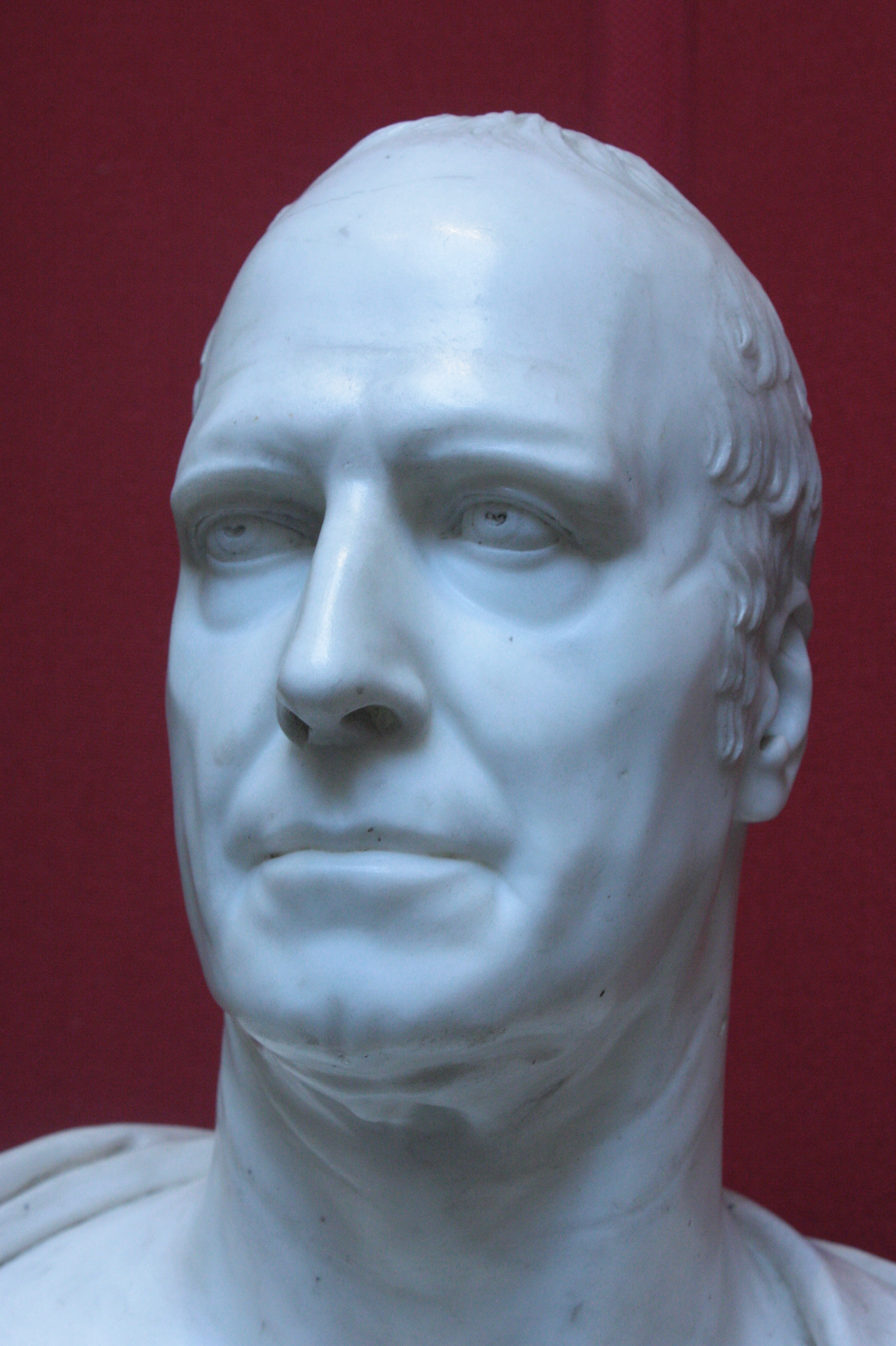
Sculpture of Baird by Lawrence Macdonald, 1828

Arms: Gules a boar passant or, on a canton ermine a sword in pale proper.

Sir David Baird was the fifth son of an Edinburgh merchant, William Baird of Newbyth, who was grandson of Sir Robert Baird, Bart., of Saughton, and cousin and heir of Sir John Baird, Bart., of Newbyth, and Alicia Johnston.

Sir David married Anne Preston Menzies Campbell Preston, daughter and heiress of Major Patrick Preston, Younger of Valleyfield, on 4 August 1810.

He died on 18 August 1829 at age 71, without issue, and was succeeded by his nephew, David, the son of Robert Baird and Hersey Christina Maria Gavin.

His widow erected an obelisk to him on a hillock above Trowan near Crieff. On the south side of the monument is a plaque commemorating the march of the Anglo-Indian army across the Great desert from Kosseir to Alexandria 1801.

== Popular culture ==
Baird appears as a character in the Sharpe series of novels, focusing on his role in the 1799 Mysore campaign, and the 1807 expedition to Copenhagen. Baird is shown as hearty, bluff likeable man, and is friendly towards Sharpe. He is described as being able to move within the high society. Though an officer, he was considered to be fearless, he could outswear any sergeant and was as tough as an enlisted man. Though a high-ranking officer, he led from the front with the men.

Baird also appears as a commanding General in the naval fiction book The Only Victor by Alexander Kent. This is set just before Baird's successful campaign to capture Cape Town of which he eventually became the Governor.

Baird's role in the capture of Cape Town is described in some detail by Julian Stockwin in his novel Conquest, published in 2011, as is Baird's role in the attack on Buenos Aires in Stockwin's book Betrayal, released in 2012.

Baird is one of several 17th and 18th century generals, used as computer opponent identities in many computer adaptations of the board game Risk.

Baird also appears by reference in the opening pages of the novel The Moonstone, by Wilkie Collins.

Military offices
Preceded by Jan Willem Janssens as Governor of the Dutch Cape Colony	Governor of the Cape Colony, acting 1806–1807	Succeeded by Henry George Grey, acting
Preceded by Richard Whyte	Colonel of the 24th (the 2nd Warwickshire) Regiment of Foot; 1807–1829	Succeeded by Sir James Frederick Lyon
Preceded by Mariscoe Frederick	Colonel of the 54th (West Norfolk) Regiment of Foot; 1801–1807	Succeeded by Oliver Nicolls
Preceded by Sir George Beckwith	Commander-in-Chief, Ireland; 1820–1822	Succeeded by Sir Samuel Auchmuty
Preceded by Alexander Ross	Governor of Inverness; 1827–1829	Succeeded by Sir George Murray
Baronetage of the United Kingdom
New creation	Baronet (of Newbyth); 1809–1829	Succeeded by David Baird
