= Charles Lees (painter) =

Scottish painter (1800–1880)

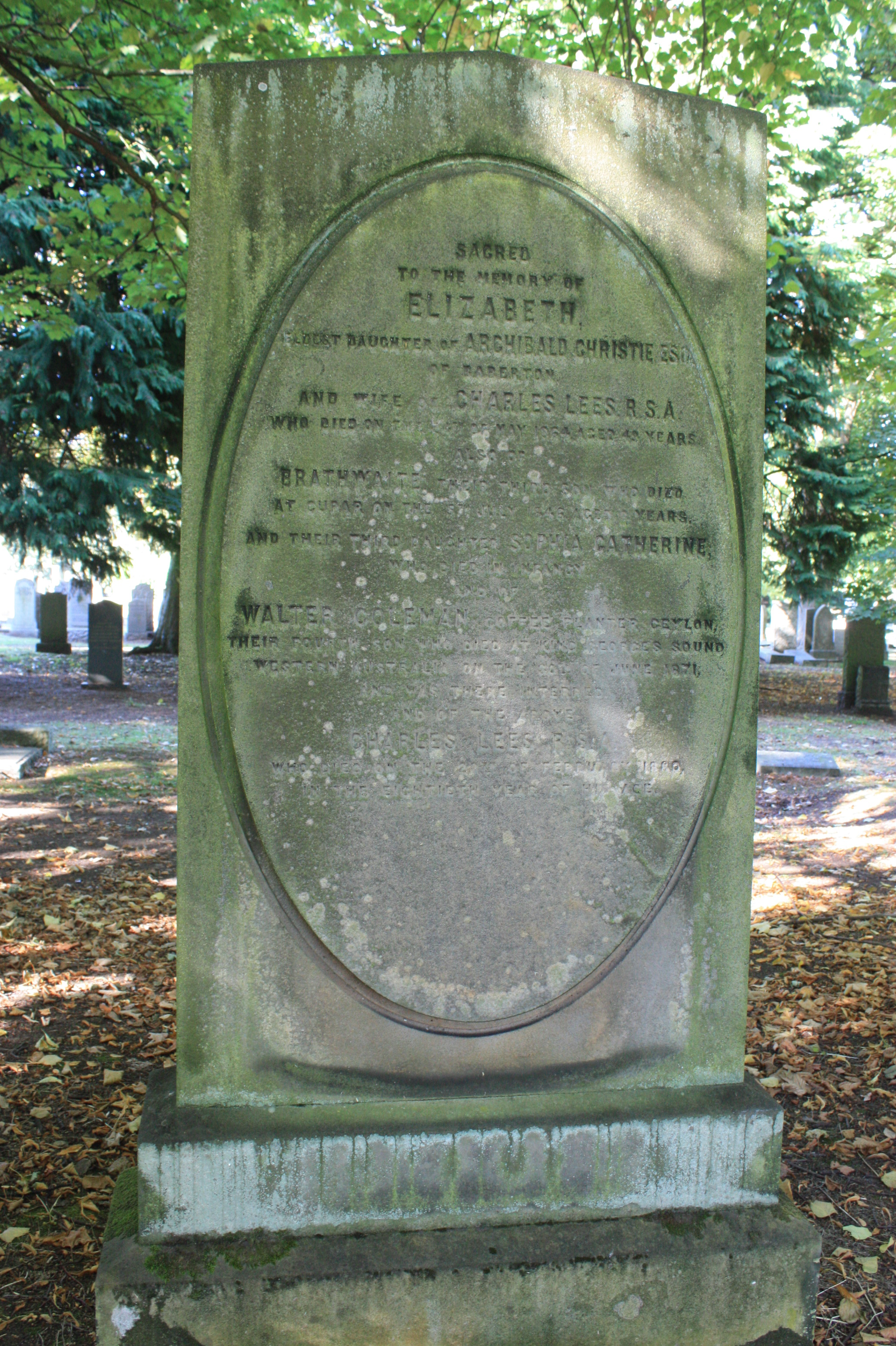
The grave of Charles Lees, Warriston Cemetery, Edinburgh

Charles Lees RSA (1800–20 February 1880) was a Scottish portrait painter who specialised in sporting and recreational subjects.

== Life ==
Lees was born in 1800 in Cupar, Fife, Scotland. He began his career in art training under the eminent Edinburgh portrait painter Sir Henry Raeburn. He went to Rome for six months, and on return spent the majority of his working life in Edinburgh, having his studio at 19 Scotland Street. Lees also taught drawing.

In the 1830s Charles Lees, portrait painter is listed as living at 9 Elder Street in Edinburgh's New Town.

He died in Edinburgh on 20 February 1880 and was buried with his wife Elizabeth Christie of Baberton, and their children, in Warriston Cemetery. The grave stands on the north side of the main east-west path in the upper section.

== Portrait painting to sporting and recreational subjects ==
Charles Lees achieved initial renown as a portrait painter, his accomplishments leading to his election to the Royal Scottish Academy in 1830. He later served as the Academy's Treasurer.

Lees is perhaps best known for his work specialising in sporting and recreational subjects, particularly golfing and curling, to which he turned from the 1840s.

Portrait of David Scott, circa 1848-1849

A Scene on Duddingston Loch, near Edinburgh, 1853

The Summer Moon – Bait Gatherers, 1858

St Monans

== "The Golfers" ==
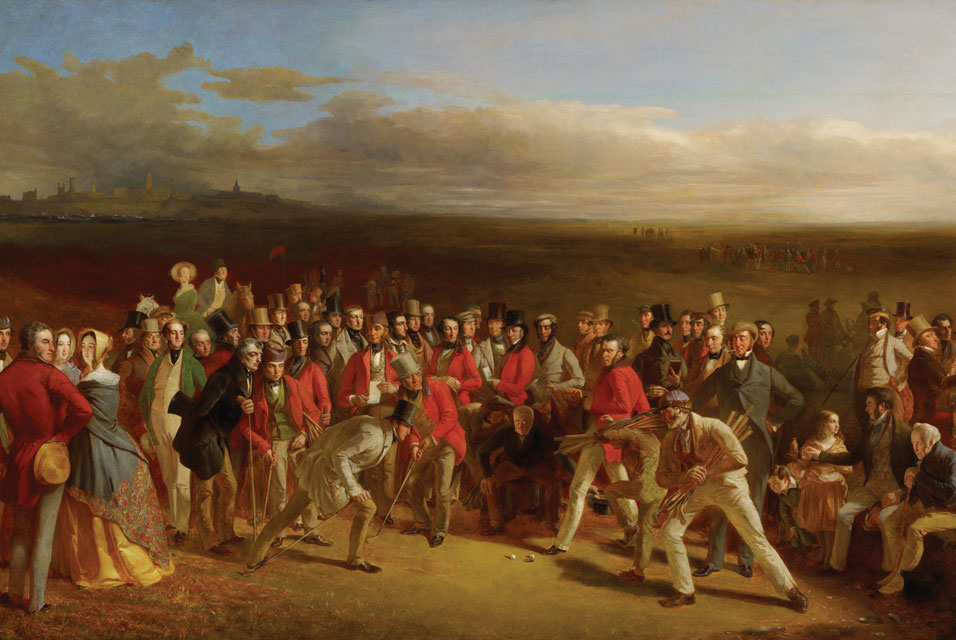
The Golfers, by Charles Lees, 1847

In 1847 Lees completed his depiction of the 1844 grand match at St Andrews in an oil painting, The Golfers, which has been cited as being "the most famous golfing work of art in the world." It shows the annual autumn meeting of October 1844, the scene being set at the 'Ginger Beer Hole' on the Old Course at St Andrews. The match that Lees painted was between Sir David Baird and Sir Ralph Anstruther of Balcaskie against Major Hugh Lyon Playfair of St Andrews and John Campbell, Esq. of Glensaddel. As a portrait painter Lees had painted the true likeness of the actual players and spectators, and a key survives naming them. The original oil painting is owned by the Scottish National Portrait Gallery. An engraving was made by Charles E. Wagstaffe (born 1808) from which prints were produced. In 2006 the National Galleries of Scotland produced a monograph on the painting: 'The Golfers', by P. Lewis and A. Howe.
