= Baird baronets of Saughtonhall (1695) =

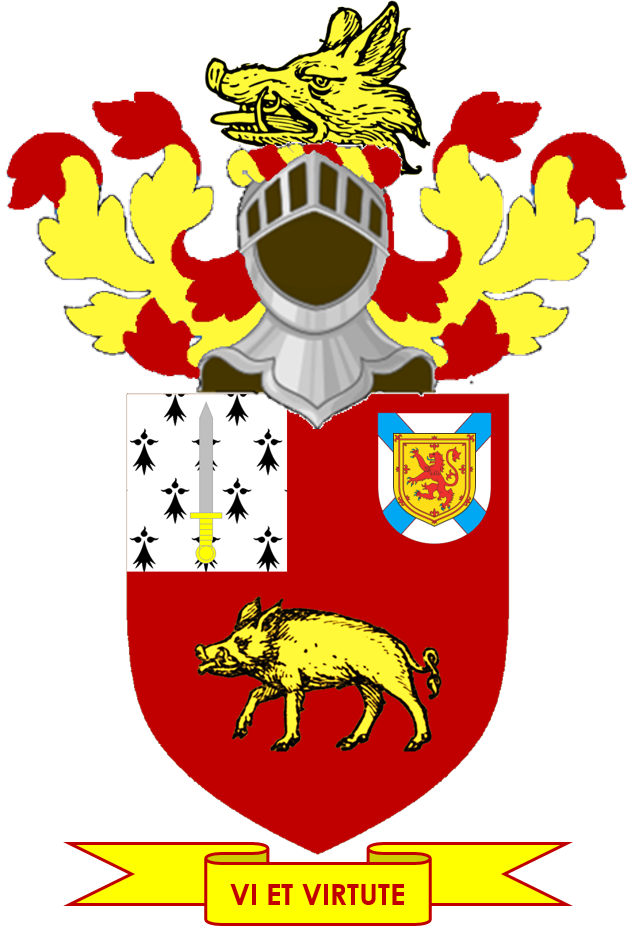
Arms of Saughton Hall: Gules a Sanglier passant Or on a Canton Ermine a Sword paleways proper; Crest: A Boar's Head erased Or: Motto: Vi et virtute (By strength and valour)

The Baird baronetcy of Saughtonhall (also Saughton Hall or Sauchtonhall) in the County of Edinburgh, was created in the Baronetage of Nova Scotia on 28 February 1695 for Robert Baird (1630–1697), a merchant in Edinburgh, and a partner in both the Leith Sugar House and the Carolina Society. The title was created with remainder to the heirs male of his body.

David Baird, 4th Baronet, died from wounds received at the Battle of Fontenoy in 1745. His brother William Baird, 5th Baronet, was a captain in the Royal Navy, and married Frances, daughter of Colonel James Gardiner.

== Baird baronets, of Saughtonhall (1695) ==
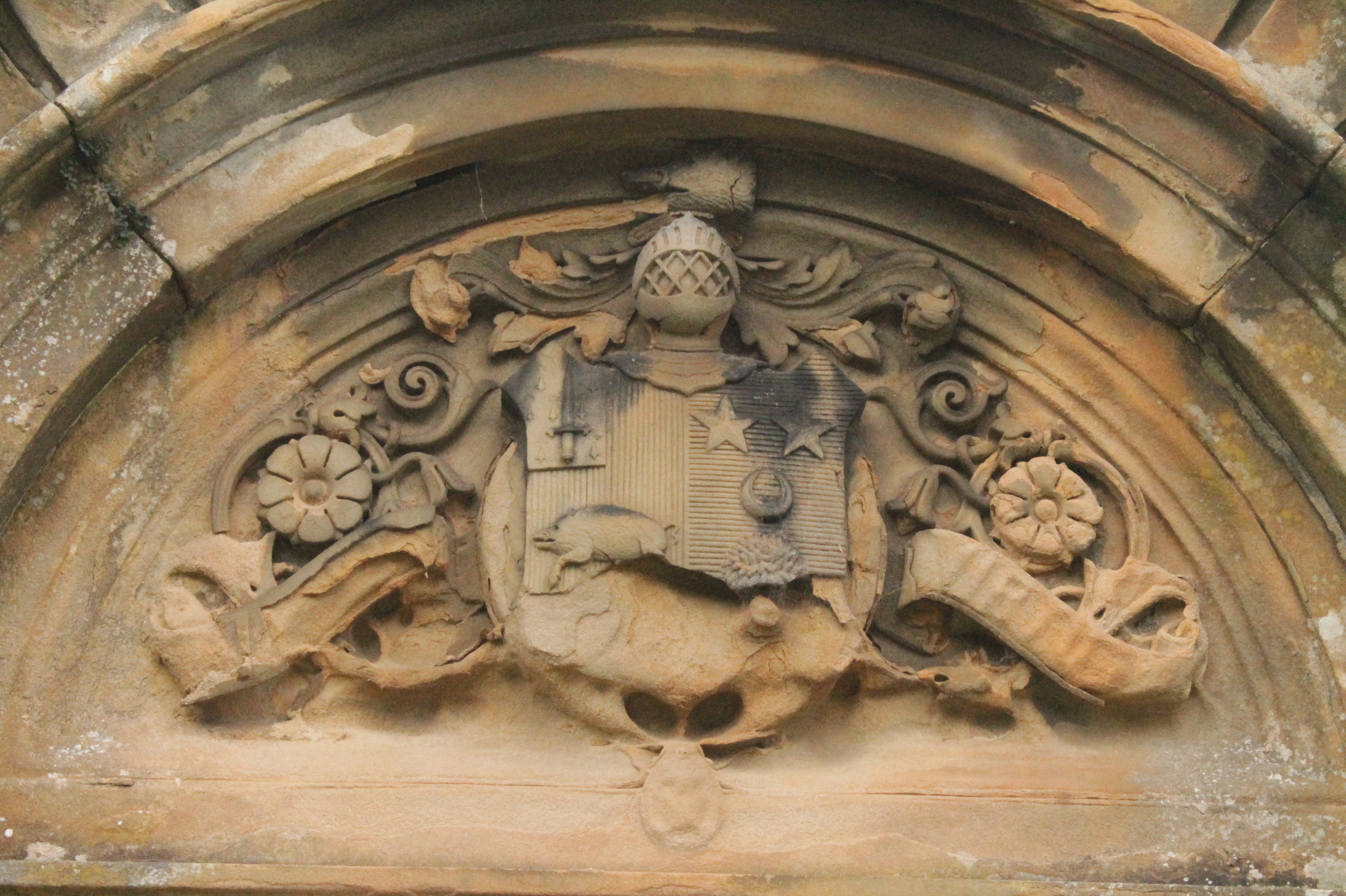
Coat of arms for Sir James Gardiner Baird, 7th Bt. of Saughtonhall impaling the Arms of Wauchope of Edmondstone to honour his wife — Grange Cemetery, Edinburgh

- Sir Robert Baird, 1st Baronet (died 1697)
- Sir James Baird, 2nd Baronet (died 1715)
- Sir Robert Baird, 3rd Baronet (c. 1690–1740)
- Sir David Baird, 4th Baronet (c. 1729–1745)
- Sir William Baird, 5th Baronet (d. 1771)
- Sir James Gardiner Baird, 6th Baronet (d. 1830)
- Sir James Gardiner Baird, 7th Baronet (1813–1896)
- Sir William James Gardiner Baird, 8th Baronet (1854–1921)
- Sir James Hozier Gardiner Baird, MC, 9th Baronet (1883–1966)
- Sir James Richard Gardiner Baird, MC, 10th Baronet (1913–1997)
- Sir (James) Andrew Gardiner Baird, 11th Baronet (1946–2024). His name appears on the Official Roll of the Baronetage, although his Who's Who page denies that. (1946–2024)
- Sir Alexander William Gardiner Baird, 12th Baronet (born 1986)

== Lyon Court petition ==
Robert Baird, the 1st Baronet, was a direct descendant of the House of Auchmedden Bairds, the seventh child of James Baird of Little Fiddes & Byth (c.1588–1655).In August 2019 Sir James petitioned the Lyon Court to matriculate the Arms of Auchmedden and request the honour of Chief of the Surname Baird. Delayed by the COVID-19 government lockdown in 2020, the process resumed in March 2022.

Both the Baird of Saughtonhall and the second Baird of Newbyth creations remain in the name of Baird and are extant as of 2022. Both baronetcies are descended from Andrew Baird who acquired lands of Auchmedden, Aberdeenshire, in 1534. The original Newbyth baronetcy was the senior cadet branch of Baird. At its extinction in 1745, Saughtonhall rose from junior to senior cadet branch of Baird. At the extinction of the Auchmedden line in 1806, Saughtonhall became the main line of Baird in Scotland, the line entitled to inherit the undifferenced Arms of Auchmedden.
