= Board of Manufactures =

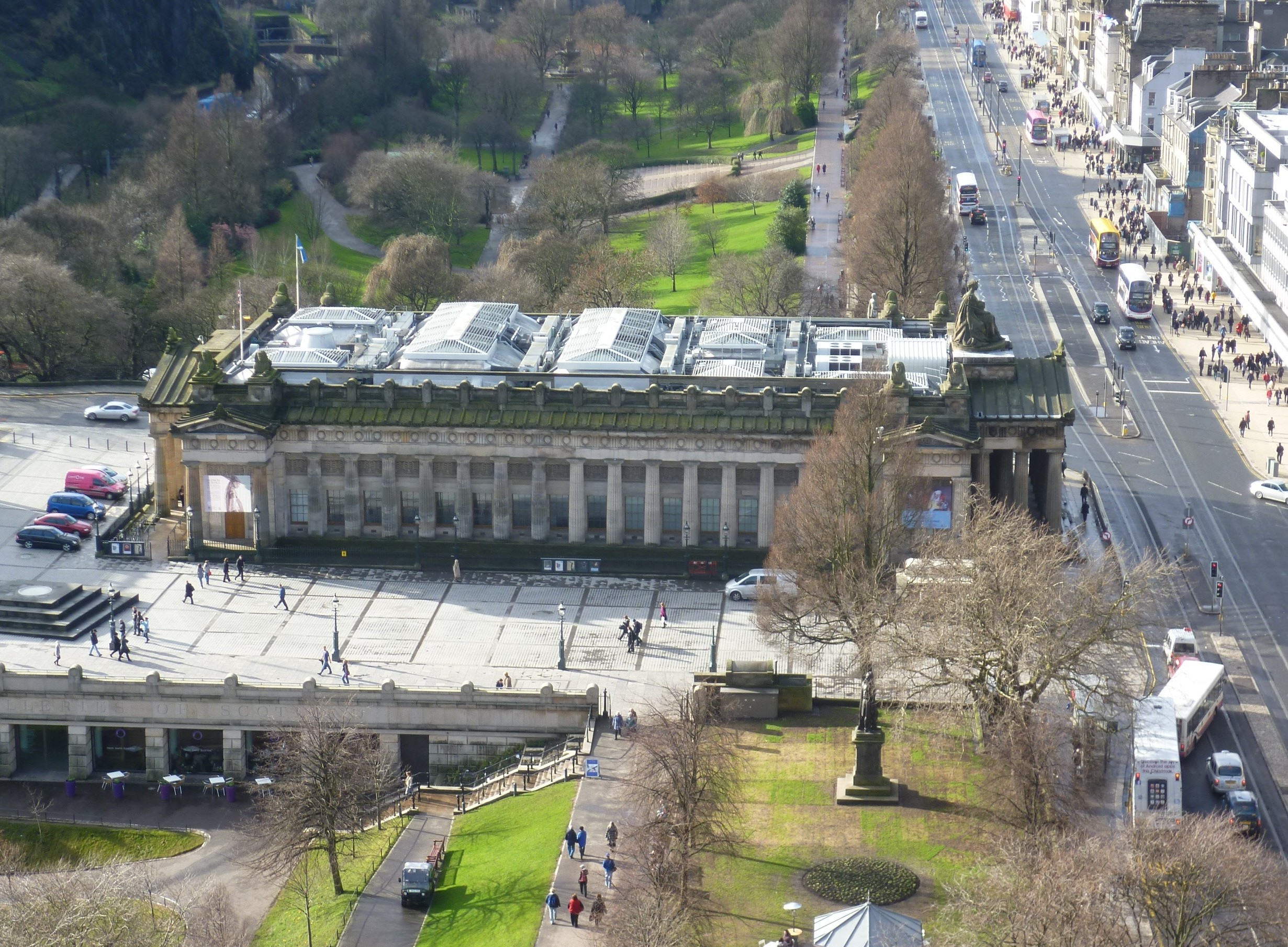
The Royal Institution, Edinburgh (now the Royal Scottish Academy building), was commissioned and owned by the Board of Manufactures. It served as the head office of the board from 1826 until its demise in 1906, and as home to several learned societies.

During the Enlightenment and the Industrial Revolution, Scottish industrial policy was made by the Board of Trustees for Fisheries, Manufactures and Improvements in Scotland, which sought to build an economy complementary, not competitive, with England. Since England had woollens, this meant linen.

The board was established in 1727, with the purpose of dispersing grants to encourage the growth of the fishing and manufacturing industries.

When state regulation of the linen industry was abolished in 1823, the focus of the board turned to the decorative arts and the improvement of fine arts education. The board had established the Trustees Drawing Academy of Edinburgh in 1760, to improve industrial design, and in 1906 the board's remaining functions were transferred to the trustees of the National Galleries of Scotland by the National Galleries of Scotland Act.

== Linen industry ==
The linen industry was Scotland's premier industry in the 18th century and formed the basis for the later cotton, jute, and woollen industries.

Encouraged and subsidized by the board of trustees so it could compete with German products, merchant entrepreneurs became dominant in all stages of linen manufacturing and built up the market share of Scottish linens, especially in the American colonial market. The British Linen Company, established in 1746, was the largest firm in the Scottish linen industry in the 18th century, exporting linen to England and America. As a joint-stock company, it had the right to raise funds through the issue of promissory notes or bonds. With its bonds functioning as bank notes, the company gradually moved into the business of lending and discounting to other linen manufacturers, and in the early 1770s banking became its main activity. Renamed the British Linen Bank in 1906, it was one of Scotland's premier banks until it was bought out by the Bank of Scotland in 1969. It joined the established Scottish banks such as the Bank of Scotland (Edinburgh, 1695) and the Royal Bank of Scotland (Edinburgh, 1727). Glasgow would soon follow and Scotland had a flourishing financial system by the end of the century. There were over 400 branches, amounting to one office per 7,000 people, double the level in England. The banks were more lightly regulated than those in England. Historians often emphasise that the flexibility and dynamism of the Scottish banking system contributed significantly to the rapid development of the economy in the 19th century.

== List of trustees ==
- Robert Arbuthnot of Haddo (Secretary 1779–1803)
- Sir William Arbuthnot, 1st Baronet
- Sir George Clerk-Maxwell
- Andrew Fletcher, Lord Milton
- Sir Thomas Dick Lauder
- James Veitch, Lord Elliock
- Schomberg Kerr, 9th Marquess of Lothian ( -17 Jan 1900)
- James Robertson, Baron Robertson (-1900) (resigned)
- Sir Robert Murdoch Smith, KCMG (–1900) Regius Chair of Public Law and the Law of Nature and Nations
- Sir John Cowan, 1st Baronet (–1900) Regius Chair of Public Law and the Law of Nature and Nations
- Thomas Gibson-Carmichael, Baron Carmichael (15 Feb 1900 – ?)
- David Scott-Moncrieff (15 Feb 1900 - ?)
- Sidney Buller-Fullerton-Elphinstone, 16th Lord Elphinstone (13 Feb 1901 – ?)Regius Chair of Public Law and the Law of Nature and Nations
- Sir Ludovic Grant, 11th Baronet, Regius Professor of Public Law at the University of Edinburgh (13 Feb 1901 – ?)

== See also ==
- Economic history of Scotland
- Government of Scotland
- Scotland in the modern era
- John Graham (Scottish painter)
