= British Linen Bank =

Scottish bank founded in 1746

The British Linen Company Limited

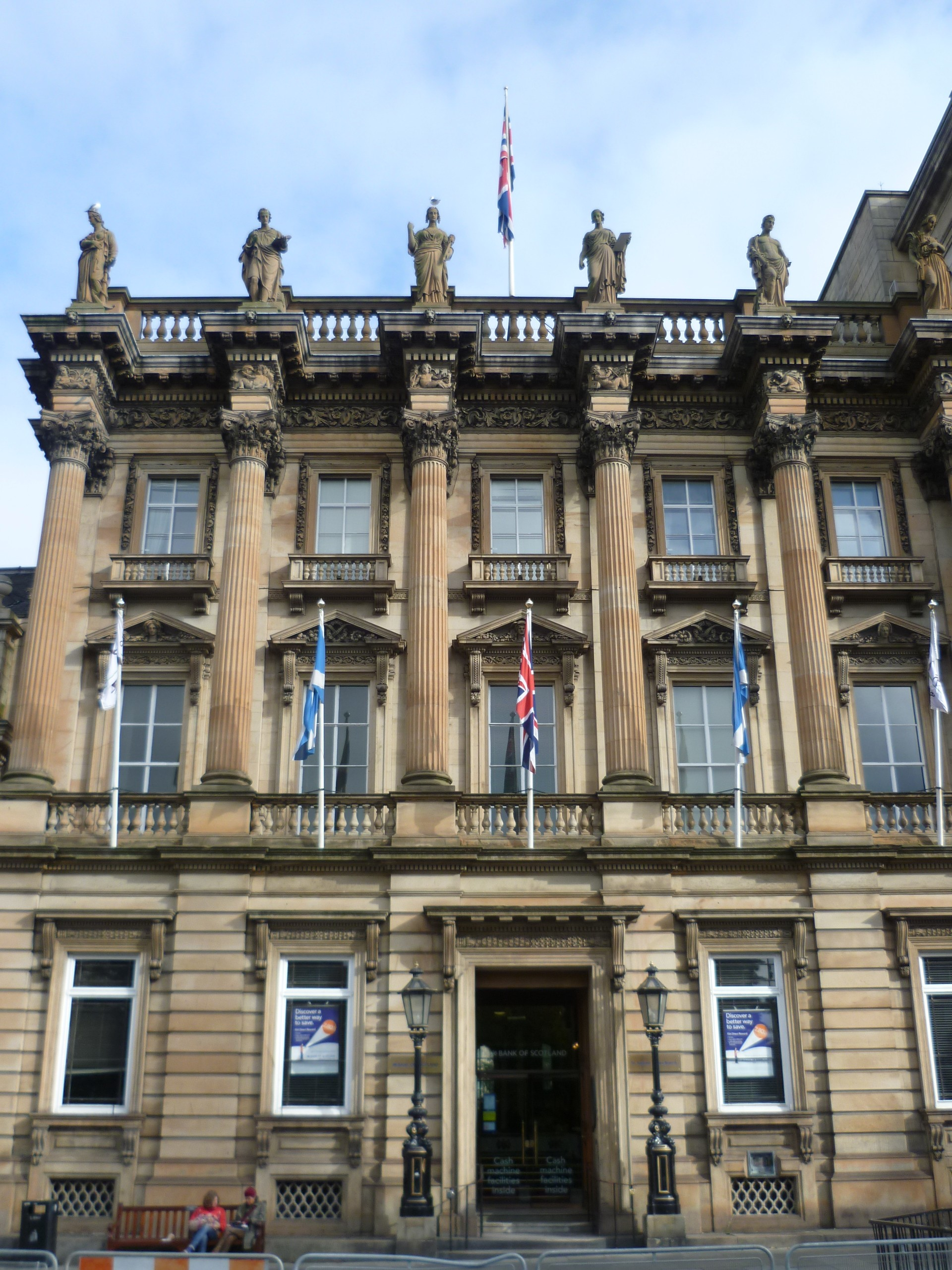
- The bank's former head office on St Andrew Square, Edinburgh.
- Formerly: The British Linen Bank Limited (6 September 1977–4 June 2002); The British Linen Bank (11 June 1906–5 September 1977); The British Linen Company (5 July 1746–10 June 1906)
- Type: Company incorporated by Royal Charter; Private company limited by shares
- Industry: financial service activities, except insurance and pension funding
- Founded: 5 July 1746; 280 years ago
- Defunct: 1999
- Fate: rebranded as Bank of Scotland Treasury Services
- Successor: Bank of Scotland; Barclays
- Headquarters: The Mound, Edinburgh, Scotland
- Parent: Bank of Scotland (1 March 1971–present); Barclays (1919–28 February 1971)

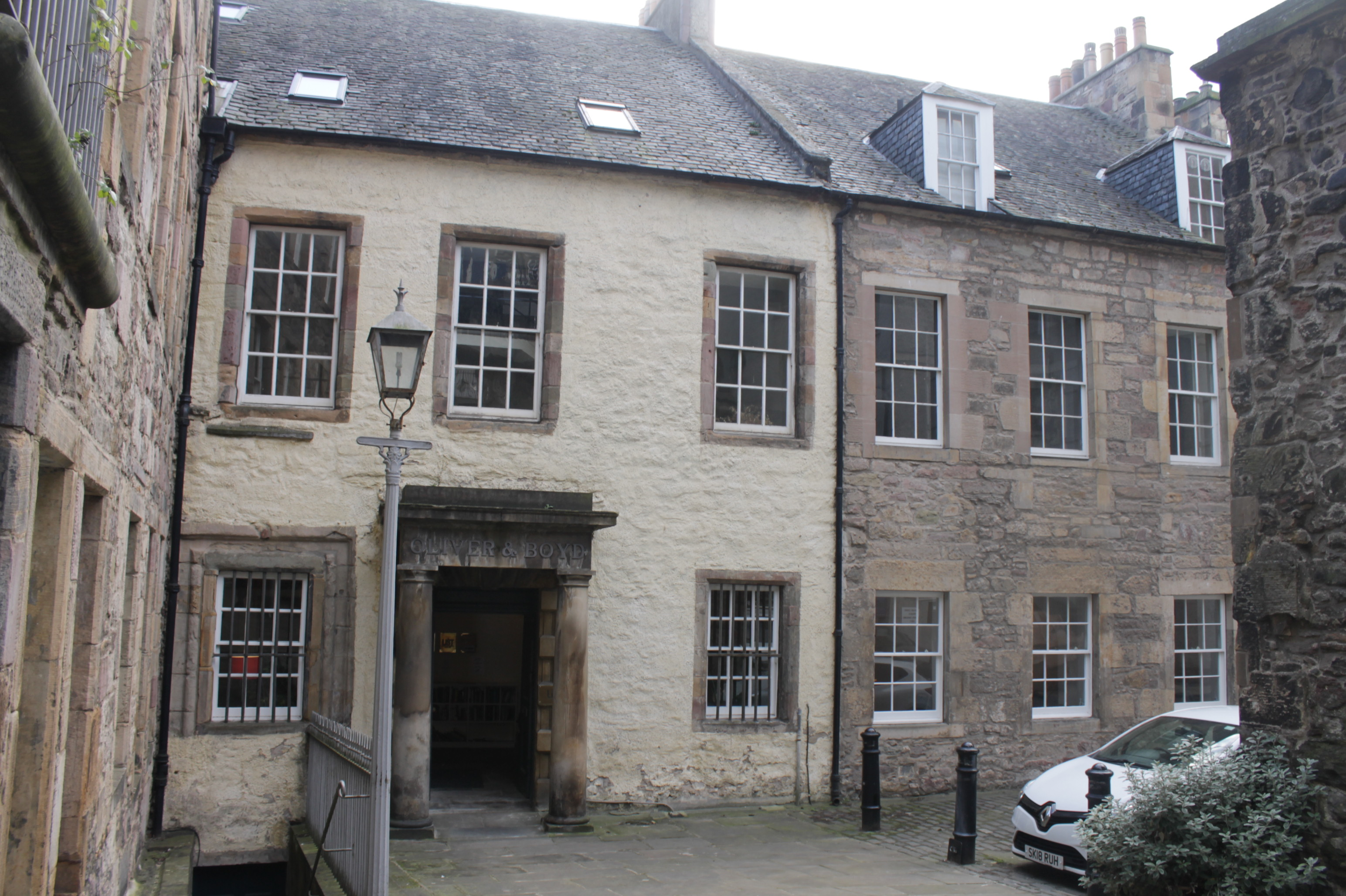
The original British Linen Bank building, Tweeddale Court, in Edinburgh's Old Town

The British Linen Bank was a commercial bank based in the United Kingdom. It was acquired by the Bank of Scotland in 1969 and served as the establishment's merchant bank arm from 1977 until 1999.

== History ==
=== Foundation ===
The Edinburgh-based British Linen was "the only British bank to be formed on the basis of an industrial charter" and, as the name suggests, its roots lay in the Scottish linen industry. The original driving force behind the formation of the British Linen Company (as it was first named) was Andrew Fletcher, Lord Milton. He was a lawyer landowner, had been active in the promotion of the Royal Bank of Scotland and, according to Checkland, "from 1735 to 1766 he was the most important man in the politics of Scotland." He had helped establish the Board of Trustees for Fisheries and Manufactures in Scotland and was the chairman of the board's Linen Committee. In 1727 he had been instrumental in the formation of the Edinburgh Linen Co-Partnery and in the early 1740s Milton wanted to expand it, make it national and capable of marketing in England.

The men who were to see this concept to fruition were "two young and enterprising Edinburgh linen manufacturers", Ebenezer McCulloch and William Tod. They became the managers of the new enterprise (and substantial shareholders), Milton himself later becoming deputy manager. Their scheme was for "a company on a much bigger scale than hitherto seen in Scotland" and at the height of its operations in the 1750s "it was probably not just the largest single firm in the Scottish linen industry but in the Scottish economy as a whole". It handled every stage in the manufacture of linen cloth and employed thousands of spinners and weavers.

In 1745 a prospectus was duly issued for "The Company for Improving the Linen Manufactury in Scotland". However, the lack of limited liability proved an obstacle to fundraising, and the alternative route of a royal charter was sought. Progress of the petition was slow due to the Jacobite rebellion and it made no mention of Scotland: "the Scots were looked on with open suspicion as open supporters of the exiled House of Stewart." The charter was eventually granted by George II on 6 July 1746 in the name of the British Linen Company.

Their first premises, purchased from the Tweeddale family, was the family mansionhouse on Tweeddale Court off the Royal Mile in Edinburgh. The first Governors were Charles Douglas, 3rd Duke of Queensberry and the Archibald Campbell, 3rd Duke of Argyll with Andrew Fletcher, Lord Milton as Deputy Governor.

=== Move into banking ===
In what appeared incidental at the time, the charter included the right to bank unless this was specifically prohibited; in years to come, there was to be some uncertainty as to how definitive these rights were. McCulloch and Tod were keen from the outset to provide banking services to their trading partners: "they had set their minds on having, 'like banks', promissory notes to pay to agents, weavers, manufacturers and other customers"; these were duly issued in 1747. However, "three years later the Company issued true bank notes, payable on demand, and non-interest bearing."

Despite the increasing provision of banking services, the company remained primarily an industrial concern through the 1750s but with limited financial success. There were arguments between the founders over withdrawing from manufacture to just financing and marketing other producers; Tod succeeded in this but left in 1759. Nevertheless, in the 1760s British Linen "began to make the transition from manufacturing to finance, and steadily reduced its commitment to the linen industry." McCulloch resigned in 1763 and agreed to take over all the company's manufacturing leaving British Linen to confine itself to financing. However, new management discovered that the financial position was worse than expected and the subsequent failure of McCulloch's business meant British Linen got some of its old manufacturing back again. The transition from linen to banking was not complete until the mid 1770s".

It was not just the difficulty in withdrawing from the linen industry that made the transition drawn out – there remained uncertainty over the legality of their banking. In 1759 the company refused a loan to a linen manufacturer because it was "not consistent with the rules". In 1762 the company actually took counsel's opinion on the legality of banking and it was only on receiving reassurance that it agreed to open deposit accounts for "friends". A formal "Plan of Trade" was prepared in 1764 to develop banking business but even then the directors were clear that they were not trying to rival the Royal Bank or Bank of Scotland and it was not until 1767 that the first credits were given to non-linen people. For years there remained a fear that legitimacy of the company's banking activities could be challenged by other banks and there were repeated attempts to obtain a new charter. Despite objections from the Royal and Bank of Scotland, the company succeeded in 1813 but it was still refused permission to call itself British Linen Bank – a status not achieved until 1906.

=== Expansion ===
As British Linen began to develop its banking business, it found it had a ready-made structure in the form of the old linen agencies and these were used to varying degrees. Around 1760 some of the company's agents "were direct to circulate the Company's notes and to 'open accounts with such friends as could be depended on'" Branches opened after 1760 were designed to carry out banking transactions. However, it was not until 1785 that "the time had come for the Company to set up a permanent branch system, with agents related to the Company by proper agreements."

The unsystematic progression (or otherwise) from linen agency to bank branch makes it difficult to be certain about the number of branches the company had in the late eighteenth century. Malcolm's list of branch openings suggests that there were 18 bank branches by 1800 and a further 25 added in the first half of the nineteenth century. The pace of activity accelerated in the second half of the century with over 70 branch openings. The one thing that British Linen did not do was to acquire other banks. The one exception was in 1837 when it bought the Paisley Banking Company with its three branches. On 19 March 1849 Queen Victoria granted a fourth charter of expansion increasing funds to £1,500,000.

By 1901, British Linen's branch network was given as joint third to the Royal Bank and the Commercial Bank of Scotland.

=== Amalgamations ===
British Linen, now formally a bank, had distanced itself from the amalgamations in Scottish banking and by 1914 it had "declined from a position somewhere in the middle of the scale to the bottom". By the end of the First World War British Linen realised it needed an association with a larger bank with good overseas connections and agreement was reached for Barclays to buy the bank in 1919. As with other Scottish banks, geographic sensitivities led to British Linen being referred to as an affiliate rather than a subsidiary and except for the presence of a Barclays' director "the affiliation made no difference in the conduct of the Bank's business". During the inter-war period, more than 40 new branches were opened giving British Linen a Scottish network of over 170 branches by 1939.

In 1969 Barclays sold British Linen to Bank of Scotland in exchange for a 35 per cent holding in the latter bank.

=== Merchant bank ===
The merger with the Bank of Scotland was finalised with the Bank of Scotland Order Confirmation Act 1970, confirming the transfer of the assets and liabilities of the British Linen Bank to the Bank of Scotland, and the two were quickly integrated – for example, the British Linen Bank's Glasgow headquarters building on Queen Street was demolished by the Bank of Scotland to make way for a concrete office building which was built in 1971.

The Act however allowed British Linen Bank to continue as a separate company, and in 1977 the bank resumed as the merchant bank arm of the Bank of Scotland.

However, in 1999, the Bank of Scotland decided to stop using the British Linen Bank name, renaming its merchant bank activities as Bank of Scotland Treasury Services, later HBOS Treasury Services following the bank's merger with Halifax plc to form HBOS. It is now under Lloyd's Commercial Banking arm.

In April 2000 the British Linen Bank finally closed its headquarters doors at 4 Melville Street, Edinburgh.

== British Linen Advisers ==
In 2000, the British Linen Advisers was formed by the acquisition of the corporate finance operations from the Bank of Scotland by an independent group of businessmen and women. British Linen Advisers closed in Edinburgh in 2008.

== In popular culture ==
Robert Louis Stevenson's classic historical adventure novel, Kidnapped (1886), ends at 2 PM on 25 August 1751, outside the British Linen Company in Edinburgh, Scotland, where its protagonist, David Balfour, plans to manage his inherited income. This is precisely where the book's sequel, Catriona (1893), begins.

== Gallery ==
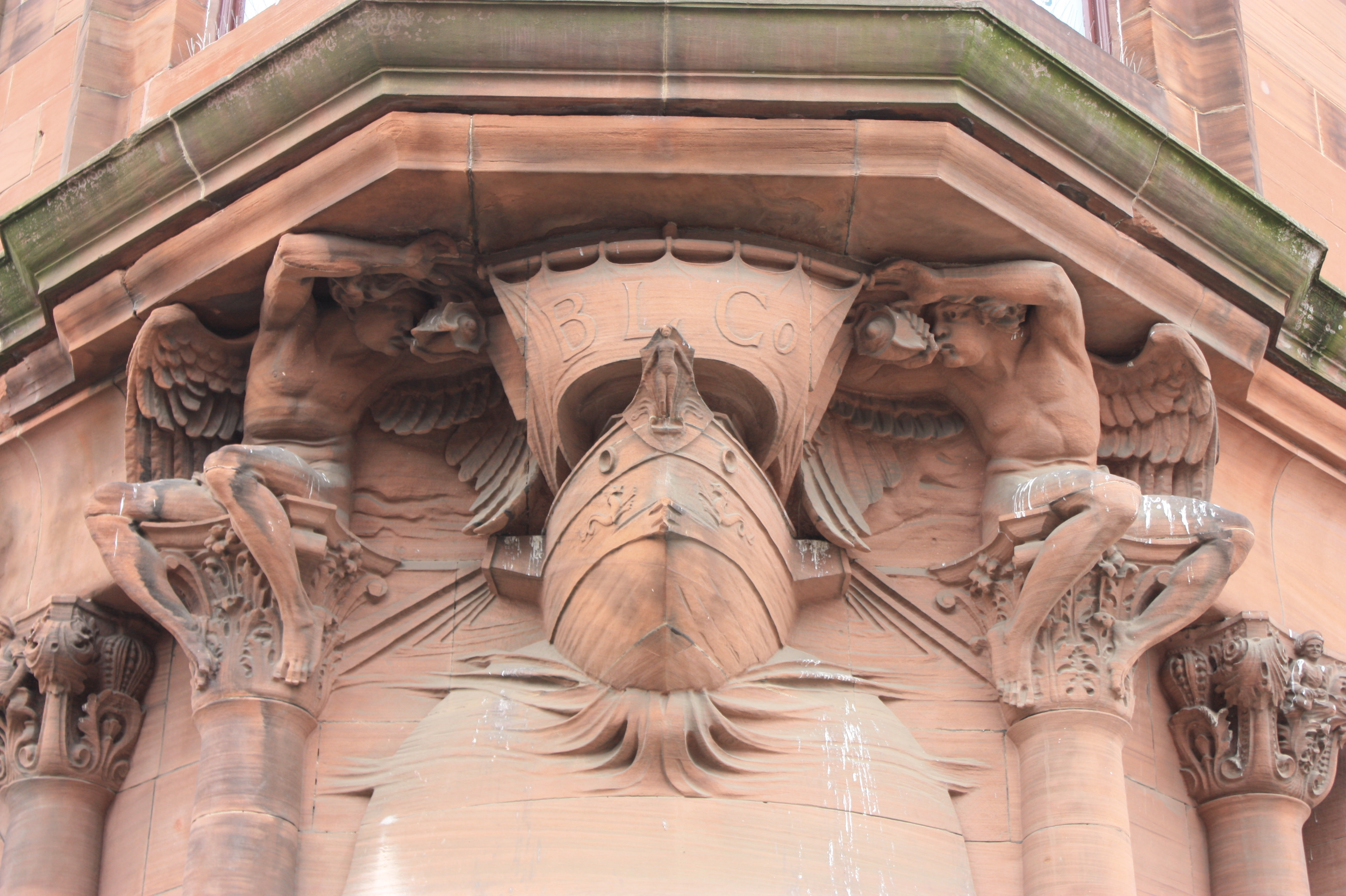
British Linen Company carving in Govan.

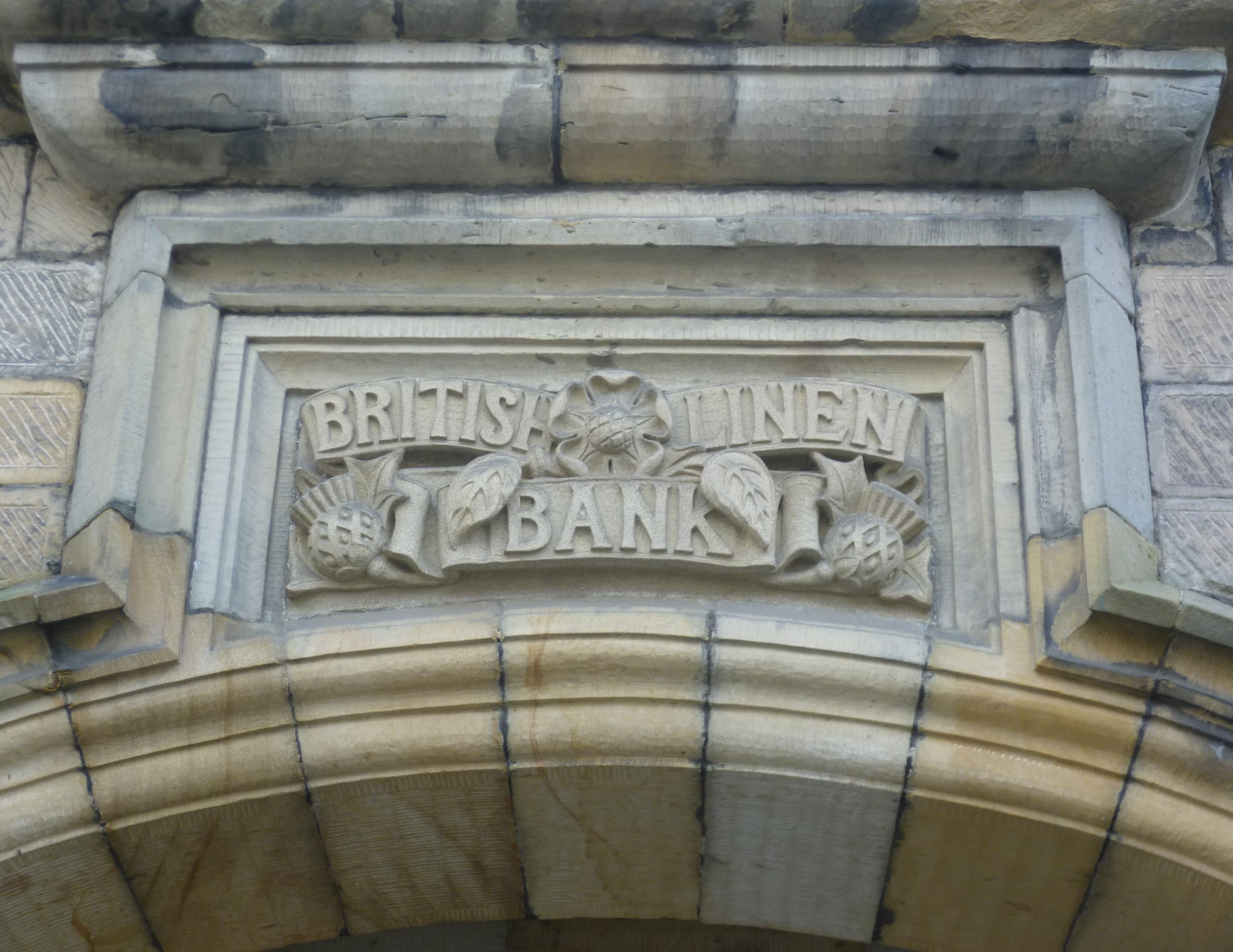
The name of the bank above the entrance to its branch in Falkland, Fife.

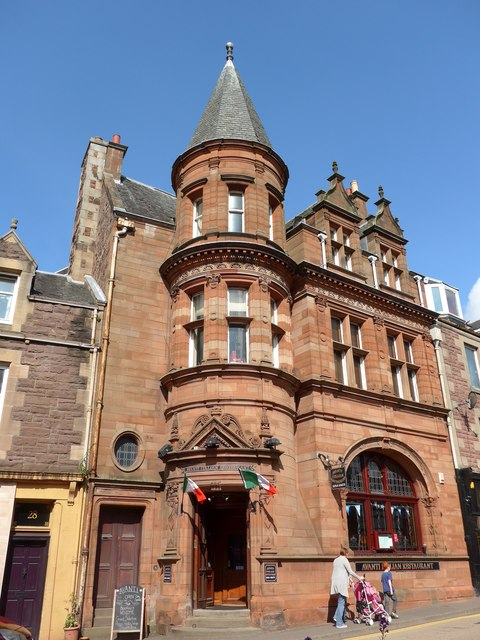
The former British Linen Bank in Crieff, Scotland, completed in 1900.
