= Sir James Baird, 2nd Baronet =

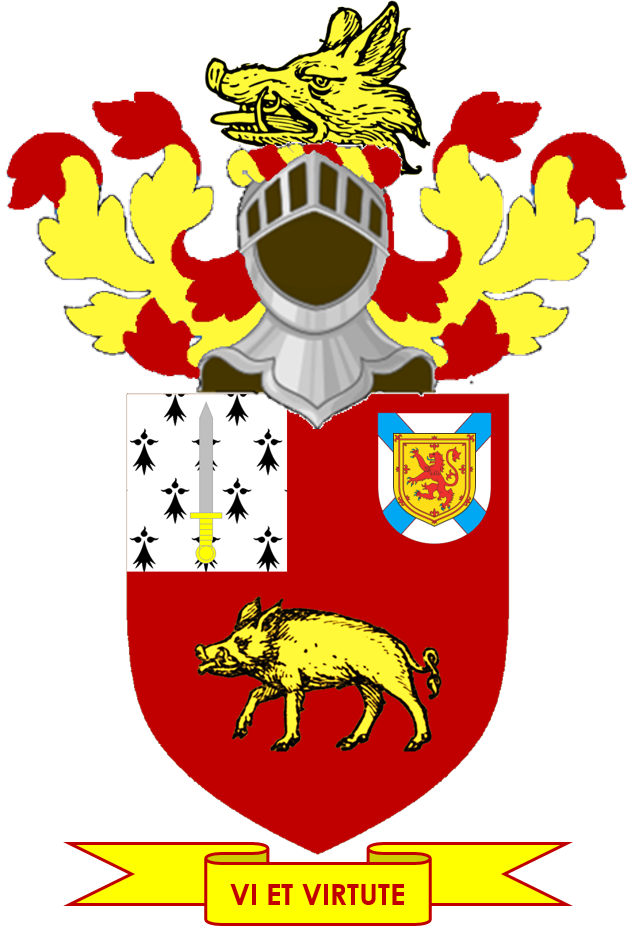
Arms of Saughton Hall: Gules a Sanglier passant Or on a Canton Ermine a Sword paleways proper; Crest: A Boar's Head erased Or: Motto: Vi et virtute (By strength and valour)

Sir James Baird, 2nd Baronet, of Saughtonhall (c. 1658 – 1715) was a baronet.

== Life ==
The son of Sir Robert Baird, 1st Baronet of Saughtonhall, and Elizabeth Fleming, he became baronet in 1697 on the death of his father, in 1712 entailing the lands of Saughtonhall. The strathspey "Sir James Baird" is believed to be named in his honour.

=== Marriages ===
Children by his first marriage, to Margaret Hamilton, include Sir David, Sir William and Sir Robert, in turn the third, fourth and fifth baronets.

Children by his second marriage to Elizabeth Gibson include Patrick Baird who in 1740–44 as a lieutenant on the ship Gloucester took place in a circumnavigation of the world as a part of George Anson's voyage around the world.

Baronetage of Nova Scotia
Preceded by Robert Baird	Baronet (of Saughton Hall); 1697–1715	Succeeded by Robert Baird
