= Sir Robert Baird, 1st Baronet =

Scottish merchant, landowner and investor

Sir Robert Baird (1630–1697) was a Scottish merchant, landowner, and investor in colonial enterprise in the Province of Carolina.

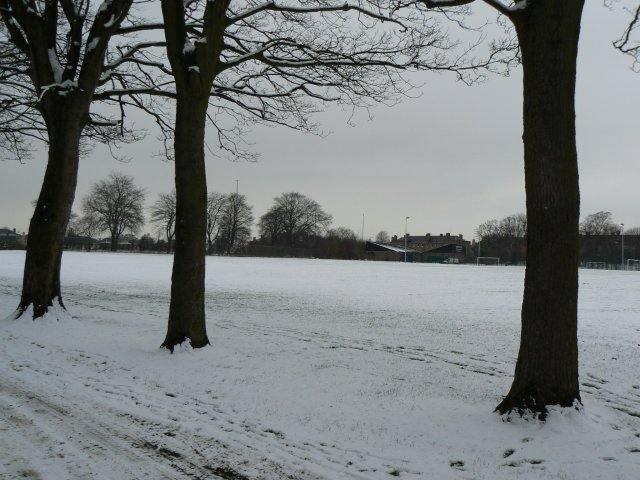
The grounds of Baird's Saughtonhall are now a public park.

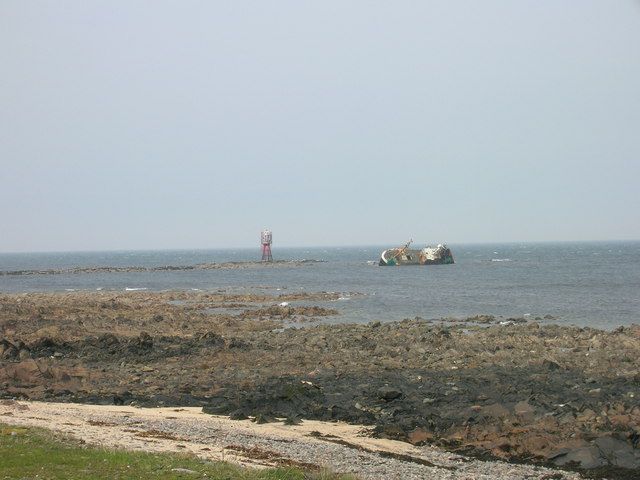
The Hope foundered on the sands of Cairnbulg near Fraserburgh in October 1669.

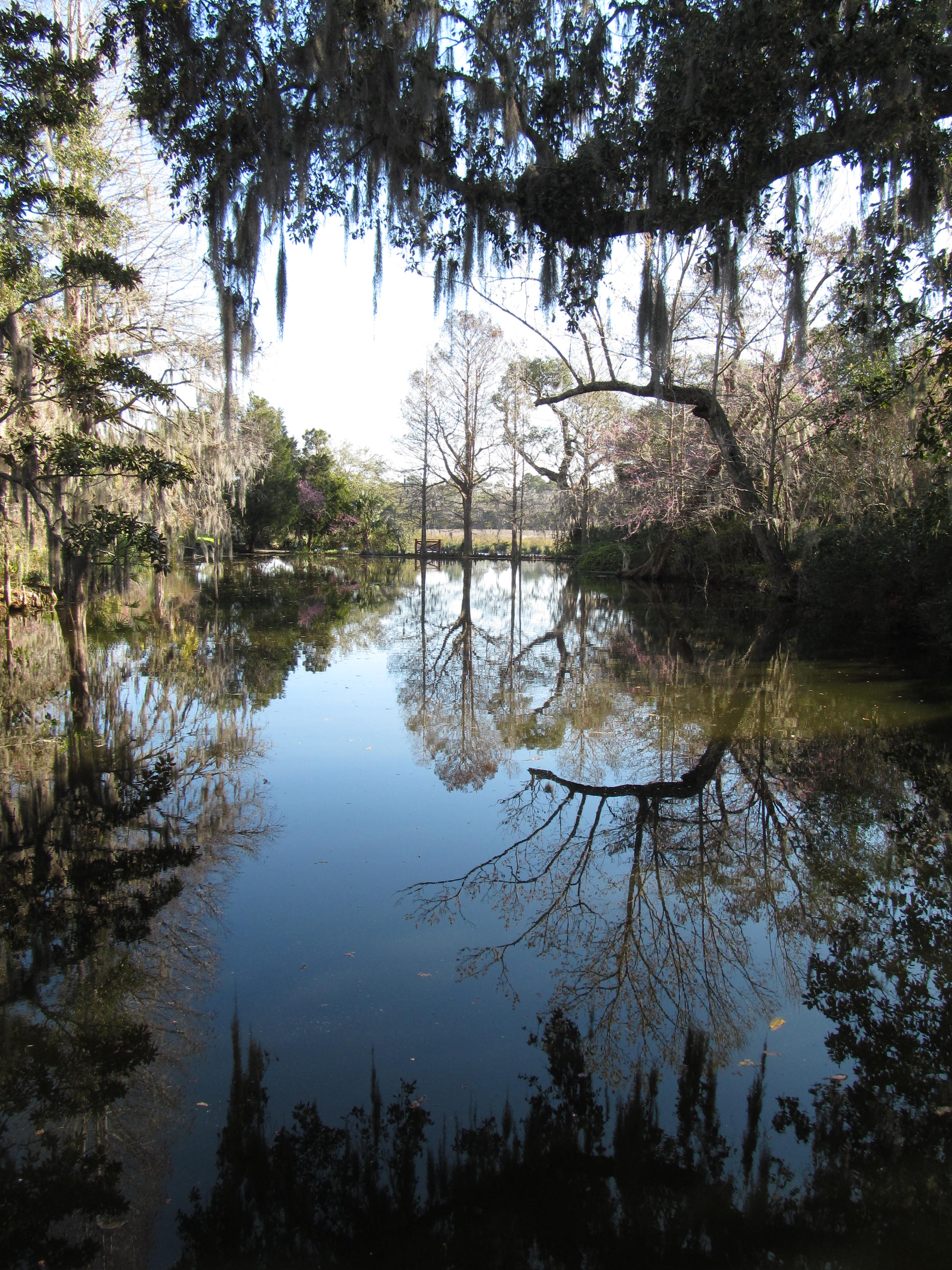
Robert Baird and the partners of the Carolina Society sent Patrick Crawford to map the Ashley River.

== Family background ==
He was a son of James Baird, a lawyer and a younger son of Gilbert Baird of Auchmedden, and Bathia Dempster. Auchmeddan Castle is near Fraserburgh. His aunt Margaret Baird married James Harvey of the Ward of Kinmundy and is an ancestor of the Harvey family who owned plantations in Antigua and Grenada.

== Career ==
Robert Baird became a merchant in Edinburgh. Baird acquired the estate of Saughtonhall to the west of Edinburgh in around 1665 from Janet Moodie, wife of a merchant Alexander Maxwell. Maxwell was a son of the religious writer Margaret Cunningham. The old mansion of Saughtonhall was demolished in 1954, and the grounds are now the public Saughton Park.

Baird's apprentices included, in 1665, Hugh Campbell, a son of Hugh Campbell of Cessnock. His older brother, George Campbell was a founder of the Scottish Carolina Company.

Baird was Dean of Guild in Edinburgh in 1674 and sent convicted persons to work in the Correction House spinning and carding wool under the supervision of Robert Stansfield, a member of a textile making family from Wakefield in West Yorkshire. Stansfield was murdered by his son Philip in November 1687.

Baird was a copartner of the Leith Sugar House founded in 1677, and a part-owner of a privateer ship or frigate, the Bruce of Pittenweem.

In May 1685 Baird was a member of committee appointed to order provisions for the army. The committee directed the architect and Surveyor and Overseer of the Royal Works, James Smith to build storage "girnels" for oatmeal in the Palace at Stirling Castle and at Dumbarton Castle and Edinburgh Castle.

Baird is said to have owned a house in Warriston Close off the Royal Mile in Edinburgh which had formerly belonged to Lewis Craig and Archibald Johnston, Lord Warriston.

He was made a baronet of Nova Scotia in February 1695. Robert Baird died in March 1697 and was buried in Greyfriars kirkyard.

=== The wreck of the Hope ===
In November 1666, the Burgh Council of Edinburgh asked Robert Baird to consult on Captain Tennent's bill to transport vagabonds to Virginia. In 1669 Robert Baird was a partner with the architect William Bruce and others in a planned voyage to New York with two ships, the Hope and the James of Leith. The owners of the Hope planned to transport "strong and idle beggars, vagabonds, egyptians, common and notorious whores, thieves and other dissolute and loose persons" voluntarily recruited from prisoners held in the tolbooths of Scotland. They would be settlers in Virginia, having opted for a form of penal transportation. The Hope was wrecked at Cairnbulg, at the "watermouth of Philorth" on 9 October 1669.

=== Carolina and slavery ===
Robert Baird was a partner and investor in the Carolina Society. Baird was the cashier or cash-keeper of the Carolina project in 1682. Potential investors (undertakers) were invited to send Baird £10 Sterling for a 100 acre stake with another £10 for administration fees.

Baird issued money to settlers, mostly recruited in south-west Scotland, and to Patrick Crawford, a mariner who was sent to Carolina to make a survey and map of the coast and area around the Ashley River for the undertakers or investors. A ship, the James of Irvine, was chartered by the Society for the expedition leader John Crawford. The project was a business venture with significant religious motivation. Investors were encouraged that the colony might have its own government and "wee might haive Presbytery estaiblished".

This scheme was abandoned partly as an indirect result of the discovery of the Rye House Plot, as some of the undertakers and partners of the Carolina Company including John Cochrane of Ochiltree, George Campbell of Cessnock, and Patrick Hume of Polwarth fell under suspicion. It was alleged that the plotters had written a letter to Cochrane disguised as Carolina business, and that Algernon Sidney was behind a visit by Aaron Smith to Carolina Company members in Scotland.

In 1683 Patrick Crawford claimed for non-payment from Baird for the expenses of sounding "the best river in Carolina". Baird was a Bailie, a position on Edinburgh burgh council, and in October 1683 Sir James Fleming proposed he should stand down, because his role as Cashkeeper to the Carolina Company might bring suspicion of the council's involvement in the Rye House plot. Baird had a quarrel with James Rocheid, which was played out during the burgh council elections this year.

In 1684, a short-lived Scottish colony was founded called "Stuarts Town" possibly near Beaufort, South Carolina or Port Royal Island. The settlement was named after Catherine Stuart, wife of Henry Erskine, 3rd Lord Cardross, a Covenanter and leader of the Scottish immigrants. The colonists enlisted the support of Yamasee people against nearby Spanish colonies, and were defeated by Spanish forces. One of the Scots colonists, William Dunlop, negotiated with a Yamasee leader Matamaha and in May 1686 recommended the importation of enslaved African people from Barbados. Dunlop, who later became the Principal of the University of Glasgow, helped establish cotton plantations, and also sold runaway slaves to the Spanish for pieces of eight. Stuarts Town was destroyed by the Spanish in August 1686. Scots in Carolina continued to attempt to persuade the Yamasee both to fight the Spanish and to work on their settlements.

== Marriage and children ==
Baird married Elizabeth Fleming (died 1676), a daughter of Malcolm or Michael Fleming of Ratho Byres. Their children included:

- Sir James Baird (died 1715)
- John Baird, who was a merchant in Gdańsk
- Alexander Baird, who settled in New York
- Robert Baird, Governor of Dutch Surinam
- Bathia Baird, who married Robert Barclay of Pierston or Perceton, Ayrshire, near Irvine.
- Margaret Baird, who married Patrick Hume of Renton and Coldingham.
- Mary Baird, who married Robert Watson of Muirhouse. Their daughter Elizabeth Watson (died 1734) married Robert Dundas of Arniston in 1712.
- Elizabeth Baird, who married the advocate David Cunningham of Milncraig (died 1708).
