= Leith Sugar House =

Scottish manufacturing company founded 1677

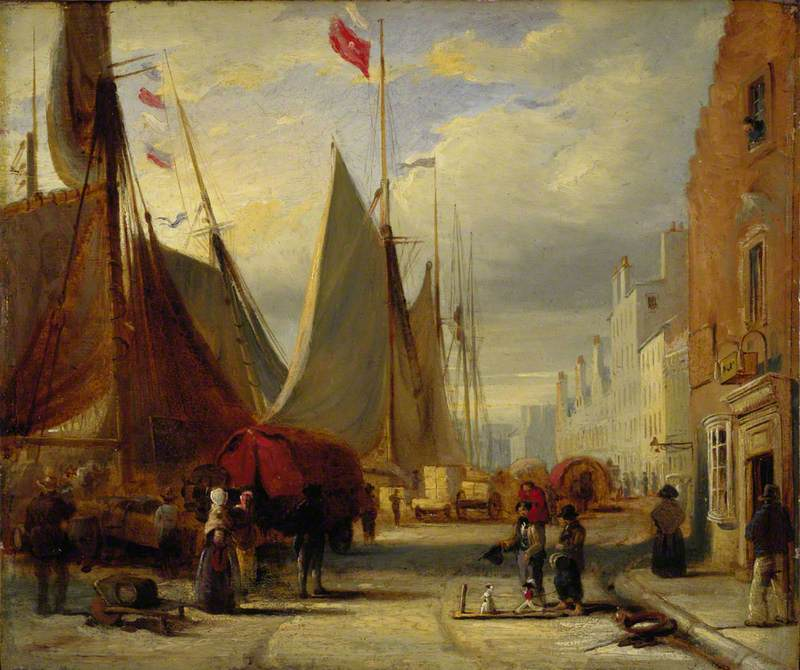
Leith is a port near Edinburgh where several new industries were sited in the 17th and 18th centuries.

The first Leith Sugar House was established in 1677 by Robert Douglas and partners. Between 1667 and 1701 four sugar boiling and rum-distilling enterprises were established in Scotland, three in Glasgow and one in Leith. The financial success of the Leith Sugar house in the seventeenth and eighteenth century demonstrates Edinburgh's economic connection to the Atlantic economy and enslaved labour.

== Robert Douglas, elder and younger ==
=== Family connections ===
Robert Douglas elder (died 1736) was the son of William Douglas of Blackmiln, kirk minster of Aboyne, son of an Aberdeen merchant, and Marjory, a daughter of John Ross, Minister of Birse. The family claimed descent from Archibald Douglas of Glenbervie. Robert Douglas was known as Robert Douglas of Cruixton or Cruckstown, and he became Robert Douglas of Blackmill.

Robert Douglas (elder and younger) were relations of Anna Douglas, Lady Boghall, a companion of Anne Home, Countess of Lauderdale, who left a legacy to them. John Hamilton of Boghall, who was a resident in Leith in 1644, is known is have had an interest in the tobacco trade and chartering a ship to the West Indies.

=== Indweller in Leith ===
Robert Douglas was a merchant burgess of Edinburgh but lived and traded as an "indweller in Leith". As a "soap boiler" Robert Douglas made and sold soap. Some soap was made from fish and whale oil. The Douglas soap business is thought to have been the direct successor of Nathaniel Udwart's concession. Udwart's family is remembered by the name of a bar and venue in Edinburgh, "Nicol Edward's". Robert Douglas sold a firkin of soap to a landowner and merchant John Clerk of Penicuik for £11 Scots in February 1666, striking the bargain at the door of the shop or booth of another Leith merchant, David Boyd. A Margaret Douglas, who worked for Clerk, may have been his daughter. Clerk's accounts include a variety of sugar products bought for his own household, but do not name the retailers. In December 1667, Clerk bought a "Barbados sugar loaf".

It was recognised that "sugar boiling", the refining process, was a fire hazard. In May 1677, an Edinburgh confitmaker, Thomas Douglas, was forbidden to boil his own sugar in a cellar workshop in Tailfer's Close to make confectionery, as the potential "occasion of sudden fire in the heart of the town". This measure would also help establish the Leith works as the sole regional maker of refined sugar.

=== Investors and employees ===
A sugar house requires a number of ovens and some specialised equipment to run at capacity. Robert Douglas had a number of partners to help finance his sugar start-up, along with any family capital and the profits of the other family businesses. Robert Baird of Sauchtonhall (1630-1697) was one of the merchant partners. Some of Baird's papers concerning his 1677 "copartnery" in the Leith "suggarie" survive, along with records of his involvement in the Carolina Company or Society and its failed colony at Stuart Town.

Robert Douglas elder employed a factor, David Forrester, to run the sugar business in Leith. It was known as "The Leith Succar Work Company". They sought an expert in sugar boiling and refining in the Netherlands, employed an English sugar boiler, and eventually in 1680 found a workman willing to come to Leith from Hamburg. At first, all the partly-refined sugar processed at Leith came from London, and had originated in the West Indies and Barbados.

Analysis of port books, recording imports received at Leith, show that the amount of already refined sugar arriving dwindled in the first three years of the Douglas sugar house. This seems to demonstrate that the operation was then a commercial success. However, surviving letters show that the Leith Sugar House was not yet fully exploiting the resource by distilling molasses to make rum in the years 1677 to 1683. The sugar houses in Glasgow were making rum by 1678.

=== Sugar from the Caribbean ===
Some unprocessed sugar may have come to Leith directly from Barbados and the Leeward Islands. In the 1660s, Captain Edward Burd (or Baird) transported Scottish convicts from the tolbooth of Edinburgh to work in Barbados. He brought back sugar and tobacco, but the cargo of his Hopeful Margaret of Leith was lost when the ship was impressed by Francis Willoughby to fight with the English government navy. Edward Burd was badly injured in a sea battle with the French in 1666 at "Todosantes", but recovered from a gunshot wound to the head. Unlike Douglas, who had merchant burgess status, Burd was not permitted to deal in wine, and his new Leith chandlery business was strictly regulated to ensure he did not undercut existing shops and manufacturers.

Sugar plantations had English owners and some Scottish staff, and in the 1670s a Glasgow merchant William Colquhoun was settled on Saint Kitts. By around 1695, a Scot with an Edinburgh heritage, William McDowall, began managing a sugar plantation on Nevis as a slave overseer. He was able to develop his own plantations after the Acts of Union 1707.

=== Rum, ale, coal, and other businesses ===
Robert Douglas was described as a "soap boiler" in February 1684 when he was appointed a Master of the Hospital, Trinity House of Leith, in place of a Leith vintner, who also called Robert Douglas. The vintner was also the Shore Baillie of Leith, and he sold brandy and sack to Clerk of Penicuik.

In 1695, Robert Douglas, junior and senior, described as soap boilers in Leith, were investors in the Company of Scotland, the venture known as the Darien scheme. In 1695, the Parliament of Scotland recognised their flourishing trade with Greenland and Russia, and the setting up of soap and sugar works, and their plans for making porcelain. They were permitted privileges to make earthenware and distill rum.

In 1703 Douglas applied to Privy Council for recognition for a manufactory "to be erected and set up" as a "Suggar work at Leith and a sullarie for distilling of Rhum". The Leith sugar house received partly-refined sugar produced by enslaved labourers on plantations in the Caribbean via London and produced loaf, powder sugar, candy, molasses and rum.

The Douglas business portfolio was diverse. Douglas was in touch with merchants in Hamburg, via Andrew Russell in Rotterdam and his own expert sugar refiner, and shipped coal to them. Douglas processed and barrelled 23 porpoises stranded on the sands at Cramond Island in February 1690. Robert Douglas, the younger, a son of Robert Douglas and Helen Hunter, had a brewery at Coitfield, near Leith, or at the "Coatfield Land" in Leith. In December 1709 he fought a legal challenge that he should pay a duty on his ale-making as if his brewery was in Edinburgh.

A Swedish traveller, Henry Kalmeter, described Robert Douglas's Leith soap works in 1720, apparently situated in Rotten Row. The adjacent sugar house was now operated by Richard Morrow (or Murray) and partners. Sugar from Barbados was shipped to Glasgow and carted to Leith for refining and casting into sugarloafs and sugar syrup distilled into rum. The Douglas interest in sugar in Leith seems to have ended around 1725. Robert Douglas younger acquired an estate called Brockhouse. In the 1740s he converted his Coatfield premises into barracks for soldiers.

== Later history of sugar in Leith ==
There was a recapitalization of the industry in 1751 as the Edinburgh Sugar House Company, trading with the "sugar colonies of British American Plantations". A new Leith Sugar House started in 1757 ceased trading in 1762. Adolphus Happel, who had married Amelia Gray in 1754, was described as a Leith sugar boiler in 1763 and 1766.

A "New Edinburgh Sugar Company" founded in 1771 also ran into difficulty. Sugar was obtained at enormous human cost, and it can be argued that the industry in financial terms was not conspicuously profitable or a driver for Industrial Revolution and the growth of other sectors of the economy.

In the nineteenth century raw sugar continued to be imported from Jamaica for processing in Leith by William MacFie and Co. of the Leith Sugar House in Elbe Street and the Leith Sugar Refining Co. in Coburg Street.
