= Saughton Park =

Public park in Edinburgh, Scotland

Coordinates: 55°56′05″N 3°14′59″W

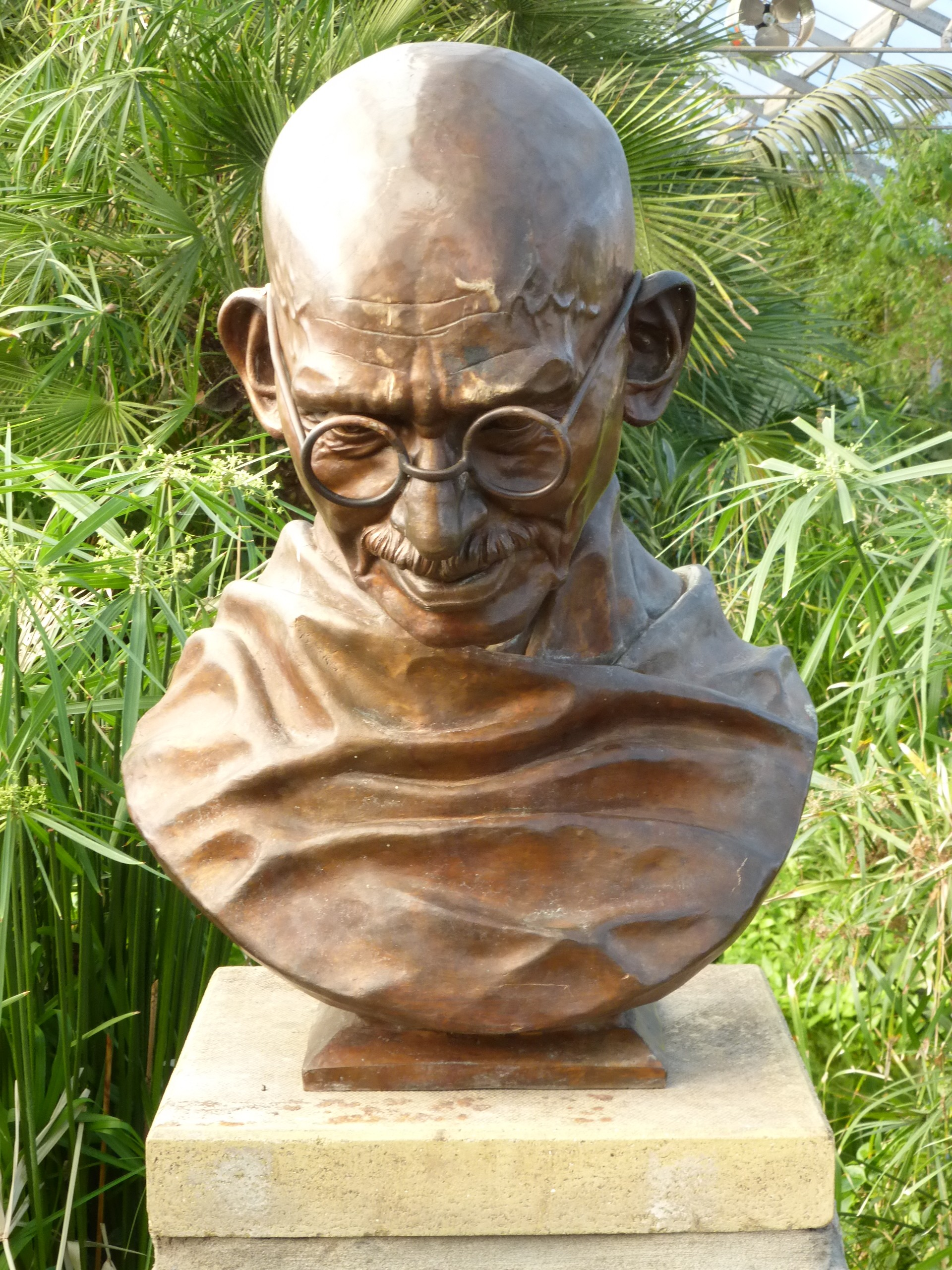
Bust of Mahatma Gandhi, Saughton Park, Edinburgh

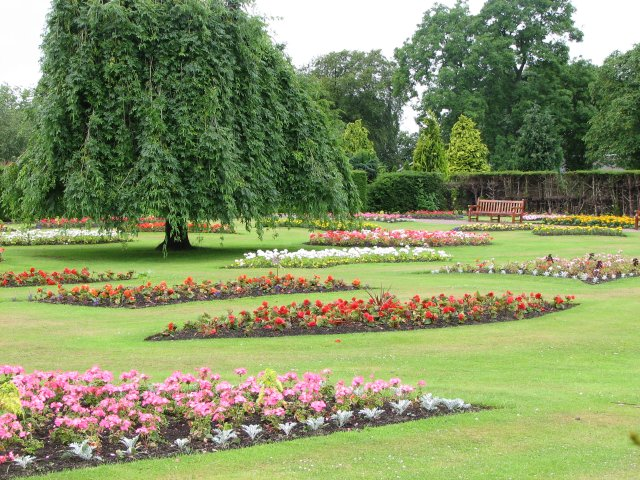
Saughton Park

Saughton Park is a public park in Edinburgh, Scotland. It includes formal gardens, specimen trees, exotic plant greenhouses, a cafe, a bandstand, playing fields, an athletics track, a skateboard park and a creative play area. The skatepark was constructed in 2010 and is the largest in Scotland.

== Facilities ==
The park benefitted from an £8m restoration with funding from the National Lottery, and cycling lobby group Sustrans amongst others. The park was awarded Green Flag in 2020. The redevelopment work was developed to include the restoration of key historic features, enhance accessibility and provide visitor facilities. Conservation, sustainability and biodiversity formed an integral part of the masterplan. Garden and building restoration work was done to give an understanding of the heritage, context, place quality and future use the Park. Local community groups were involved in consultation and co-design. The park is well known for its rose gardens and provision of new facilities including community teaching areas, a café and toilets. The new facilities are of a modern design. The restoration of heritage assets included repairs to the walled garden, reinstatement of the wrought iron bandstand and the renovation of the winter gardens glasshouse. The bandstand which had been removed in 1987 due to its condition was made in the Lion Foundry in Kirkintilloch in 1909. The glasshouse features a bust of Gandhi, tropical plants and a statue of the Goddess Sakthi. The replanting of the restored gardens required more than 5,000 hedging plants, 8,000 herbaceous plants, roses worth more than £40,000 for the rose garden. 5,000 plants were added around the bandstand. The herbaceous border has 6,000 plants, including 350 purple allium.

In addition, several species of bird nest in the park and otters have been seen in the river and the skatepark.

== History ==
The park has been managed by City Of Edinburgh Council since 1900 when it was purchased from Sir William Baird and it opened to the public in 1910. It previously included a nine-hole golf course, nursery and playing fields.

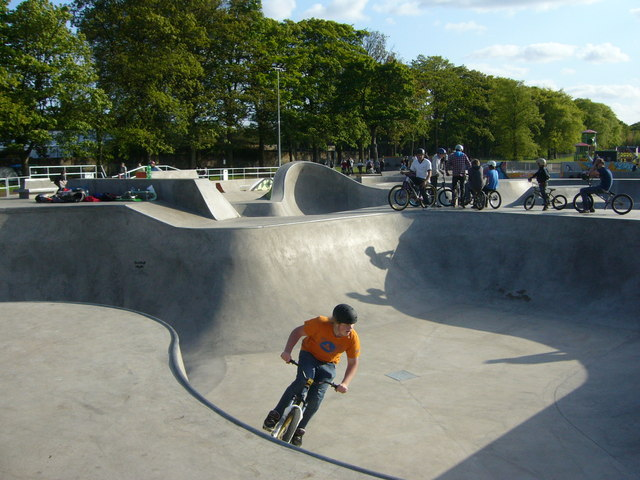
Saughton Skatepark BMXer

Saughton park was formerly the Saughton Hall Estate, bought in the 1660s by Robert Baird of Saughtonhall, an Edinburgh merchant, from Janet Mudie or Moodie. The park was the site of the 1908 great Scottish National Exhibition and the grounds were specially adapted for the purpose. Large buildings were constructed, a railway station was built to transport thousands of visitors from Waverley Station, and a new bridge was built for the Water of Leith. The exhibition included industrial and machinery exhibits along with halls featuring Canadian, Russian and Irish showcases. It also featured a Senegalese village "where the inhabitants may be seen carrying on their daily life much as they would do under their own tropical skies". The exhibition followed a previous similar one in the Meadows and was open for six months, attracting nearly 3.5 million visitors.
