= Economic history of Scotland =

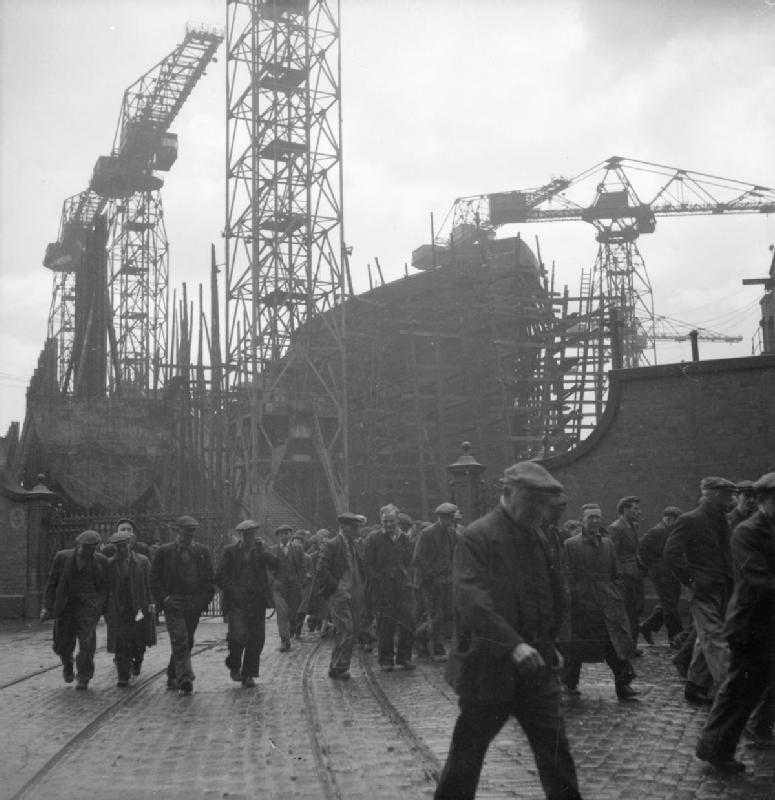
Glasgow shipyard in 1944

The economic history of Scotland charts economic development in the history of Scotland from earliest times, through seven centuries as an independent state and following Union with England, three centuries as a country of the United Kingdom.

Before 1700 Scotland was a poor rural area, with few natural resources or advantages, remotely located on the periphery of the European world. Outward migration to England, and to North America, was heavy from 1700 well into the 20th century. After 1800 the economy took off, and industrialized rapidly, with textile, coal, iron, railroads, and most famously shipbuilding and banking. Glasgow was the centre of the Scottish economy.

After the end of the First World War in 1918, Scotland went into a steady economic decline, shedding thousands of high-paying engineering jobs, and having very high rates of unemployment especially in the 1930s. Wartime demand in the Second World War temporarily reversed the decline, but conditions were difficult in the 1950s and 1960s. The discovery of North Sea oil in the 1970s brought new wealth, and a new cycle of boom and bust, even as the old industrial base had decayed.

Since the end of World War II, Scotland has shrunk as a share of the British economy, falling from 9.3% of the UK total in 1948 to 7.5% in 2018. For most of the period after first production of North Sea oil and gas, Scotland has had higher gross value added per capita than the UK.

== Earliest times ==
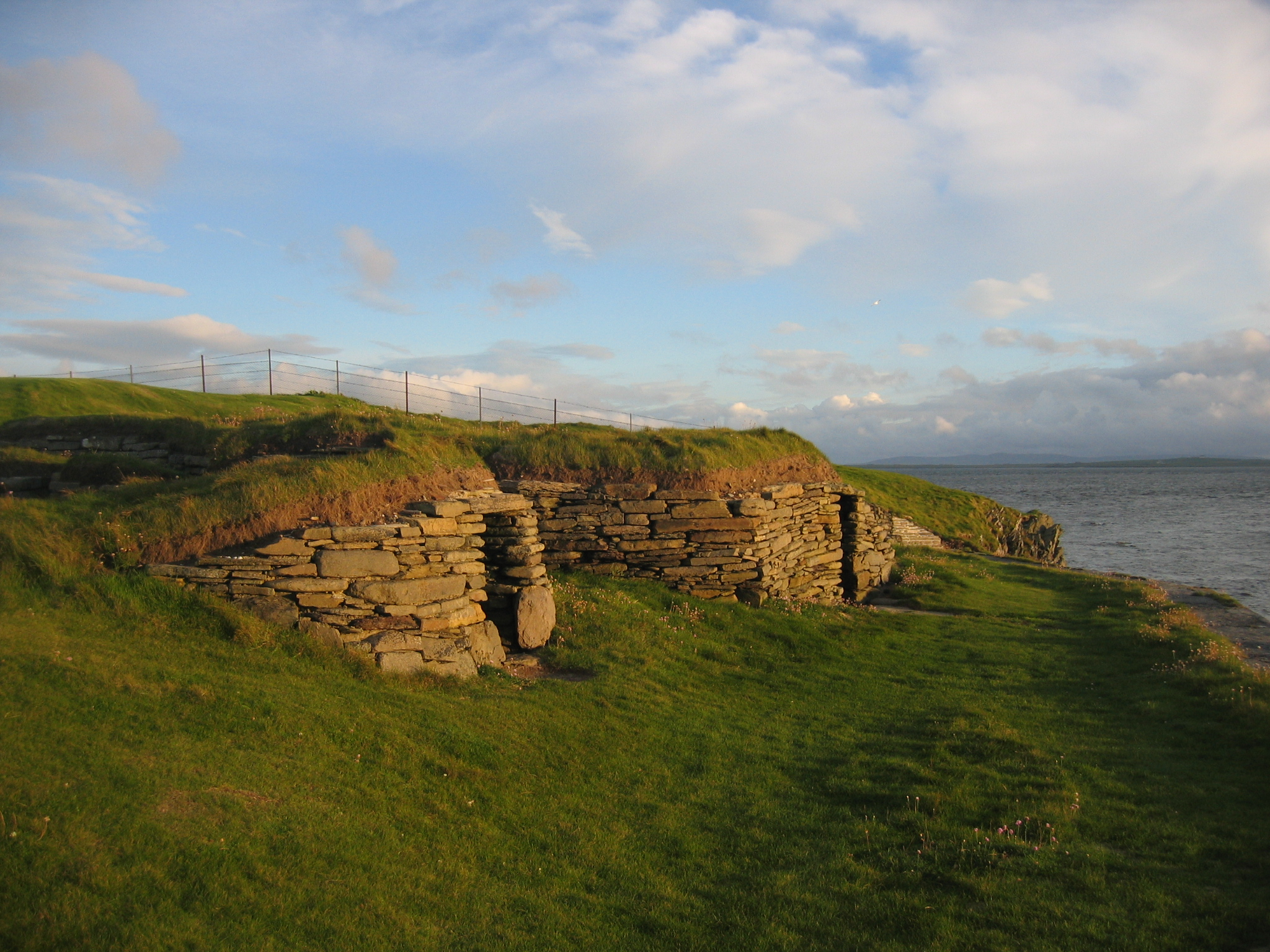
The houses at Knap of Howar, demonstrating the beginning of settled agriculture in Scotland

Scotland is roughly half the size of England and Wales, but has only between a fifth and a sixth of the amount of the arable or good pastoral land, which made marginal pastoral farming and, with its extensive coastline (roughly the same amount of coastline as all of the rest of Great Britain at 4,000 miles (6,400 km)), fishing, the key factors in the pre-modern economy. Only a fifth of Scotland's land is under 60 metres above sea level. Its east Atlantic position means that it has very heavy rainfall: today about 700 cm per year in the east and over 1,000 cm in the west. This encouraged the spread of blanket peat bog, the acidity of which, combined with high level of wind and salt spray, made most of the islands treeless. The existence of hills, mountains, quicksands and marshes made internal communication and conquest extremely difficult.

Mesolithic hunter-gatherer encampments are the first known settlements in the country, and archaeologists have dated an encampment near Biggar to around 8500 BC. Neolithic farming brought permanent settlements, and the wonderfully well preserved stone house at Knap of Howar on Papa Westray dating from 3500 BC predates by about 500 years the village of similar houses at Skara Brae on West Mainland, Orkney. From the commencement of the Bronze Age to about 2000 BC the archaeological record shows a decline in the number of large new stone buildings constructed. Pollen analyses suggest that at this time woodland increased at the expense of the area under cultivation. Bronze and Iron Age metalworking was slowly introduced to Scotland from Europe over a lengthy period. Scotland's population grew to perhaps 300,000 in the second millennium BC.

Following a series of military successes in the south, forces led by Gnaeus Julius Agricola entered Scotland in 79 and later sent a fleet of galleys around the coast as far as the Orkney Islands. The geographer Ptolemy's identified 19 "towns" from intelligence gathered during the Agricolan campaigns. No archaeological evidence of any truly urban places has been found from this time and the names may have indicated hill forts or temporary market and meeting places and most of the names are obscure. Archaeology and dendrochronology suggests that the occupation of southern Scotland started before the arrival of Agricola. Whatever the exact dating, for the next 300 years Rome had some presence along the southern border.

== Middle Ages ==
=== Early Middle Ages ===
476 AD – 1000 AD

The early Middle Ages was a period of climate deterioration, with a drop in temperature and an increase in rainfall, resulting in more land becoming unproductive. Lacking the urban centres created under the Romans in the rest of Britain, the economy of Scotland in the early Middle Ages was overwhelmingly agricultural. With a lack of significant transport links and wider markets, most farms had to produce a self-sufficient diet of meat, dairy products and cereals, supplemented by hunter-gathering. Limited archaeological evidence indicates that throughout Northern Britain farming was based around a single homestead or a small cluster of three or four homes, each probably containing a nuclear family, with relationships likely to be common among neighbouring houses and settlements, reflecting the partition of land through inheritance. Farming became based around a system that distinguished between the infield around the settlement, where crops were grown every year and the outfield, further away and where crops were grown and then left fallow in different years, in a system that would continue until the 18th century. The evidence of bones indicates that cattle were by far the most important domesticated animal, followed by pigs, sheep and goats, while domesticated fowl were very rare. Imported goods found in archaeological sites of the period include ceramics and glass, while many sites indicate iron and precious metal working.

=== High Middle Ages ===
[around AD 1000 to 1250]

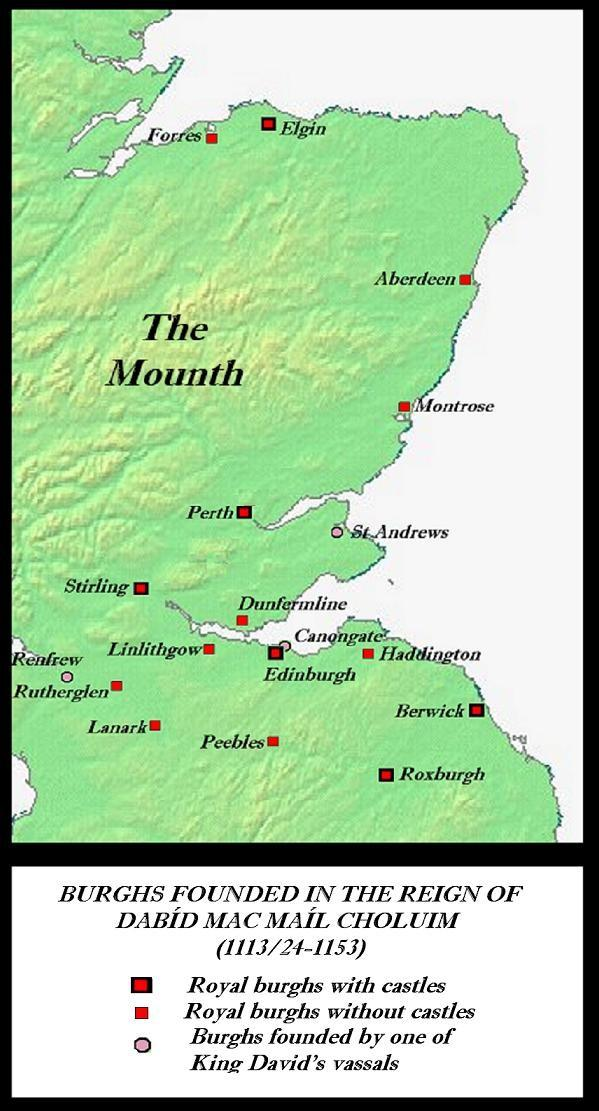
Burghs established in Scotland before the accession of Máel Coluim; these were essentially Scotland-proper's first towns.

Although the Scottish economy of this period was still dominated by agriculture and by short-distance, local trade, there was an increasing amount of foreign trade in the period, as well as exchange gained by means of military plunder. By the end of this period, coins were replacing barter goods, but for most of this period most exchange was done without the use of metal currency.

Most of Scotland's agricultural wealth in this period came from pastoralism, rather than arable farming. Arable farming grew significantly in the "Norman period", but with geographical differences, low-lying areas being subject to more arable farming than high-lying areas such as the Highlands, Galloway and the Southern Uplands. Galloway, in the words of G.W.S. Barrow, "already famous for its cattle, was so overwhelmingly pastoral, that there is little evidence in that region of land under any permanent cultivation, save along the Solway coast." The average amount of land used by a husbandman in Scotland might have been around 26 acres. There is a lot of evidence that the native Scots favoured pastoralism, in that Gaelic lords were happier to give away more land to French and Middle English-speaking settlers, whilst holding on tenaciously to more high-lying regions, perhaps contributing to the Highland/Galloway-Lowland division that emerged in Scotland in the later Middle Ages. The main unit of land measurement in Scotland was the davoch (i.e. "vat"), called the arachor in Lennox. This unit is also known as the "Scottish ploughgate." In English-speaking Lothian, it was simply ploughgate. It may have measured about 104 acres (0.42 km^{2}), divided into 4 raths. Cattle, pigs and cheeses were among the most produced foodstuffs, but of course a vast range of foodstuffs were produced, from sheep and fish, rye and barley, to bee wax and honey.

Pre-Davidian Scotland had no known chartered burghs, though most, if not all, of the burghs granted charters by the crown already existed long before the reign of David I. His charters gave them legal status, a new form of recognition. Scotland, outside Lothian, Lanarkshire, Roxburghshire, Berwickshire, Angus, Aberdeenshire and Fife at least, largely was populated by scattered hamlets, and outside that area, lacked the continental style nucleated village. David I established the first chartered burghs in Scotland, copying the burgher charters and Leges Burgorum (rules governing virtually every aspect of life and work in a burgh) almost verbatim from the English customs of Newcastle-Upon-Tyne. Early burgesses were usually Flemish, English, French and German, rather than Gaelic Scots. The burgh’s vocabulary was composed totally of either Germanic and French terms. The councils which ran individual burghs were individually known as lie doussane, meaning the dozen.

=== Late Middle Ages ===
[around 1300 - 1500]

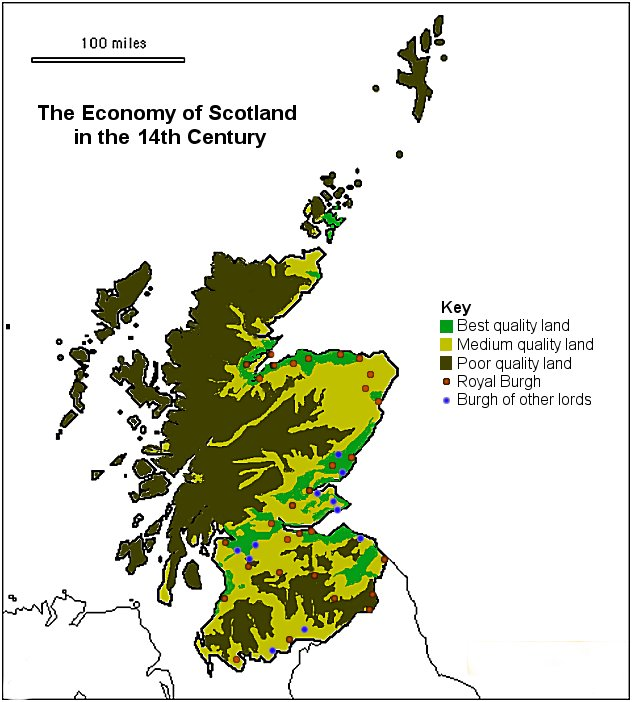
The economy of Scotland in the 14th century

In this period, with difficult terrain, poor roads and methods of transport there was little trade between different areas of the country and most settlements depended on what was produced locally, often with very little in reserve in bad years. Most farming was based on the lowland fermtoun or highland baile, settlements of a handful of families that jointly farmed an area notionally suitable for two or three plough teams, allocated in run rigs to tenant farmers. They usually ran downhill so that they included both wet and dry land, helping to offset some of the problems of extreme weather conditions. Most ploughing was done with a heavy wooden plough with an iron coulter, pulled by oxen, which were more effective and cheaper to feed than horses. Obligations to the local lord usually included supplying oxen for ploughing the lord's land on an annual basis and the much resented obligation to grind corn at the lord's mill. The rural economy appears to have boomed in the 13th century and in the immediate aftermath of the Black Death was still buoyant, but by the 1360s there was a severe falling off incomes that can be seen in clerical benefices, of between a third and half compared with the beginning of the era, to be followed by a slow recovery in the 15th century.

Most of the burghs were on the east coast, and among them were the largest and wealthiest, including Aberdeen, Perth and Edinburgh, whose growth was facilitated by trade with the continent. Although in the south-west Glasgow was beginning to develop and Ayr and Kirkcudbright had occasional links with Spain and France, sea trade with Ireland was much less profitable. In addition to the major royal burghs this era saw the proliferation of less baronial and ecclesiastical burghs, with 51 being created between 1450 and 1516. Most of these were much smaller than their royal counterparts, excluded from international trade they mainly acted as local markets and centres of craftsmanship. In general burghs probably carried out far more local trading with their hinterlands, relying on them for food, raw materials. The wool trade was a major export at the beginning of the period, but the introduction of sheep-scab was a serious blow to the trade and it began to decline as an export from the early 15th century and despite a levelling off, there was another drop in exports as the markets collapsed in the early-16th century Low Countries. Unlike in England, this did not prompt the Scots to turn to large-scale cloth production and only poor quality rough cloths seem to have been significant.

There were relatively few developed crafts in Scotland in this period, although by the later 15th century there were the beginnings of a native iron casting industry, which led to the production of cannon and of the silver and goldsmithing for which the country would later be known. As a result, the most important exports were unprocessed raw materials, including wool, hides, salt, fish, animals and coal, while Scotland remained frequently short of wood, iron and in years of bad harvests grain. Exports of hides and particularly salmon, where the Scots held a decisive advantage in quality over their rivals, appear to have held up much better than wool, despite the general economic downturn in Europe in the aftermath of the plague. The growing desire among the court, lords, upper clergy and wealthier merchants for luxury goods that largely had to be imported led to a chronic shortage of bullion. This, and perennial problems in royal finance, led to several debasements of the coinage, with the amount of silver in a penny being cut to almost a fifth between the late 14th century and the late 15th century. The heavily debased "black money" introduced in 1480 had to be withdrawn two years later and may have helped fuel a financial and political crisis.

== Early modern era ==
=== Sixteenth century ===
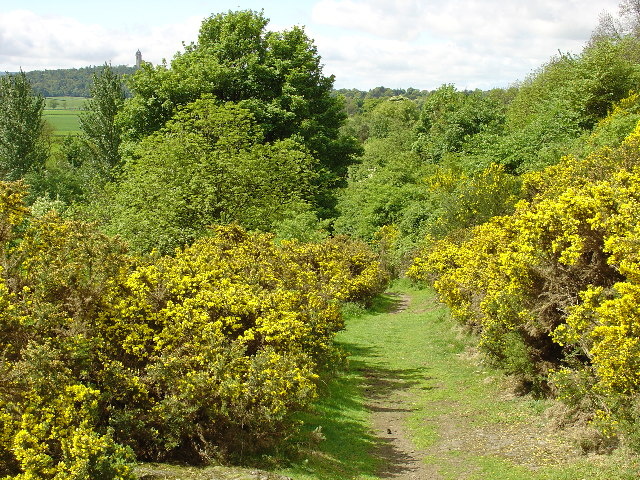
A section of drover's road at Cotkerse near Blairlogie, Scotland

From the mid-sixteenth century, Scotland experienced a decline in demand for exports of cloth and wool to the continent. Scots responded by selling larger quantities of traditional goods, increasing the output of salt, herring and coal. The late sixteenth century was an era of economic distress, probably exacerbated by increasing taxation and the devaluation of the currency. In 1582 a pound of silver produced 640 shillings, but in 1601 it was 960 and the exchange rate with England was £6 Scots to £1 sterling in 1565, but by 1601 it had fallen to £12. Wages rose rapidly, by between four or five times between 1560 and the end of the century, but failed to keep pace with inflation. This situation was punctuated by frequent harvest failures, with almost half the years in the second half of the sixteenth century seeing local or national scarcity, necessitating the shipping of large quantities of grain from the Baltic. Distress was also exacerbated by outbreaks of plague, with major epidemics in the periods 1584-8 and 1597-1609. There were the beginnings of industrial manufacture in this period, often utilising expertise from the continent, which included a failed attempt to use Flemings to teach new techniques in the developing cloth industry in the north-east, but more successful in bringing a Venetian to help develop a native glass blowing industry. George Bruce used German techniques to solve the drainage problems of his coal mine at Culross. In 1596 the Society of Brewer's was established in Edinburgh and the importing of English hops allowed the brewing of Scottish beer.

=== Seventeenth century ===
In the early seventeenth century famine was relatively common, with four periods of famine prices between 1620 and 1625. The invasions of the 1640s had a profound impact on the Scottish economy, with the destruction of crops and the disruption of markets resulting in some of the most rapid price rises of the century. Under the Commonwealth, the country was relatively highly taxed, but gained access to English markets. After the Restoration the formal frontier with England was re-established, along with its customs duties. Economic conditions were generally favourable from 1660 to 1688, as land owners promoted better tillage and cattle-raising. The monopoly of royal burghs over foreign trade was partially ended by and Act of 1672, leaving them with the old luxuries of wines, silk, spices and dyes and opening up trade of increasingly significant salt, coal, corn and hides and imports from the Americas. The English Navigation Acts limited the ability of the Scots to engage in what would have been lucrative trading with England's growing colonies, but these were often circumvented, with Glasgow becoming an increasingly important commercial centre, opening up trade with the American colonies: importing sugar from the West Indies and tobacco from Virginia and Maryland. Exports across the Atlantic included linen, woollen goods, coal and grindstones. The English protective tariffs on salt and cattle were harder to disregard and probably placed greater limitations on the Scottish economy, despite attempts of the King to have it overturned. However, by the end of the century the drovers roads, stretching down from the Highlands through south-west Scotland to north-east England, had become firmly established. Scottish attempts to counter this with tariffs of their own, were largely unsuccessful as Scotland had relatively few vital exports to protect. Attempts by the Privy Council to build up luxury industries in cloth mills, soap works, sugar boiling houses, gunpowder and paper works, proved largely unsuccessful.

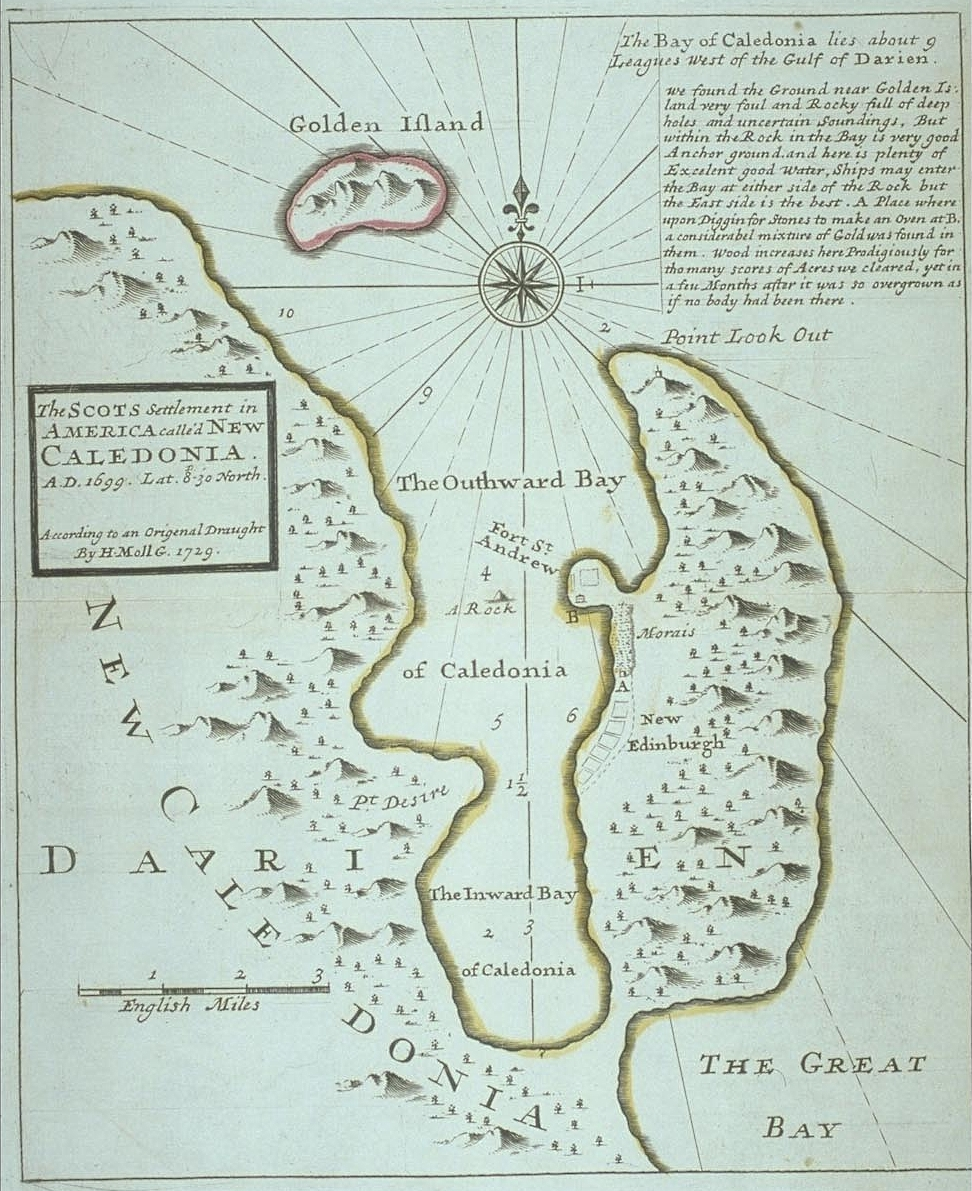
The colony of New Caledonia on the Isthmus of Darien

The closing decade of the seventeenth century saw the generally favourable economic conditions that had dominated since the Restoration come to an end. There was a slump in trade with the Baltic and France from 1689 to 1691, caused by French protectionism and changes in the Scottish cattle trade, followed by four years of failed harvests (1695, 1696 and 1698-9), known as the "seven ill years". The result was severe famine and depopulation, particularly in the north. The famines of the 1690s were seem as particularly severe partly because famine had become relatively rare in the second half of the seventeenth century, with only one year of dearth (in 1674) and the shortages of the 1690s would be the last of their kind.

The Parliament of Scotland of 1695 enacted proposals that might help the desperate economic situation, including setting up the Bank of Scotland. Recently founded sugar houses were encouraged in Glasgow and Leith. The "Company of Scotland Trading to Africa and the Indies" received a charter to raise capital through public subscription. The "Company of Scotland" invested in the Darien scheme, an ambitious plan devised by William Paterson, the Scottish founder of the Bank of England, to build a colony on the Isthmus of Panama in the hope of establishing trade with the Far East. Since the capital resources of the Edinburgh merchants and landholder elite were insufficient, the company appealed to middling social ranks, who responded with patriotic fervour to the call for money; the lower orders volunteered as colonists. The project proved a disaster, with only one ship and 1,000 colonists returning home. The cost of £150,000 put a severe strain on the Scottish commercial system.

=== 18th century ===
By the start of the 18th century, a political union between Scotland and England became politically and economically attractive, promising to open up the much larger markets of England, as well as those of the growing British Empire. The Scottish parliament voted on 6 January 1707, by 110 to 69 to adopt the Treaty of Union. It was a full economic union; indeed, most of its 25 articles dealt with economic arrangements for the new state known as "Great Britain." It added 45 Scots to the 513 members of the House of Commons and 16 Scots to the 190 members of the House of Lords, and ended the Scottish parliament. It also replaced the Scottish systems of currency, taxation and laws regulating trade with laws made in London. England had about five times the population of Scotland at the time, and about 36 times as much wealth.

=== Agriculture ===
Contacts with England led to a conscious attempt to improve agriculture among the gentry and nobility. Turnips and cabbages were introduced, lands enclosed and marshes drained, lime was put down, roads built and woods planted. Drilling and sowing and crop rotation were introduced. The introduction of the potato to Scotland in 1739 greatly improved the diet of the peasantry. Enclosures began to displace the runrig system and free pasture. The Society of Improvers was founded in 1723, including in its 300 members dukes, earls, lairds and landlords.

Scottish proprietors had greater legal powers to direct agrarian improvements than their English counterparts. For example, they could evict tenants at the end of leases, allowing greater freedom to consolidate land and determine the composition of their tenantry. Further, landowners were able to insert improvement clauses into lease contracts and ensure tenants complied through the Sherriff Courts.

The Lothians became a major centre of grain, Ayrshire of cattle breeding and the borders of sheep. However, although some estate holders improved the quality of life of their displaced workers, enclosures led to unemployment and forced migrations to the burghs or abroad.

=== Exports ===
The economic benefits of union were very slow to appear, primarily because Scotland was too poor to exploit the opportunities of the greatly expanded free market. Some progress was visible by 1750, such as the sales of linen and cattle to England, the cash flows from military service, and the tobacco trade that was dominated by Glasgow after 1740. However, Glasgow immediately re-exported nearly all the tobacco, so it did not stimulate local business, and that port exported few Scottish products. The tobacco trade collapsed during the American Revolution, when it sources were cut off by the British blockade of American ports. An important new trade to develop with the West Indies that made up for the loss of the tobacco business. The Scottish Enlightenment was indeed a remarkable intellectual event, but it had few direct benefits for the economy at large. Scotland in 1700 was a poor rural, agricultural society with a population of 1.3 million. Its transformation into a rich leader of modern industry came suddenly and unexpectedly.

=== Glasgow ===
In Glasgow, merchants who profited from the American trade in the 1730-1790 era began investing in leather, textiles, iron, coal, sugar, rope, sailcloth, glassworks, breweries, and soapworks, setting the foundations for the city's emergence as a leading industrial centre after 1815. Initially relying on hired ships, by 1736 it had 67 of its own, a third of which were trading with the New World. Glasgow emerged as the focus of the tobacco trade, re-exporting particularly to France. The merchants dealing in this lucrative business became the wealthy tobacco lords, who dominated the city for most of the century.

By 1790 the expanded and prosperous trade with the West Indies reflected the extensive growth of the cotton industry, the British sweet tooth, and the demand in the West Indies for herring and linen goods. During 1750-1815, 78 Glasgow merchants not only specialized in the importation of sugar, cotton, and rum from the West Indies, but diversified their interests by purchasing West Indian plantations, Scottish estates, or cotton mills. They were not to be self-perpetuating due to the hazards of the trade, the incident of bankruptcy, and the changing complexity of Glasgow's economy.

Other burghs also benefited. Greenock enlarged its port in 1710 and sent its first ship to the Americas in 1719, but was soon playing a major part in importing sugar and rum.

=== Linen ===
The linen industry was Scotland's premier industry in the 18th century and formed the basis for the later cotton, jute, and woollen industries as well. The Scottish members of parliament managed to see off an attempt to impose an export duty on linen and from 1727 it received subsidies of £2,750 a year for six years, resulting in a considerable expansion of the trade. Paisley adopted Dutch methods and became a major centre of production. Glasgow manufactured for the export trade, which doubled between 1725 and 1738.

Scottish industrial policy was made by the Board of Trustees for Fisheries and Manufactures in Scotland, which sought to build an economy complementary, not competitive, with England. Since England had woollens, this meant linen. Encouraged and subsidized by the Board of Trustees so it could compete with German products, merchant entrepreneurs became dominant in all stages of linen manufacturing and built up the market share of Scottish linens, especially in the American colonial market.

== 19th century ==
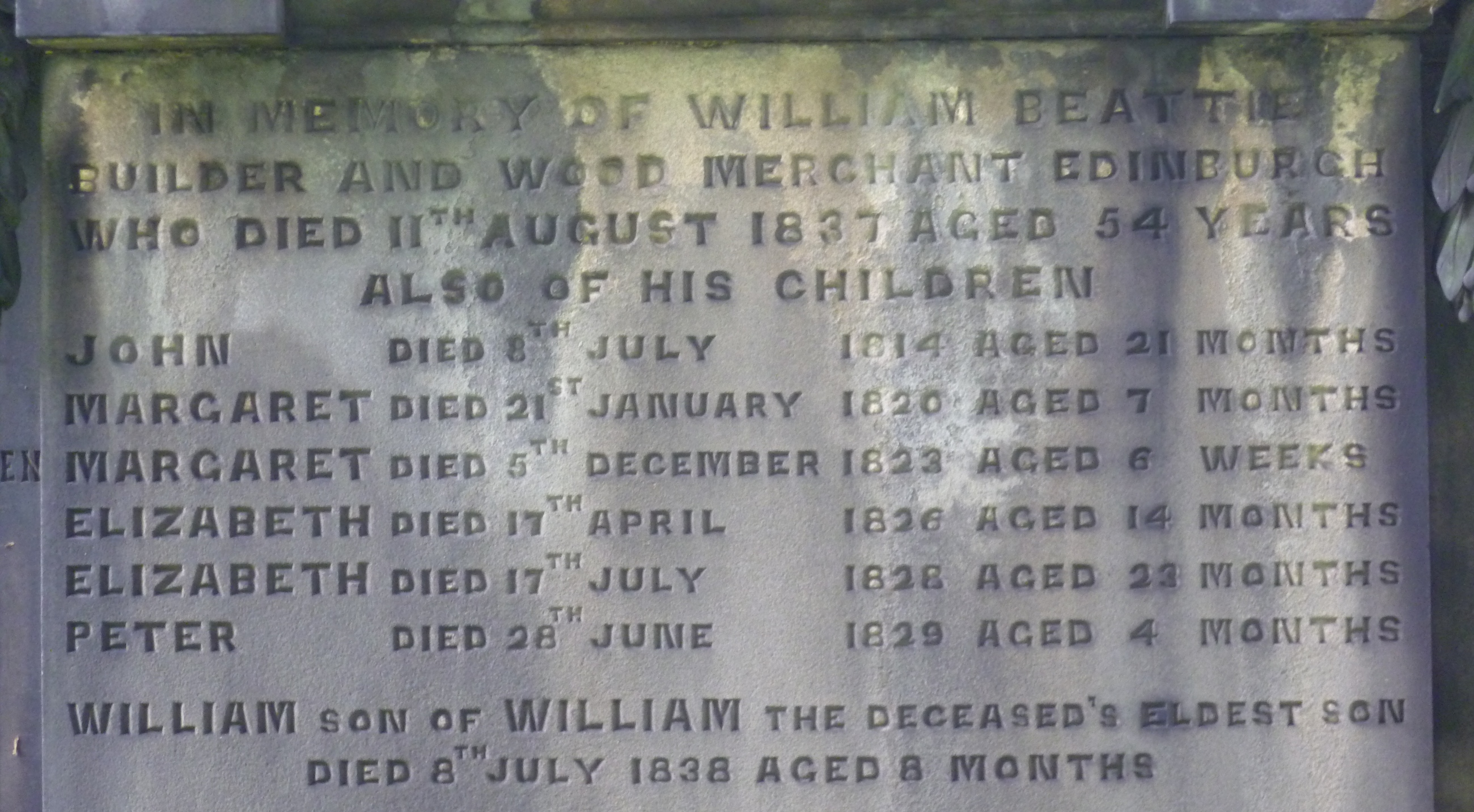
Evidence of high infant mortality on an Edinburgh gravestone

Scotland's population grew steadily in the 19th century, from 1,608,000 in the census of 1801 to 2,889,000 in 1851 and 4,472,000 in 1901. The economy, traditionally based on agriculture, began to industrialize after 1790. At first the leading industry, based in the west, was the spinning and weaving of cotton. In 1861 the American Civil War suddenly cut off the supplies of raw cotton and caused serious social distress before peace was imposed with the defeat of the Confederacy and the restoration of the Union. Textile production recovered thereafter, concentrated especially in Paisley, Renfrewshire, and by the end of the century J. & P. Coats, arguably the first multinational industrial corporation in the world, was globally synonymous with cotton thread, and the largest industrial company in the United Kingdom. Thanks to its many entrepreneurs and engineers, and its large stock of easily mined coal, Scotland became a world centre for engineering, shipbuilding, and locomotive construction, with steel replacing iron after 1870.

Liberalism emerged from urban Scotland, the free-trade sentiments and strong individualism of entrepreneurs merging with the radical emphasis on education and self-reliance as a means of community betterment. Despite political challenges, especially by the 1900s, these distinctive liberal values remained strong.

=== Banking ===
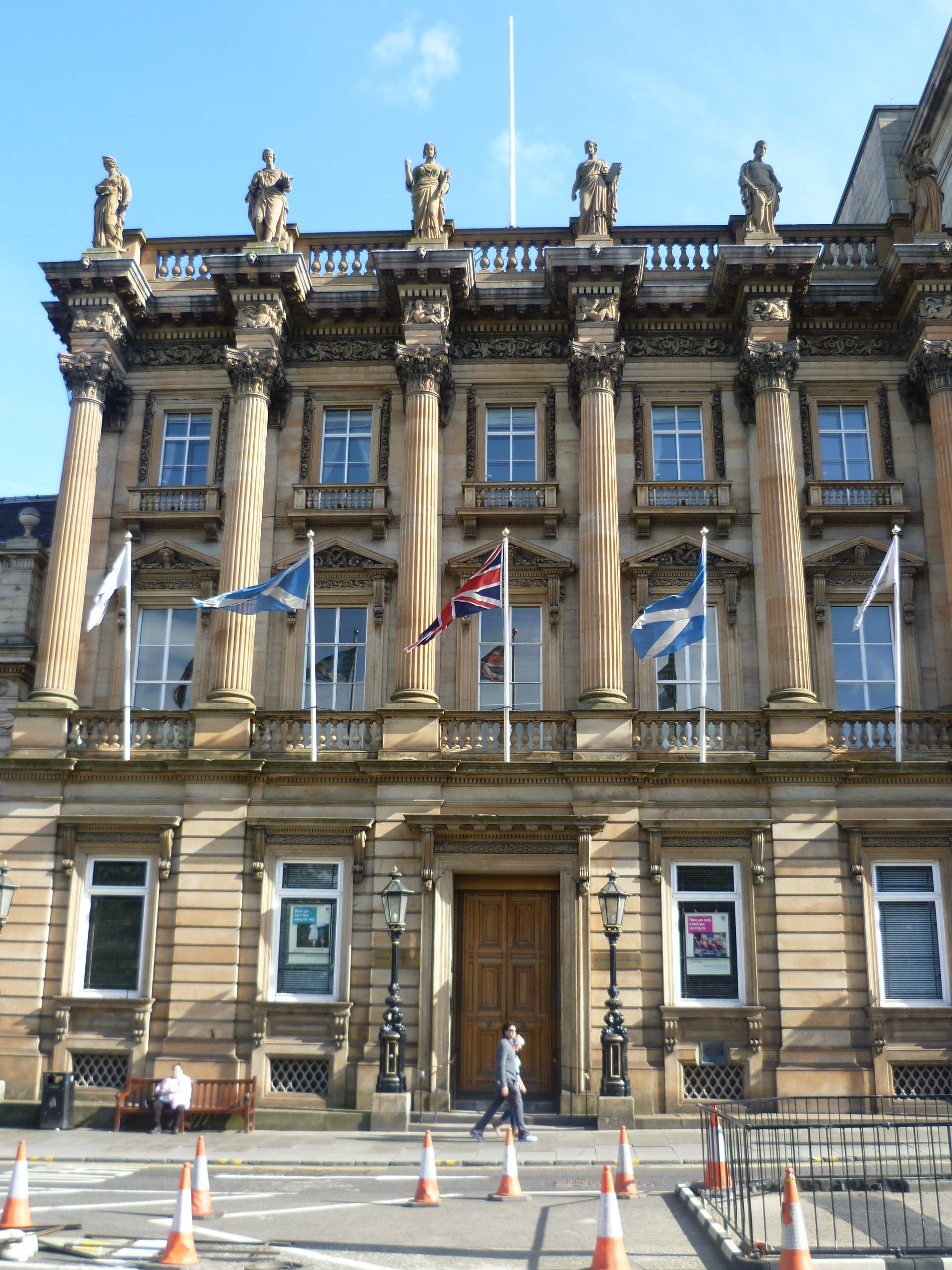
The former Head Office of the British Linen Bank in St. Andrew Square, Edinburgh. Now offices of the Bank of Scotland.

The first Scottish banks, Bank of Scotland (Edinburgh, 1695) the Royal Bank of Scotland (Edinburgh, 1727) are still in operation. By the early 19th century Glasgow had strong banks as well and Scotland had a flourishing financial system. There were over 400 branches, amounting to one office per 7000 people, double the level in England. The banks were more lightly regulated than those in England. Historians often emphasize that the flexibility and dynamism of the Scottish banking system contributed significantly to the rapid development of the economy in the 19th century.

The British Linen Company, established in 1746, was the largest firm in the Scottish linen industry in the 18th century, exporting linen to England and America. As a joint-stock company, it had the right to raise funds through the issue of promissory notes or bonds. With its bonds functioning as bank notes, the company gradually moved into the business of lending and discounting to other linen manufacturers, and in the early 1770s banking became its main activity. Renamed British Linen Bank in 1906, it was one of Scotland's premier banks until it was bought out by the Bank of Scotland in 1969.

=== Emigration ===
Even with the growth of industry there never were enough good jobs, so during the 1841-1931 era, about 2 million Scots emigrated to North America, Australia and New Zealand, and another 750,000 relocated to England. By the 21st century, there were about as many people of Scottish descent in both Canada (see Scotch Canadians) and the U.S. (see Scottish American) as the 5 million remaining in Scotland, within America alone some professional estimates place the number of Americans with Scottish ancestry as high as 25 million.

=== Industrial Revolution ===
During the Industrial Revolution, Scotland became one of the commercial, intellectual and industrial powerhouses of the British Empire. Beginning about 1790 the most important industry in the west of Scotland became textiles, especially the spinning and weaving of cotton, which flourished until the American Civil War in 1861 cut off the supplies of raw cotton. However, by that time Scotland had developed heavy industries based on its coal and iron resources. The invention of the hot blast for smelting iron (1828) had revolutionized the Scottish iron industry, and Scotland became a centre for engineering, shipbuilding, and locomotive construction. Toward the end of the 19th century steel production largely replaced iron production. Emigrant Andrew Carnegie built the American steel industry, and spent much of his time and philanthropy in Scotland.

=== Cities ===
As the 19th century wore on, Lowland Scotland turned more and more towards heavy industry. Glasgow and the River Clyde became a major shipbuilding centre. Glasgow became one of the largest cities in the world, and known as "the Second City of the Empire" after London.

The industrial developments, while they brought work and wealth, were so rapid that housing, town-planning, and provision for public health did not keep pace with them, and for a time living conditions in some of the towns and cities were notoriously bad, with overcrowding, high infant mortality, and growing rates of tuberculosis.

==== Dundee ====
Dundee upgraded its harbour and established itself as an industrial and trading centre. Dundee's industrial heritage was based on "the three Js": jute, jam and journalism. East-central Scotland became too heavily dependent on linens, hemp, and jute. Despite the cyclical nature of the trade which periodically ruined weaker companies, profits held up well in the 19th century. Typical firms were family affairs, even after the introduction of limited liability in the 1890s. The profits helped make the city an important source of overseas investment, especially in North America. However, the profits were seldom invested locally, apart from the linen trade. The reasons were that low wages limited local consumption, and because there were no important natural resources; thus the Dundee region offered little opportunity for profitable industrial diversification.

=== Coal ===
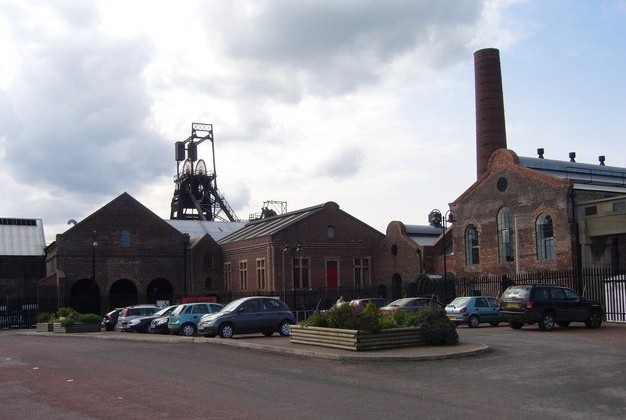
National Mining Museum of Scotland at Newtongrange, Midlothian, showing a move from heavy industry to tourism about heavy industry

Coal mining became a major industry, and coal production expanded into the 20th century producing the fuel to heat homes and factories and drive steam engines, locomotives and steamships and the raw materials required by the chemical industry. In 1841 26,147 workers were employed in Scottish mines and quarries; by 1911 there were 155,691. The early stereotype of Scottish colliers as brutish, non-religious and socially isolated serfs; was an exaggeration, for their life style resembled coal miners everywhere, with a strong emphasis on masculinity, egalitarianism, group solidarity, and support for radical labour movements.

=== Railways ===
Britain was the world leader in the construction of railways, and their use to expand trade and coal supplies. The first line opened in 1831. Not only was good passenger service established by the late 1840s, but an excellent network of freight lines reduce the cost of shipping coal, and made products manufactured in Scotland competitive throughout Britain. For example, railways open the London market to Scottish beef and milk. They enabled the Aberdeen Angus to become a cattle breed of worldwide reputation.

=== Shipbuilding ===
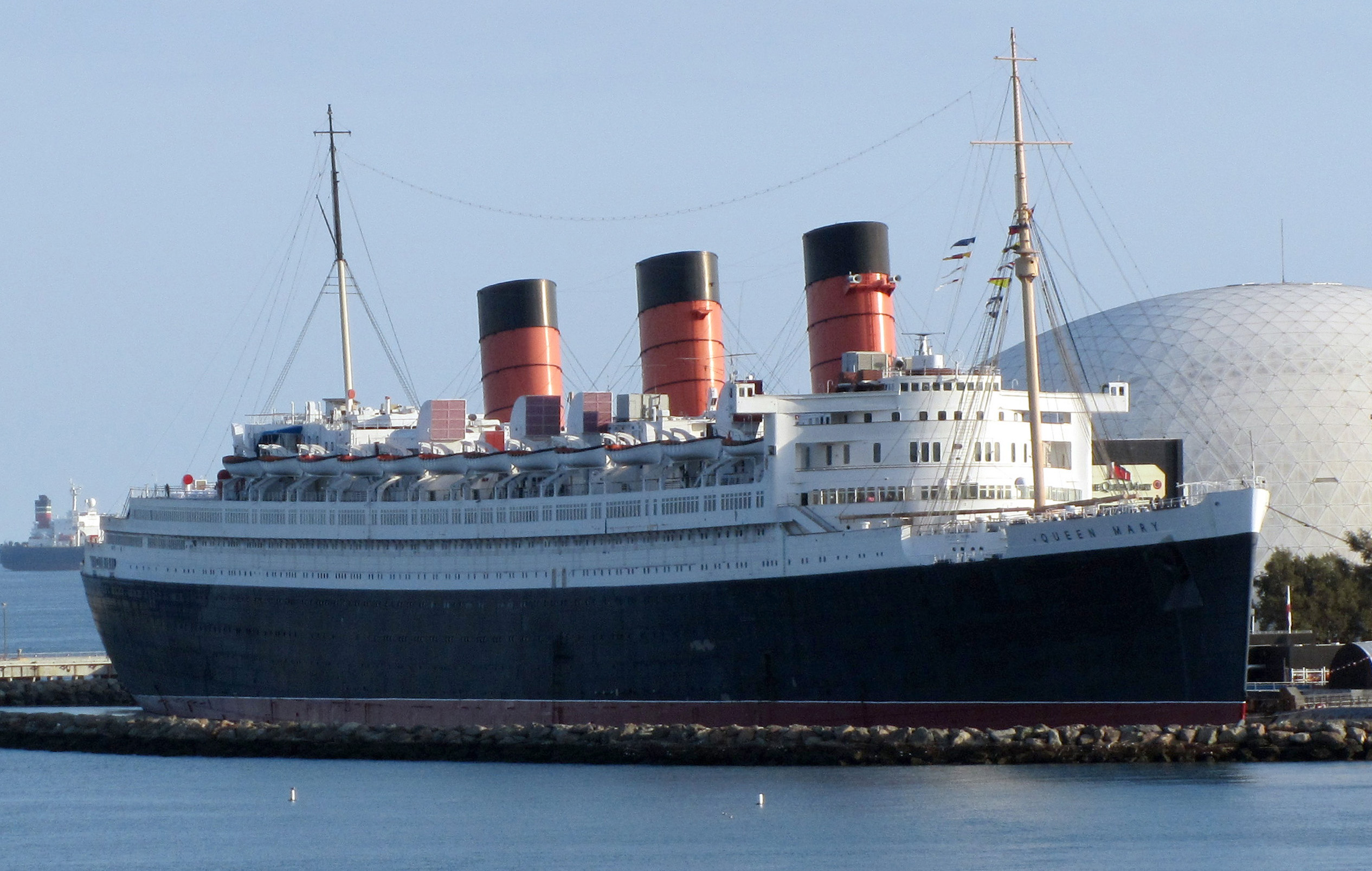
RMS Queen Mary was built in Glasgow at the John Brown & Company shipyard.

Shipbuilding on Clydeside (the river Clyde through Glasgow and other points) reached its peak in the years in the 1900-1918 era, with an output of 370 ships completed in 1913, and even more during the First World War. The total output from some 300 firms (that is, 30-40 at any one time) exceeded 25,000 ships.

The first small yards were opened in 1712 at the Scott family's shipyard at Greenock. After 1860 the Clydeside shipyards specialized in steamships made of iron (after 1870, made of steel), which rapidly replaced the wooden sailing vessels of both the merchant fleets and the battle fleets of the world. It became the world's pre-eminent shipbuilding centre. Clydebuilt became an industry benchmark of quality, and the river's shipyards were given contracts for warships, as well as prestigious liners such as the Queen Mary.

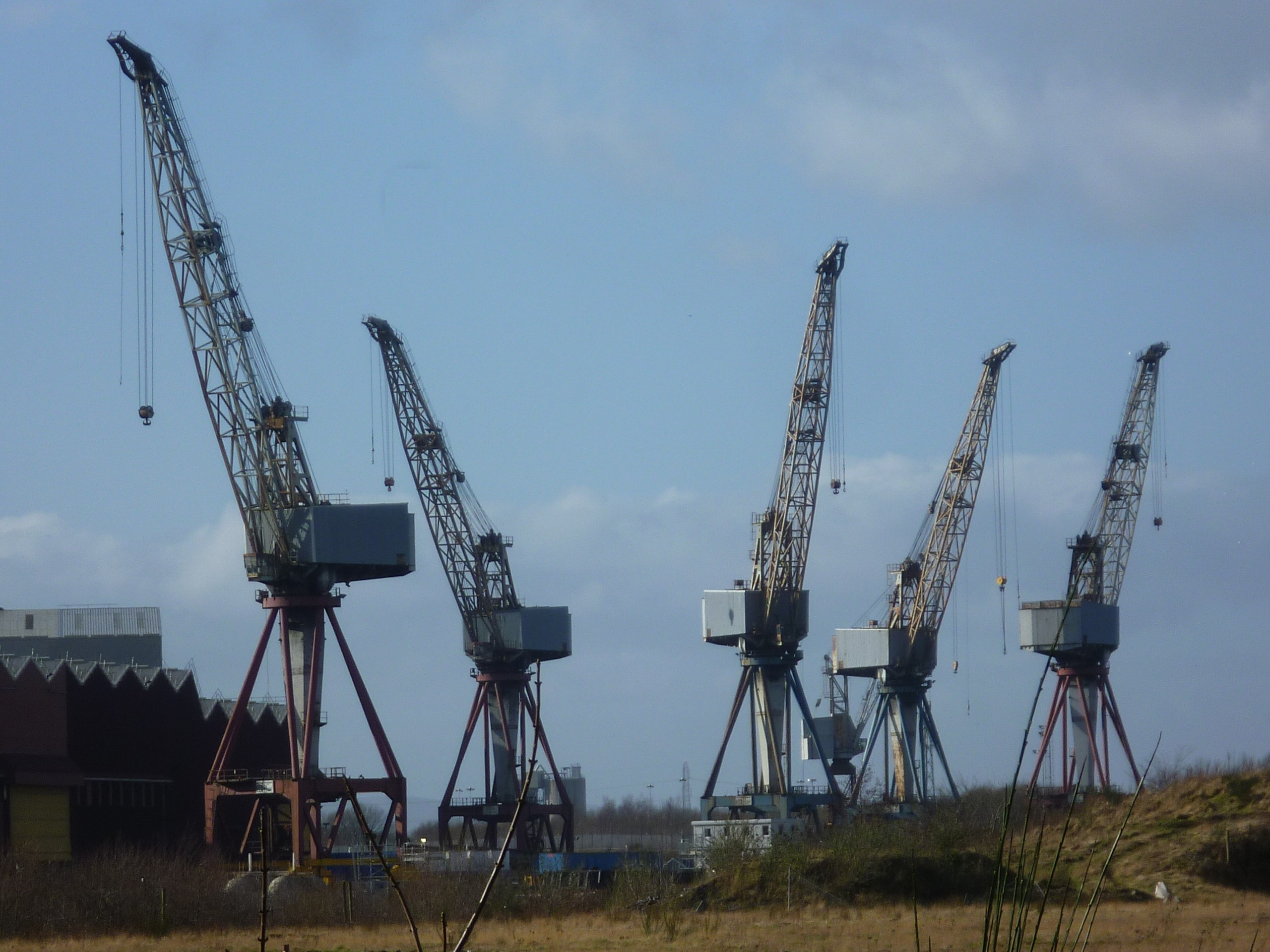
Surviving cranes at the former Fairfield shipyard in Govan

Major firms included Denny of Dumbarton, Scotts Shipbuilding & Engineering Company and Robert Steele & Company of Greenock, Lithgows of Port Glasgow, Simon and Lobnitz of Renfrew, Alexander Stephen & Sons of Linthouse, Fairfield of Govan, Inglis of Pointhouse, Barclay Curle of Whiteinch, Connell and Yarrow of Scotstoun. Equally important were the engineering firms that supplied the machinery to drive these vessels, the boilers and pumps and steering gear - Rankin & Blackmore, Hastie's and Kincaid's of Greenock, Rowan's of Finnieston, Weir's of Cathcart, Howden's of Tradeston and Babcock & Wilcox of Renfrew. The biggest customer was Sir William Mackinnon, who ran five shipping companies in the 19th century from his base in Glasgow.

A representative entrepreneur in Glasgow was William Lithgow (1854–1908), who at the age of 16 inherited £1,000 and at his death left a fortune of £1.75 million. Starting with partners whom he later bought out, he employed innovative designs and concepts such as interchangeable components, helped finance his customers by purchasing shares in their ships, and continuously expanded his shipyard. When rivals went bankrupt during the depression years of the 1880s and 1890s, Lithgows survived. His children and grandchildren built the company into the world's largest private shipbuilding firm by 1950, but the family sold the yards to the government in 1977 and diversified their holdings into other industries.

The companies attracted rural workers, as well as immigrants from Catholic Ireland, by inexpensive company housing that was a dramatic move upward from the inner-city slums. This paternalistic policy led many owners to endorse government sponsored housing programs as well as self-help projects among the respectable working class.

=== Rural life ===
A handful of powerful families, typified by the dukes of Argyll, Atholl, Buccleuch, and Sutherland, owned an enormous quantity of land and, until 1885, had great influence on political affairs. The concentration of land ownership is illustrated by, in 1878, 68 persons owning nearly half of Scotland and 580 people owning over three quarters.

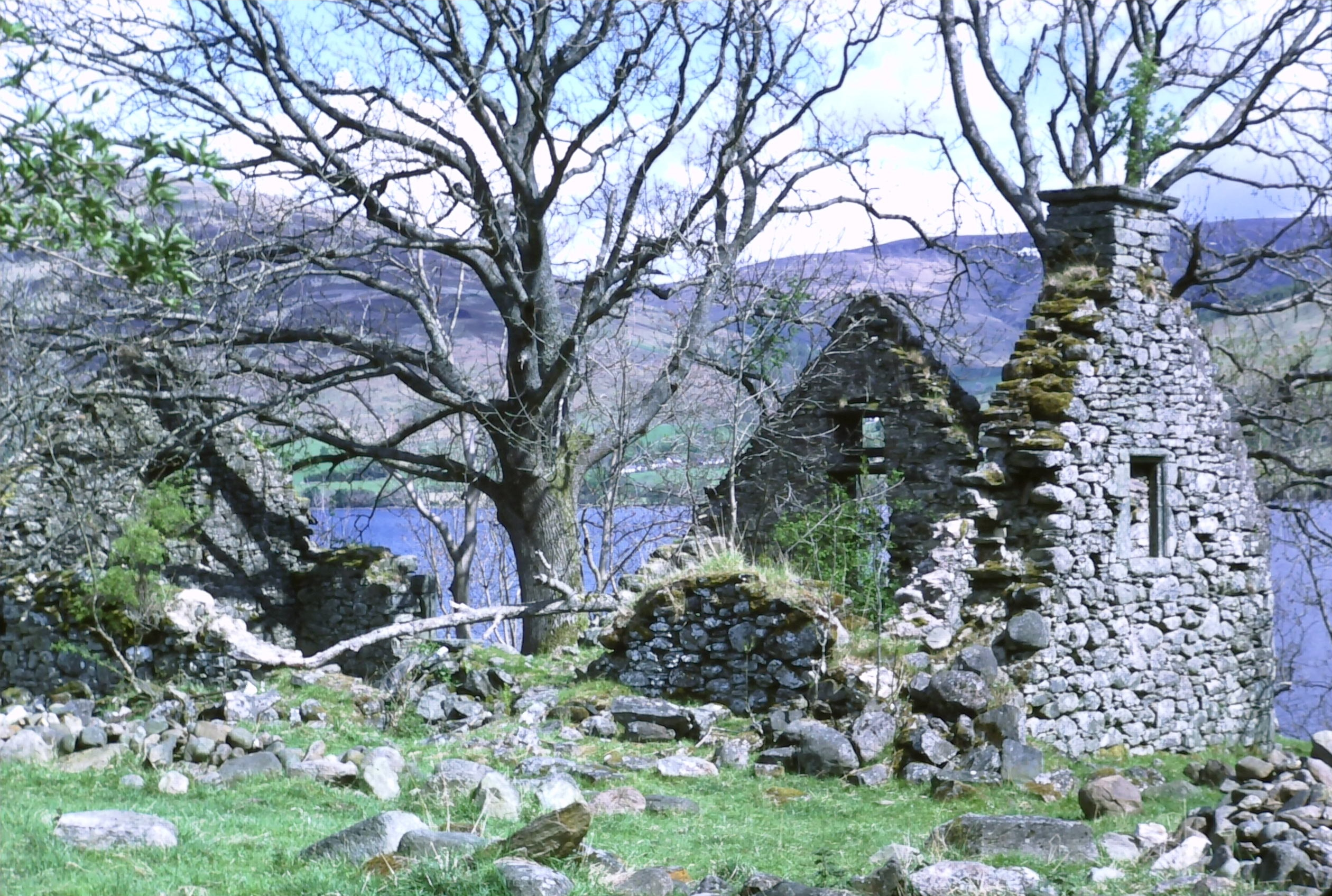
One of a cluster of deserted and ruinous cottages on the north side of Loch Tay, Perthshire. The area was affected by the so-called "Breadalbane Clearances" of the 1840s.

Agriculture in the Lowlands was steadily upgraded after 1700, and standards remained high. However, after the repeal of the Corn Laws in 1846, when Britain adopted a free trade policy, grain imports from America undermined the profitability of crop production. The result was a continuous exodus from the land—to the cities, or further afield to England, Canada, America or Australia.

The traditional landed interests held their own politically in the face of the rapidly growing urban middle classes, for the electoral reforms of mid-century were less far-reaching in Scotland than in England. The landed interests managed to ensure that the political weight of numbers was skewed disproportionately in their favour.

The Highlands meanwhile were very poor and traditional, with few connections to the uplift of the Scottish Enlightenment and little role in the Industrial Revolution. The 100 or so wealthiest landlords needed cash to maintain their position in London society, and had less need of soldiers now that warfare had abated. Therefore, they turned to money rents, displaced farmers to raise sheep, and downplayed the traditional patriarchal relationship that had historically sustained the clans. A new group appeared, the crofters, emerging for the first time in the late 18th and early 19th centuries. They were poor families living on "crofts" or very small rented farms used to raise potatoes, with kelping, fishing, and spinning of linen, and military service, as important sources of revenue.

The era of the Napoleonic wars, 1790–1815, brought prosperity, optimism, and economic growth to the Highlands. The economy grew thanks to wages paid by kelping industry (where men burned kelp for the ashes), fisheries, and weaving, as well as large-scale infrastructure spending such as the Caledonian Canal project. On the East Coast, farmlands were improved, and high prices for cattle brought money to the community. Service in the Army was also attractive to young men from Highlands, who sent pay home and retired there with their army pensions. The prosperity ended after 1815, and long-run negative factors began to undermine the economic position of the poor tenant farmers or "crofters," as they were called. The adoption by the landowners of a market orientation in the century after 1750 dissolved the traditional social and economic structure of the north-west Highlands and Hebrides Islands, causing great disruption for the crofters. The Highland Clearances and the end of the township system followed changes in land ownership and tenancy and the replacement of cattle by sheep.

== 20th century ==
=== Population ===
The population of Scotland expanded at a modest rate in the early 20th century, growing from 4,760,904 reported in the census of 1911 to 5,096,415 in 1951; thereafter it stabilised at just a little over 5 million people; the Census of 2001 enumerated a population of 5,064,200 The employment structure in Scotland, as in the rest of the United Kingdom, reflected the growth of the services sector at the relative expense of manufacturing.

=== Trade unions ===
Scottish workers played a major role in the nationwide industrial upheavals of 1910-14. The National Sailors' and Firemen's Union Directed strike activities in many port cities across Britain, while activists in the Glasgow Trades Council took the lead locally. The strongly local character of the strike movement and its leadership in Glasgow shaped both the strikes themselves - which were more unified and coherent in Glasgow than in some other centres - and the subsequent development of waterfront organisation on the Clyde, marked as it was by the emergence of independent locally based unions among both dockers and seamen.

=== Ships ===
Clydeside shipyards before the 1914 had been the busiest in the world, turning out more than one-third of the entire British output. They expanded dramatically during the war, primarily to produce transports of the sort that German submarines were busy sinking. Confident of postwar expansion, the companies borrowed heavily to expand their facilities. But after the war, employment tumbled as the yards proved too big, too expensive, and too inefficient; in any case world demand was down. The most skilled craftsmen were especially hard hit, because there were few alternative uses for their specialised skills. A serious weakness on the engineering side was a lag in developing the new technology of turbine engines, diesel engines, and welding techniques. The yards went into a long period of decline, interrupted only by the Second World War's temporary expansion. In the 21st century, only a handful of shipyards remain active.

=== Fish ===
The years before the First World War were the golden age of the inshore fisheries. The main port was Aberdeen. Landings reached new heights, and Scottish catches dominated Europe's herring trade, accounting for one-third of the British catch. The boats employed 34,000 men in 1911, with another 50,000 women on shore employed part-time in processing. High productivity came about thanks to the transition to more productive steam-powered boats, while the rest of Europe's fishing fleets were slower because they were still powered by sails. Scotland's fishermen had acquired nearly one thousand steam drifters by 1914, valued over two million pounds. However, the escalating level of capital expenditure necessitated new sources of capital; it came principally from merchants and fish salesmen. The fishermen now had to share their profits, and became entangled in informal contracts, tie-in sales and fast-accumulating debts. The shared cultural background facilitated mutual trust. The option of state intervention and government money was debated and rejected. By 2001 Peterhead was by far the largest fish-landing port in Europe; taken together with neighbouring Fraserburgh, a third of the fish landed in UK was landed in the North East of Scotland. Nevertheless, in common with other UK fishing ports, landed catch in Peterhead fell by nearly 20% after the UK left the European Union.

=== Deindustrialisation ===
Deindustrialisation took place rapidly in the 1970s and 1980s, as most of the traditional industries drastically shrank or were completely closed down. A new service-oriented economy emerged to replace traditional heavy industries.

=== Oil ===
Since the Second World War, the economy has been fully integrated into the overall British economy, with the most distinctive feature being the discovery of oil offshore in the North Sea. The oil brought new wealth and new people to the most isolated areas.

The discovery of the giant Forties oilfield in October 1970 was an initial sign that Scotland was about to become a major oil producing nation, a view confirmed when Shell Expro discovered the giant Brent oilfield in the northern North Sea east of Shetland the following year. Oil production started from the Argyll field (now Ardmore) in June 1975 followed by Forties in November of that year.

John Brown & Company's shipyard at Clydebank transformed itself from a traditional shipbuilding business to a factor in the high technology offshore oil and gas drilling industry. After 1972, the firm has been owned by three multinational corporations, and its adaptation to drilling has been affected by the complexities of fluctuating international markets and changing technologies. Employment in the yard is far lower.

== See also ==
- Economic history of the United Kingdom
- History of trade unions in the United Kingdom

== Bibliography ==
- Campbell, R. H. Scotland Since 1707: The Rise of an Industrial Society (2nd ed. 1985)
- Houston, R.A. and W. Knox (eds), New Penguin History of Scotland, (2001). ISBN 0-14-026367-5
- Lee, C.H. British regional employment statistics, 1841-1971, Statistical Series, county and regional employment. Cambridge: Cambridge University Press.(1979) ISBN 052122666X
- Lee, C.H. Scotland and the United Kingdom: The Economy and the Union in the twentieth century, Manchester: Manchester University Press.(1995) ISBN 0719041015
- Lenman, Bruce. An Economic History of Modern Scotland, 1660-1976 (1977)
- Lythe, S. G. E An economic history of Scotland, 1100-1939 (1975)
- Mackie, J. D. A History of Scotland (1984) excerpt and text search
- Lynch, Michael, ed. The Oxford Companion to Scottish History. (2007). 732 pp. excerpt and text search
- McNeill, Peter G.B. and Hector L. MacQueen, eds. Atlas of Scottish History to 1707. Edinburgh: The Scottish Medievalists and Department of Geography, 1996.
- Panton, Kenneth J. and Keith A. Cowlard. Historical Dictionary of the United Kingdom. Vol. 2: Scotland, Wales, and Northern Ireland. Scarecrow, 1998. 465 pp.
- Smout, T. C., Alan R. MacDonald, and Fiona Watson. A History of the Native Woodlands of Scotland, 1500-1920 (2007)

=== Since 1700 ===
- Campbell, Alan. Scottish Miners, 1874-1939. vol. 1: Industry, Work & Community; The Scottish Miners, 1874-1939. vol. 2: Trade Unions and Politics (2000)
- Checkland, O. and S. Checkland. Industry and Ethos: Scotland 1832 - 1914 (1989), New History of Scotland excerpt and text search
- Cooke, Anthony. The Rise and Fall of the Scottish Cotton Industry, 1778-1914 (Manchester University Press, 2010) 237 pages
- Daunton, M.J. Progress and Poverty: An Economic and Social History of Britain 1700-1850 (1995)
- Devine, Tom, Clive Lee, and George Peden. The Transformation of Scotland: The Economy since 1700 (2005) excerpt and text search
- Hassan, Gerry ed., The Scottish Labour Party: History, Institutions and Ideas. (2004) 255pp. ISBN 0-7486-1784-1. stress is post 1950
- Hamilton, Henry. An Economic History of Scotland in the Eighteenth Century (1963)
- Hamilton, Henry. Industrial Revolution in Scotland (1966)
- Hood, John. John Brown Engineering: power contractors to the world. (2004) 115pp, makers of heavy-duty gas turbines closed in 2001
- Paterson, Lindsay, et al. Living in Scotland: social and economic change since 1980 (2004) 236pp. ISBN 0-7486-1785-X.
- Turnock, David. Historical geography of Scotland since 1707: geographical aspects of modernisation (1982)
- Weir, Ronald B. The History of the Distillers Company, 1877-1939: Diversification and Growth in Whisky and Chemicals. (1996). 417 pp.
- BBC, 'Has the Brexit fishing promise come true?'https://www.bbc.co.uk/news/64430216

=== Primary sources ===
UK Sea Fisheries https://www.gov.uk/government/statistics/uk-sea-fisheries-annual-statistics-report-2019

- Public Health Scotland https://www.opendata.nhs.scot/dataset/population-estimates/resource/bf086aee-130d-4487-b854-808db0e29dc4
- Campbell, R.H., and J.B.A. Dow. A Source Book of Scottish Economic and Social History (1968)

== See also ==
- Economy of Scotland
- Scottish society
