= List of people from Chattanooga, Tennessee =

The following is a list of notable people who have lived in Chattanooga, Tennessee.

== A ==
- David Manker Abshire, politician and diplomat
- William P. Acker, U.S. Air Force general
- Grant Adcox, race car driver
- Jarrod Alonge, comedian, musician
- John Ankerberg, author, religious broadcaster
- Kay Arthur, author, teacher and television host
- Lovie Austin, jazz blues pianist, bandleader, and composer

== B ==
- Howard Baker, U.S. senator, White House chief of staff
- Coleman Barks, poet and literary interpretor
- Robert Barnes, civil rights attorney and YouTuber
- T. Kevan Bartlett, West Virginia Senate, from the 8th district
- BbyMutha, rapper
- Hugh Beaumont, actor
- Charles K. Bell, politician
- Robert Bernhardt, symphony conductor
- Zane Birdwell, recording engineer
- Peppo Biscarini, swimmer, freediver, businessman
- Jimmy Blanton, musician
- Maci Bookout, starred in MTV's 16 and Pregnant and Teen Mom
- Rachel Boston, actress, pageant winner
- Adarius Bowman, professional football player
- Virginia Frazer Boyle, poet laureate of the United Confederate Veterans and the Confederated Southern Memorial Association
- Bill Brock, U.S. congressman, U.S. senator, chairman of the Republican National Committee, Secretary of Labor
- Kane Brown, country singer/songwriter
- Tony Brown, professional football player
- Daniel Bullocks, professional football player
- Josh Bullocks, professional football player

== C ==
- Mike Cameron, minister and politician; member of Georgia House of Representatives
- Archie Campbell, writer, television performer
- Fred Cash, singer
- Ryan Casteel, catcher for the Atlanta Braves
- Joe Chaney, darts player
- George S. Clinton, composer
- Noah Cobb, soccer player
- Shelby Coffey III, newspaper editor
- Will Marion Cook, composer
- Charles H. Coolidge, decorated military veteran
- Bob Corker, Chattanooga mayor, U.S. senator
- Bill Curry, college football coach, television anchor

== D ==
- Fredrick Davis, ballet dancer
- Jason Davis, professional baseball pitcher
- Bill Dedman, journalist and author
- Juliette Derricotte, educator, political activist
- McKinley "Bunny" Downs (1894–1973), Negro Leagues infielder and manager
- Ellie Dylan, educator, non-profit organization founder

== E ==
- Harris English, professional golfer
- Cal Ermer, professional baseball manager
- Lorenzo Kom'boa Ervin, writer, political activist

== F ==
- JoAnne Favors, state politician
- Chuck Fleischmann, U.S. congressman
- Crystal Marie Fleming (born 1981), sociologist and author
- James B. Frazier, former state governor, Tennessee

== G ==
- Ellis Gardner, offensive lineman for the Kansas City Chiefs and Indianapolis Colts
- Cory Gearrin, relief pitcher for the San Francisco Giants
- Genesis the Greykid, poet, artist, creative
- Betty Lou Gerson, actress
- Gibby Gilbert, professional golfer
- George Gobel, comedian
- Arthur Golden, novelist
- Sam Gooden, pop singer, musician
- Ray Gordy, professional wrestler
- Terry Gordy, professional wrestler
- Irvine W. Grote, chemist, inventor
- Jackson Guice, comic book artist: Death of Superman
- Jo Conn Guild, businessman
- Kirsten Gum, television personality

== H ==
- Ben Haden, pastor, religious broadcaster
- Lee H. Hamilton, former U.S. congressman
- Joycelyn Harrison, Langley Research Center engineer and professor
- Dennis Haskins, actor
- Roland Hayes, singer
- Maud Callaway Hays, clubwoman and genealogist
- Cam Henderson, chief of protocol of the United States
- Calvin C. Hernton, sociologist, poet and author
- Kim Hixson, state politician, Wisconsin
- Ruth Sulzberger Holmberg, newspaper publisher
- Honest Charley, businessman
- Rick Honeycutt, professional baseball player, coach
- Henry H. Horton, former governor of Tennessee
- Jaden Hossler, TikTok personality and singer
- Michael Houser, rock musician
- Rhyne Howard, professional basketball player
- Roy Davage Hudson, neuropharmacologist, president of Hampton University
- George Hunter, business magnate, philanthropist

== J ==
- Samuel L. Jackson, actor
- Patrick Johnson, professional football player
- Leslie Jordan, actor

== K ==
- Zahra Karinshak, Georgia state senator, attorney, Air Force veteran
- Estes Kefauver, former U.S. senator
- Mildred Kelly, first African American female sergeant major of the Army

== L ==
- Venus Lacy, Olympian, basketball player
- Lady Bunny, drag queen
- Yusef Lateef, musician, educator
- James M. Lewis, pharmacist and Tennessee state senator
- Mozella Esther Lewis, pharmacist, businesswoman
- Hormona Lisa, drag queen.
- Natalie Lloyd, children's author
- John Thomas Lupton, Coca-Cola bottler, philanthropist
- Thomas Cartter Lupton, Coca-Cola bottler, philanthropist
- Nick Lutsko, singer-songwriter, comedian, and multi-instrumentalist

== M ==
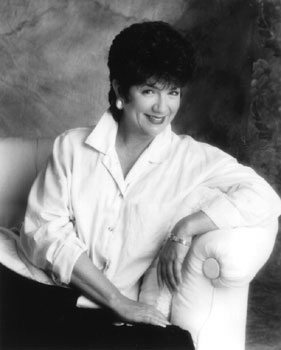
Lurlene McDaniel

- Terry Manning, music producer, photographer
- Ryan Martin, professional boxer
- Virginia Martin, actress
- Mike Massey, professional billiards player
- Ralphie May, comedian
- William Gibbs McAdoo, U.S. Secretary of the Treasury
- Lurlene McDaniel, author
- Ralph McGill, newspaper editor
- Bill McKinney, actor
- Ellis K. Meacham, author
- Jon Meacham, journalist, editor, and author
- Kenneth J. Meyer, politician
- Emma Bell Miles, writer, poet, and artist
- Gustavus Hindman Miller, merchant, manufacturer, financier, capitalist farmer, author and community leader
- Olan Mills Sr., photographer, portrait studio founder
- Jackie Mitchell, professional baseball player
- Keith Mitchell, professional golfer
- Dorothy Montgomery, All-American Girls Professional Baseball League player
- Barry Moser, illustrator
- Scrappy Moore, college football coach

== N ==
- Jim Nabors, actor, singer
- Todd Nance, rock musician

== O ==
- Adolph S. Ochs, newspaper editor, publisher
- Weston Ochse, author and screenwriter
- Terrell Owens, professional football player

== P ==
- Ted Patrick, "father of deprogramming"
- Lori Petty, actress
- John Piper, pastor, theologian
- James Powderly, artist, designer, engineer
- Preston Powell, Olympic weightlifter
- Merv Pregulman, professional football player
- Scotty Probasco, banker and philanthropist

== R ==
- Claude Ramsey, farmer and politician
- Isaiah Rashad, rapper
- Tate Ratledge, Detroit Lions football player
- Wendell Rawls Jr., journalist and author
- Usher Raymond, singer
- Ishmael Reed, novelist
- Olivia Reeves, weightlifter
- Lee Roberson, pastor, educator, religious broadcaster
- Pat Robertson, religious broadcaster, entertainer
- Meredith Russo, young adult author

== S ==
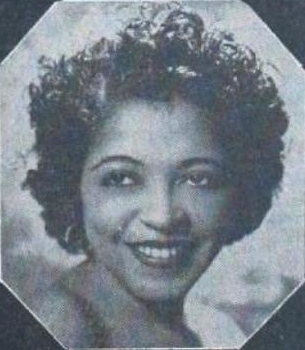
- Valaida Snow
  Terdell Sands, professional football player
- Martin Scott, businessman, educator, politician, and pastor from Georgia
- Tawambi Settles, professional football player
- Adonis Shropshire, songwriter, music producer
- Margaret Sloan-Hunter, magazine editor, political activist
- Bessie Smith, singer
- Lewis Smith, actor
- Valaida Snow, musician
- Mary Q. Steele, author
- William O. Steele, author
- Lynn Stewart, co-founder of the Hooters restaurant chain
- Clyde Stubblefield, musician, drummer for James Brown
- Grady Sutton, actor

== T ==
- May Erwin Talmadge, civic leader and president general of the Daughters of the American Revolution
- Roscoe Tanner, professional tennis player
- Johnny Taylor, professional basketball player
- Benjamin Thomas, Coca-Cola bottler, philanthropist
- Daniel C. Trewhitt, state legislator, judge, and Southern Unionist
- Ted Turner, media magnate, sportsman, philanthropist

== U ==
- Reggie Upshaw (born 1995), basketball player in the Israel Basketball Premier League

== W ==
- Roger Alan Wade, singer-songwriter
- Leon "Daddy Wags" Wagner, professional baseball player
- Mary Hardway Walker, one of the last surviving slaves in America
- Sidney A. Wallace, U.S. Coast Guard admiral
- Zach Wamp, former U.S. congressman
- Jimmy Webb, professional climber
- Pez Whatley, professional wrestler
- Kim White, chief executive officer of River City, the Chattanooga downtown redevelopment authority
- Reggie White, professional football player
- Joseph Whitehead, Coca-Cola bottler, philanthropist
- Bart Whiteman, writer and critic

== See also ==
- List of people from Tennessee
