= Jeff Ray Clark =

Economist

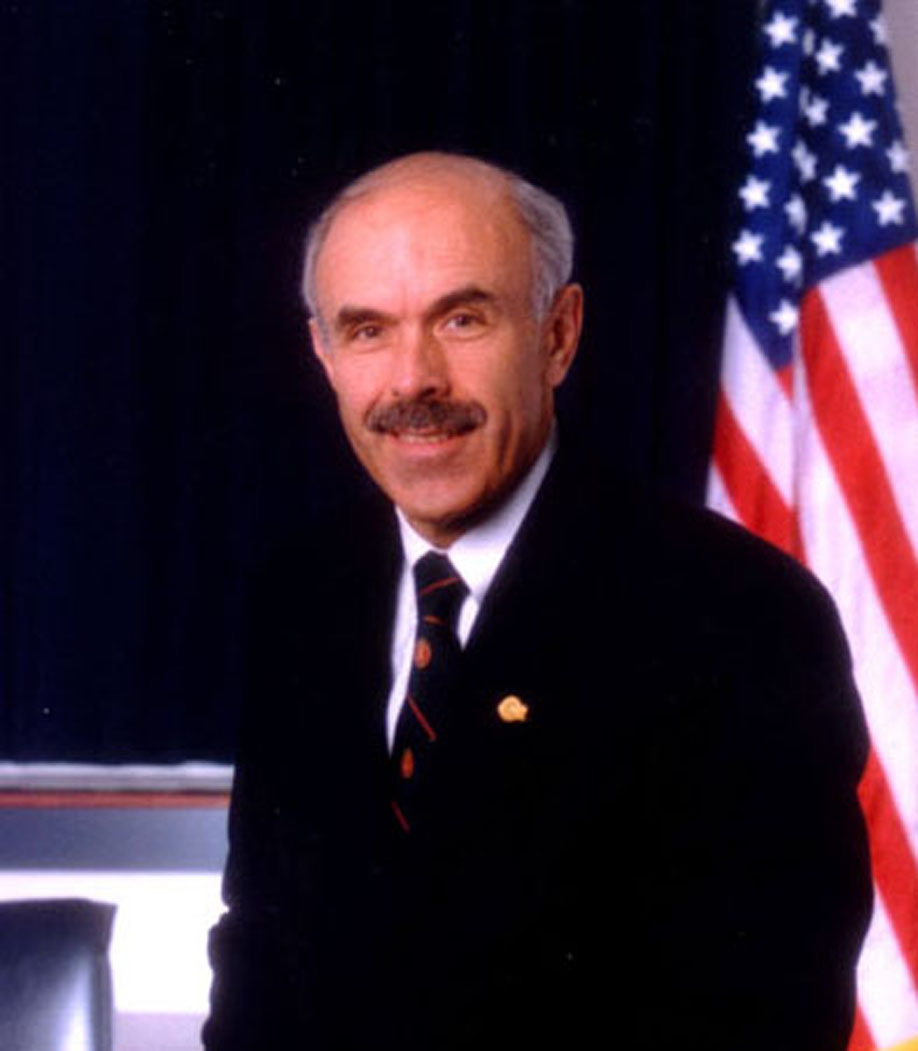
- Born: Waynesboro, Virginia, U.S.
- Education: University of Richmond; Virginia Commonwealth University; Virginia Polytechnic Institute
- Occupation: Economist
- Employer: University of Tennessee at Chattanooga

Jeff Ray Clark is an American economist specializing in public finance, public choice, and managerial economics. He is the Scott L. Probasco, Jr. Chair of Free Enterprise at the University of Tennessee at Chattanooga.

== Education ==
A native of Waynesboro, Virginia, Clark attended the University of Richmond and Virginia Commonwealth University earning the B.S. in economics in 1970. He received the Ph.D. (1974) in Economics from Virginia Polytechnic Institute.

== Professional history ==
Clark held a series of national level administrative positions with the Joint Council on Economic Education in New York from 1974 to 1980. In 1980, he was appointed professor of economics at Fairleigh Dickinson University and chaired a large tri-campus economics and finance department. In 1988, he completed a visiting research fellowship at Princeton University and held the Hendrix Chair at The University of Tennessee at Martin until 1993. Since then, Clark has served as the Scott L. Probasco, Jr. Chair of Free Enterprise at The University of Tennessee at Chattanooga.

Clark has consulting experience in both the public and private sectors and philanthropic experience at the national and institutional level. He has held seats on the boards of The Palmer R. Chitester Fund, the William B. Cockroft Foundation, the Freedoms Foundation, and Kenco Corporation. Clark holds an Airline Transport Pilot rating and currently flies light jet aircraft.

Clark was president of The Association of Private Enterprise Education in 1992. He is currently secretary/treasurer of both The Association of Private Enterprise Education and the Southern Economic Association. In 2006, he was elected to the board of directors for The Mont Pelerin Society, vice president in 2010, and treasurer in 2014. In 2012, he served as vice president, freedom and free enterprise, at the John Templeton Foundation. He is managing editor of The Journal of Private Enterprise and business manager of the Southern Economic Journal.

== Selected books ==
- Freedom and Prosperity in Tennessee, editor, 2012.
- Economics: The Science of Cost, Benefit, and Choice with J. Holton Wilson. Cincinnati: South Western Publishing Co. 1st edition, 1983; 2nd edition, 1987; 3rd edition, 1992; 4th edition, 1997; and 5th edition, 2000.
- Macroeconomics for Managers with Clifford F. Thies, J. Holton Wilson, and Saul Z. Barr. Boston: Allyn & Bacon, 1990.
- Economics: Cost and Choice with Michael Veseth. San Diego: Harcourt Brace Jovanovich, Inc., 1987.
- Essentials of Economics with James D. Gwartney and Richard Stroup. Orlando: Academic Press Inc., 1st edition, 1982 and 2nd edition, 1985. (Japanese translation published in 1984 by Taga Shuppan Publishers Tokyo.)

== Recent selected articles ==
- "The 'Minimal' State Reconsidered: Governance on the Margin" with Benjamin Powell. Review of Austrian Economics, 2017, DOI:10.1007/s11138-017-0400-5.
- "Taxation in the Liberal Tradition" with Robert Lawson. Review of Austrian Economics, 2017, DOI:10.1007/s11138-017-0399-7.
- "The Use of Knowledge in Technology Entrepreneurship: A Theoretical Foundation" with Russell Sobel. Review of Austrian Economics, 2017, DOI: 10.1007/s11138-017-0380-5.
- "Does Mass Immigration Destroy Institutions? 1990s Israel as a Natural Experiment" with Benjamin Powell and Alex Nowrasteh. Journal of Economic Behavior and Organization, 2017, doi.org/10.1016/j.jebo.2017.06.008.
- "The Economics of Brexit" with Scott Niederjohn and Ashley S. Harrison. Social Education, Vol. 81, No. 2, 2017, 84–87.
- "Econ 101 Morality: The Amiable, the Mundane and the Market" with Dwight R. Lee, Econ Journal Watch, Vol. 14, No. 1, 2017, 61–76.
- "Interest Group Activity and Government Growth: A Causality Analysis" with Russ Sobel. Cato Journal, Vol. 36, No. 3, 2016, 207–533.
- "Economic Freedom and Real Income" with Maggie Foley. Journal of Regional Analysis and Policy, Vol. 46, No. 2, 2016, 52–59.
- "The Impact of Higher Quality Government Regulation of Business and Greater Economic Freedom on the Growth and Level of Living Standards: Evidence from OECD Nations" with Richard Cebula. Journal of Entrepreneurship and Public Policy, Vol. 2, No. 1, 2016, 82–94.
- "Higher Costs Appeal to Voters" with Dwight R. Lee. Public Choice, Vol. 166, No. 1, 2016, 1–9.
- "Will the Economy Pick the Next President?" with M. Scott Niederjohn and Ashley S. Harrison. Social Education, Vol. 80, No. 2, 2016, 96–100.
- "Dangling at the Abyss: How Deadweight Costs and Political Attitudes May Prevent (or Induce) Collapse" with John Garen. Journal of Public Finance and Public Choice, Vol. 31, No. 1-3, 2014 printed in 2016, 3-21.
- "Jack Soper: A Pioneer in Economic Education" with Ashley S. Harrison and Joshua C. Hall. Journal of Private Enterprise Education, Vol. 21. No. 1, 2016, 91–100.
- "Trust and the Growth of Government" with John Garen. "Cato Journal", Vol. 35, No. 3, 2015, 549–580.
- "Overcoming Barriers to Entry in an Established Industry: Tesla Motors," with Edward P. Stringham and Jennifer K. Miller. California Management Review, Vol. 57, No. 4, 2015, 85–103.
- "Does Immigration Impact Institutions?" with Robert Lawson, Alex Nowrastch, Benjamin Powell, and Ryan Murphy. Public Choice, Vol. 163, No. 3-4, 2015, 321–335.
- "Is Bitcoin the Money of the Future?" with M. Scott Niederjohn and Ashley S. Harrison. Social Education, Vol. 79, No. 2, 2015, 94–97.
- "In Remembrance of Gordon Tullock" with Dwight R. Lee. Public Choice, Vol. 162, No. 3-4, 2015, 225–227.
- "The Effects of Economic Freedom, Regulatory Quality, and Taxation on the Level of Per Capita Real Income: A Preliminary Analysis for OECD Nations and Non-G8 OECD Nations" with Richard J. Cebula. Applied Economics, Vol. 46, No. 31, 2014, 3836–3848.
- "Freedom and Economic Education: Jim Gwartney at the Crossroads." The Annual Proceedings of the Wealth and Well-Being of Nations, Upton Forum, Vol. VI, 2013–2014, 67–81.
- "Buchanan and Tullock Ignore Their Own Contributions to Expressive Voting" with Dwight R. Lee. Public Choice, Vol. 161, No. 1-2, 2014, 113–118.
- "Preference Formation, Choice Sets, and the Creative Destruction of Preferences" with Russell S. Sobel. The Journal of Ayn Rand Studies, Vol. 14, No. 1, 2014, 55–74.
- "The Problem with the Holdout Problem" with Edward J. Lopez. Review of Law & Economics, Vol. 9, No. 2, 2014, 151–167.
- "A Presidential Tribute to James M. Buchanan: In Appreciation of the Man, His Work, and His Example" with Dwight R. Lee. Southern Economic Journal, Vol. 80, No. 4, 2014, 905–911.
- "Battling the Forces of Darkness: How Can Economic Freedom Be Effectively Taught in the Pre-College Curriculum?" with Ashley S. Harrison and Mark C. Schug. The Journal of Private Enterprise, Vol. XXIX, No. 1, 2013, 87–100.
- "An Extension of the Tiebout Hypothesis of Voting with One's Feet: The Medicaid Magnet Hypothesis" with Richard J. Cebula. Applied Economics, Vol. 45, No. 32, 2013, 4575–4583.
- "The Impact of Economic Freedom on Per Capita Real GDP: A Study of OECD Nations" with Richard J. Cebula and Franklin G. Mixon Jr. The Journal of Regional Analysis & Policy, Vol. 43, No. 1, 2013, 34–41.
- "Sweatshop Working Conditions and Employee Welfare: Say It Ain't Sew" with Benjamin Powell. Comparative Economic Studies, Vol. 55, No. 2, 2013, 343–357.
- "Market Failures, Government Solutions, and Moral Perceptions" with Dwight R. Lee. Cato Journal, Vol. 33, No. 2, 2013, 287–297.
- "An Economic Analysis of the Effects of Fair-Trade with Rumination on the Popularity of Economists" with Dwight R. Lee. Journal of Public Finance and Public Choice, Vol. 28, No. 2/3, 2012, 133–145.
- "Beyond Kelly Green Golf Shoes: Evaluating the Demand for Scholarship of Free-Market and Mainstream Economists" with Jennifer Miller-Wilford and Edward Peter Stringham. The American Journal of Economics & Sociology, Vol. 71, No. 5, 2012, 1143–1280.
- "Lessons from the Experience of OECD Nations on Macroeconomic Growth and Economic Freedom, 2004-2008" with Richard J. Cebula. International Review of Economics, Vol. 59, No. 3, 2012, 231–243.
- "Just Wait Until It's Free" with Dwight R. Lee. The Freeman: Ideas on Liberty, Vol. 62, No. 6, July/August 2012, 11–16.
- "All We Know That May Be So in Economic Education" with Mark C. Schug and Ashley S. Harrison. Social Studies Research and Practice, Vol. 7, No. 1, Spring 2012, 1–8.
- "Markets and Morality" with Dwight R. Lee. Cato Journal, Vol. 31, No. 1, Winter 2011, 1-25. Reprinted 2015 in German and English in "Markets and Morality," Der Markt und seine moralischen Grundlagen: Diskussionsmaterial zu einem Aufsatz von Jeff R. Clark und Dwight R. Lee, Verlag Karl Alber/Munchen 2015.
- "Shrinking Leviathan: Can the Interaction Between Interests and Ideology Slice Both Ways?" with Dwight R. Lee. The Independent Review, Vol. 16, No. 2, Fall 2011, 221–236.
- "Internalizing Externalities Through Private Zoning: The Case of Walt Disney Company's Celebration, Florida" with Edward P. Stringham and Jennifer K. Miller. Journal of Regional Analysis & Policy, Vol. 40, No. 2, 2010, 96–103.
- "Examining the Hayek-Friedman Hypothesis on Economic and Political Freedom" with Robert A. Lawson. Journal of Economic Behavior & Organization, Vol. 74, No. 3, Spring 2010, 230–239.
- "Suppressing Liberty, Censoring Information, Wasting Resources, and Calling It Good for the Environment" with Dwight R. Lee. Social Philosophy and Policy, Vol. 26, No. 2, Summer 2009, 272–295.
- "Censoring and Destroying Information in the Information Age" with Dwight R. Lee. Cato Journal, Vol. 28, No. 3, Fall 2008, 421–434.
- "Are Regulations the Answer for Emerging Stock Markets? Evidence from the Czech Republic and Poland" with Peter J. Boettke and Edward Stringham. Quarterly Review of Economics and Finance, Vol. 48, No. 3, August 2008, 541–566.
- "Freedom, Barriers to Entry, Entrepreneurship, and Economic Progress" with Russell S. Sobel and Dwight R. Lee. Review of Austrian Economics, Vol. 20, No. 4, August 2007, 221–226.
- "Workers Should Want to Pay More for Social Security" with Dwight R. Lee. Economic Inquiry, Vol. 44, No. 4, Fall 2006, 753–758.
- "The Poverty of Politics: How Income Redistribution Hurts the Poor" with Gordon Tullock and Leon S. Levy. The Atlantic Economic Journal, Vol. 34, No. 1, March 2006, 47–62.
- "Economic Freedom of the World, 2002" with Robert A. Lawson and James D. Gwartney. The Independent Review, Vol. IX, No. 4, Spring 2005, 573–593.
- "The Increasing Difficulty of Reversing Government Growth: A Prisoners' Dilemma That Gets Worse with Time" with Dwight R. Lee. Journal of Public Finance and Public Choice, Vol. XXI, Rome, Italy, 2003-2/3, 151–165.
- "The Optimal Trust in Government" with Dwight R. Lee. Eastern Economic Journal, Vol. 27, No. 1, Winter 2001, 19–34.
- "The Economics of Moral Imperatives." The Journal of Economics, Vol. XXV, No. 1, July 1999, 1–8.
- "Too Safe to Be Safe: Some Implications of Short- and Long-Run Rescue Laffer Curves" with Dwight R. Lee. Eastern Economic Journal, Vol. 23, No. 2, Spring 1997, 127–137.
- "Sentencing Laffer Curves, Political Myopia, and Prison Space" with Dwight R. Lee. The Social Science Quarterly, Vol. 77, No. 2, June 1996, 245–259. Abstracted in "Sentencing Laffer Curves, Political Myopia, and Prison Space" with Dwight R. Lee. Journal of Economic Literature, Vol. 36, No. 4, December 1998.
- "The Political Economy of Dissonance" with Gordon L. Brady and William Davis. Public Choice, Vol. 82, No. 1/2, January 1995, 37–51.
