= Hunter Museum of American Art =

Art museum in Chattanooga, Tennessee

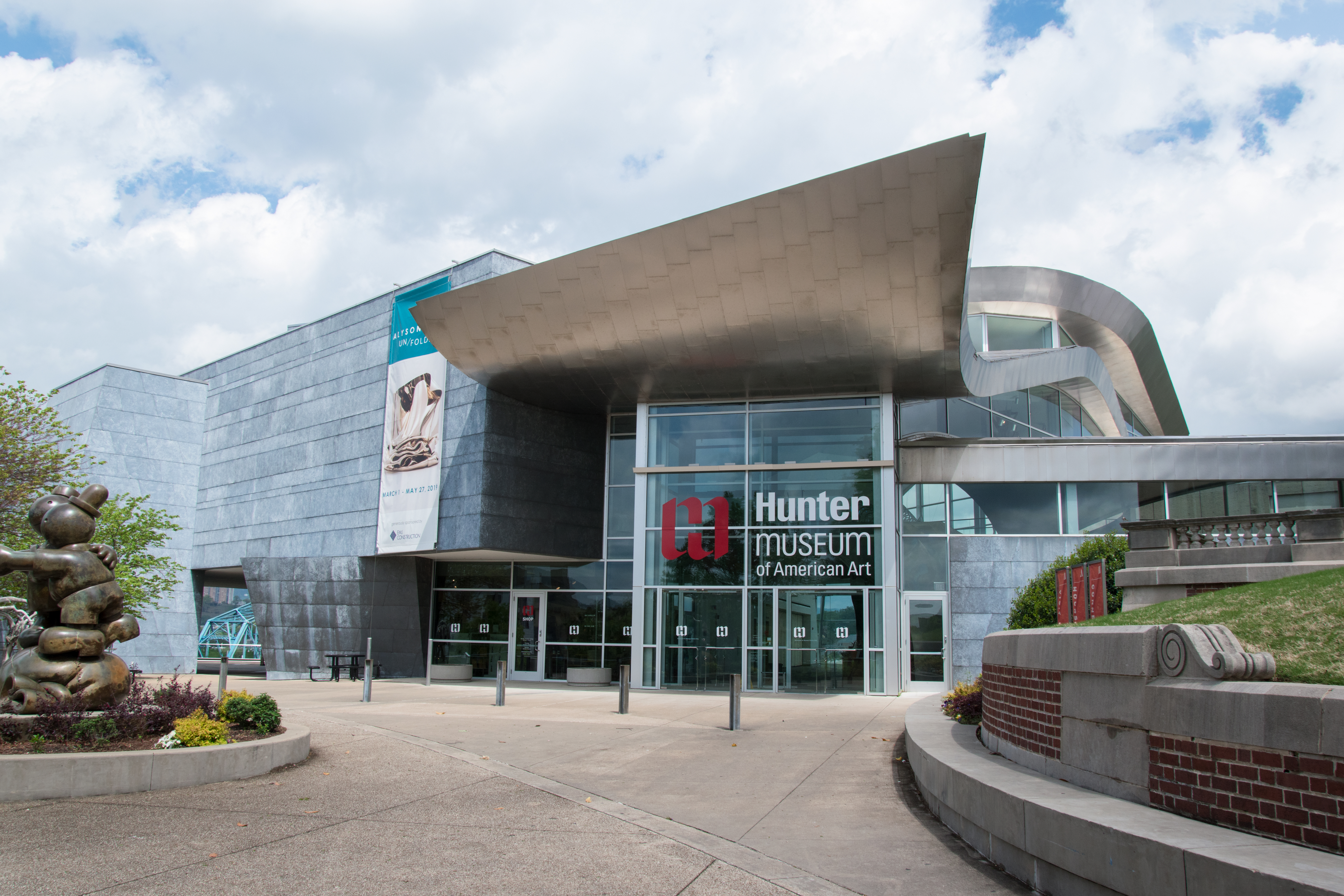
- Museum entrance
- Established: 1952
- Location: 10 Bluff View Ave., Chattanooga, Tennessee, United States
- Coordinates: 35°3′21.4″N 85°18′23.2″W
- Collection size: over 3,000 works
- Visitors: 65,000 (2022)
- Employees: 11-50
- Public transit access: at Chattanooga Area Regional Transportation Authority
- Website: huntermuseum.org
- Faxon-Thomas Mansion
- U.S. National Register of Historic Places
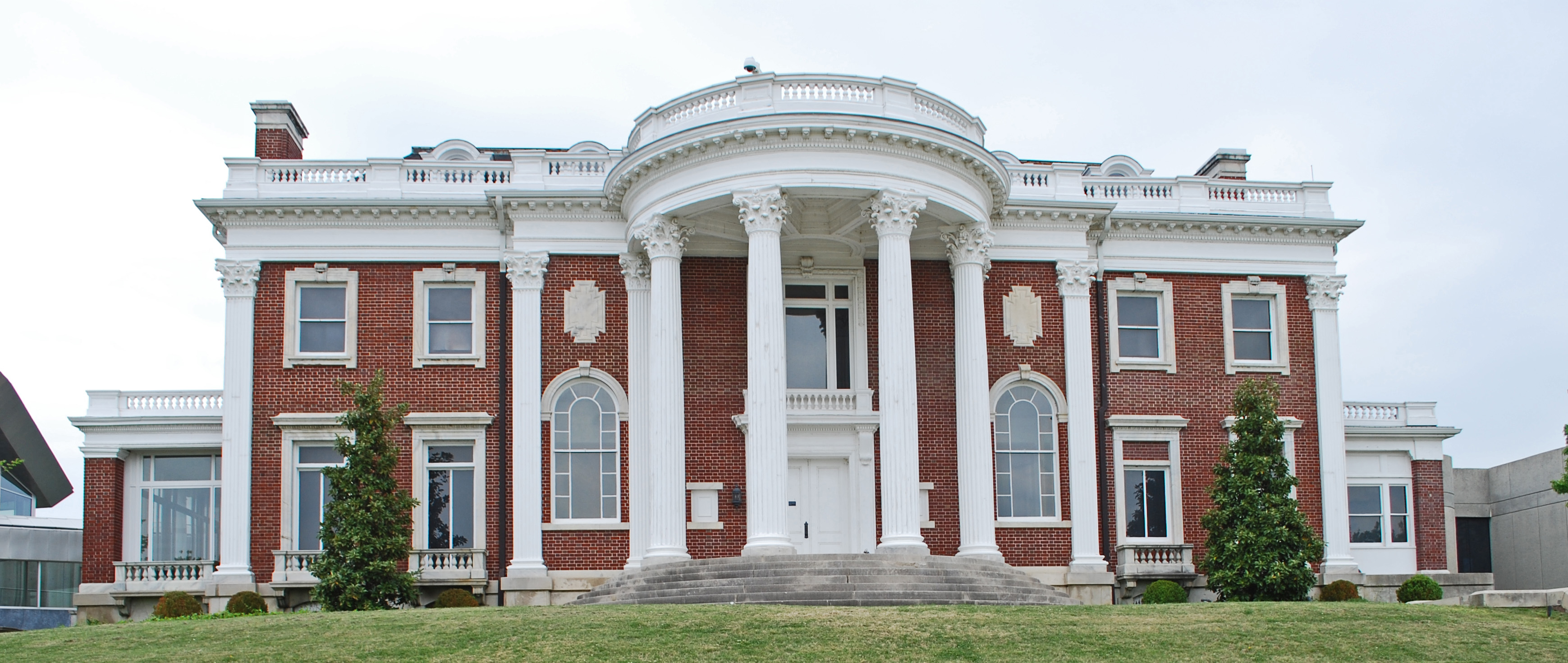
- The Faxon-Thomas Mansion, the original section of the museum
- Area: 1.4 acres (0.57 ha)
- Built: 1906
- Architect: Abram Garfield
- Architectural style: Colonial Revival
- NRHP reference No.: 80003809
- Added to NRHP: November 25, 1980

The Hunter Museum of American Art is an art museum in Chattanooga, Tennessee. The museum's collections include works representing the Hudson River School, 19th century genre painting, American Impressionism, the Ashcan School, early modernism, regionalism, and post-World War II modern and contemporary art.

The building itself represents three distinct architectural stages: the original 1904 classical revival mansion designed by Abram Garfield, the son of president James A. Garfield, which has housed the museum since its opening in 1952, a brutalist addition built in 1975, and a 2005 addition designed by Randall Stout which now serves as the entrance to the museum.

== Location ==
The museum is situated on an 80-foot (24 m) bluff overlooking the Tennessee River, the Walnut Street Bridge, and downtown Chattanooga. The Faxon House, built in 1904, was built where a Confederate battery had been emplaced. Once a prestigious address for Victorian houses, the area is now home to the Bluff View Art District. The Ruth S. and A. William Holmberg Pedestrian Bridge provides a pedestrian-friendly connection to the nearby Walnut Street Bridge and riverfront attractions.

== History ==
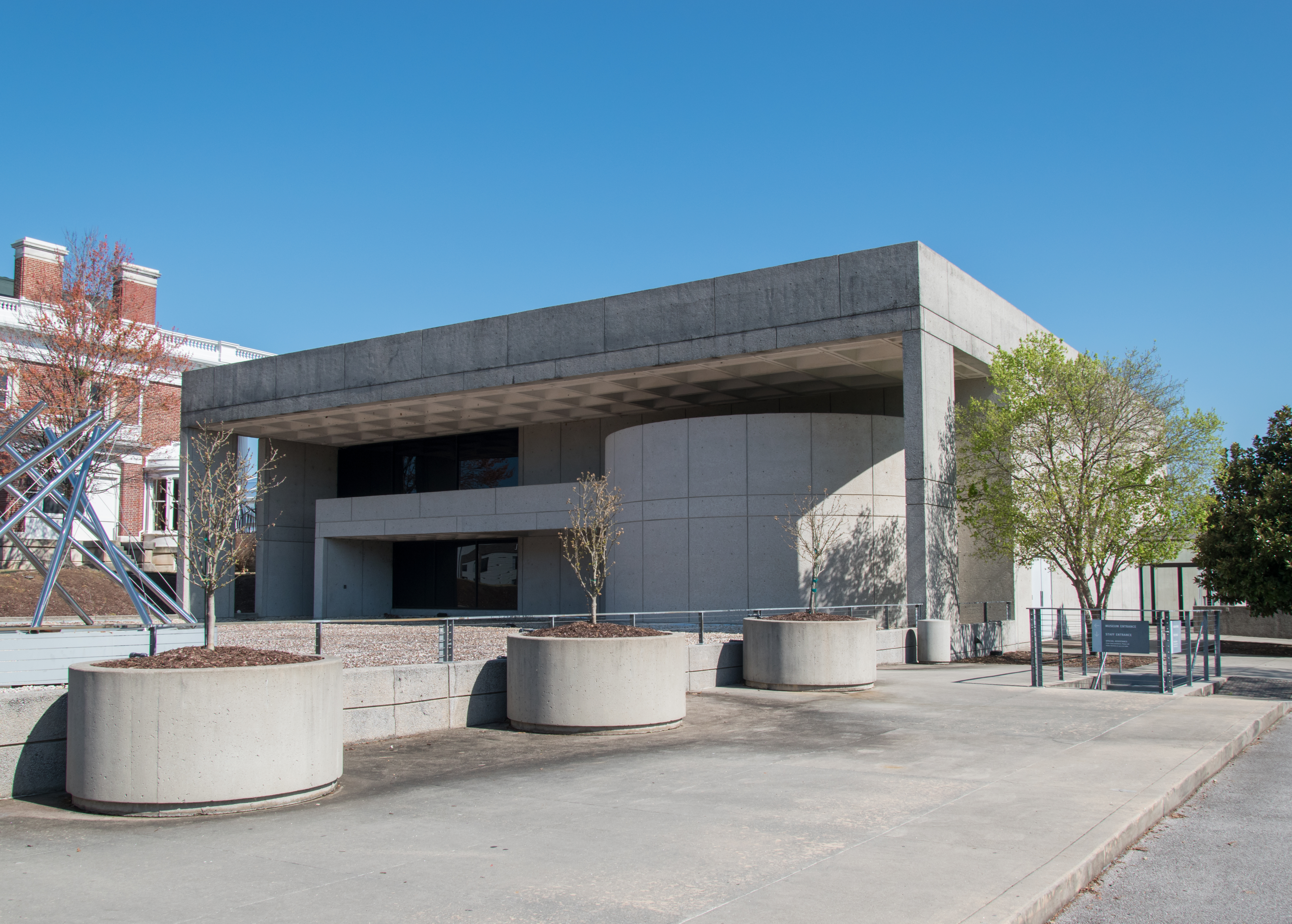
1975 brutalist wing

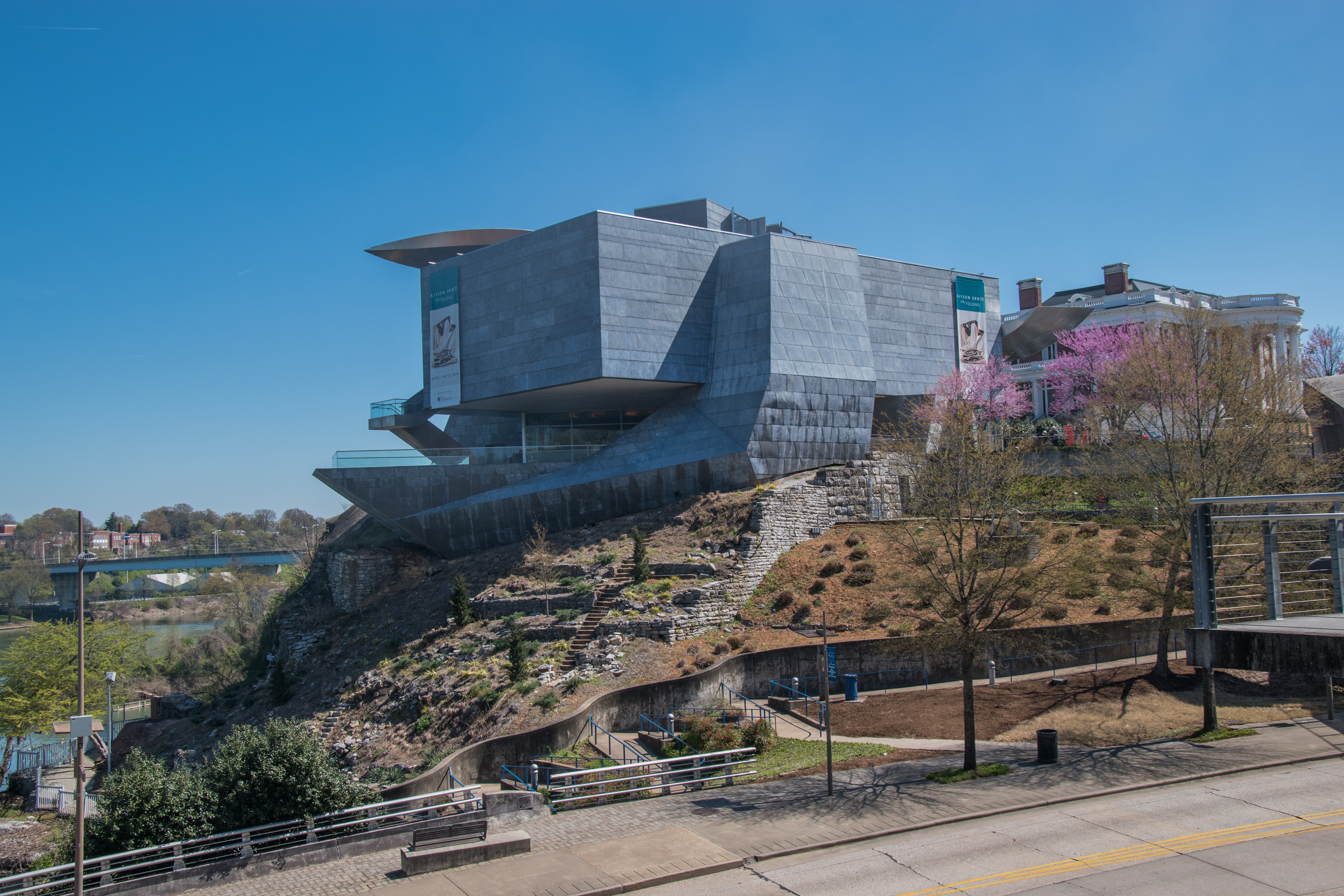
Modern wing of the Hunter Museum

The Hunter Museum is named after George Hunter, who inherited the Coca-Cola Bottling empire from his uncle Benjamin Thomas. Thomas was one of the entrepreneurs who created Chattanooga's Coca-Cola bottling empire. Their nephew, George Hunter, later joined Anne Thomas to create a philanthropic organization in Hunter's memory named the Benwood Foundation. The foundation's mission was to "promote religious, charitable, scientific, literary and educational activities for the advancement or well being of mankind". The centerpiece of the Benwood Foundation's gifts to the community of Chattanooga is the Hunter Museum of American Art, originally known as the Ross Faxon House.

=== Expansion ===
In 2002 the Hunter Museum of American Art partnered with the City of Chattanooga, the Tennessee Aquarium and the Creative Discovery Museum to finish the 21st Century Waterfront Plan. "The Hunter Museum portion of the project included a $22 million expansion and renovation, designed by Randall Stout that was completed in 2005. The project included 28,000 square feet of new construction, 34,000 square feet of renovation, a new entrance, a temporary exhibition space, restoration of the mansion, the creation of an outdoor sculpture garden, and a complete reinstallation of the Museum's permanent collection."

=== Present day ===
The Hunter Museum of American Art includes 100 years of architectures and the most complete collection of American art in the Southeast. The museum also travels nationally for exhibits and curated shows. "The collection spans from the colonial period to present day and covers a wide variety of media including painting, sculpture, contemporary studio glass, and crafts."

In 2006 the museum received national recognition from the Innovative Design in Engineering and Architecture with Structural Steels awards program. "The award recognizes outstanding achievements in engineering and architecture on structural steel projects around the country. The Hunter Museum project earned Merit Award recognition in the category of Projects $15–$75 million."

In June 2015, the Hunter Museum of Art announced on its website that it had chosen a new executive director, Virginia Ann Sharber.
