= W. Michael Cox =

American economist (born 1950)

W. Michael Cox (born August 7, 1950) is an American economist, speaker, and consultant. An outspoken libertarian, he comments on society, politics, and the benefits of a free market society. Cox is currently the Director of the O'Neil Center for Global Markets and Freedom at Southern Methodist University's Cox School of Business.

== Early life ==
W. Michael Cox was born in Little Rock, Arkansas to parents Thomas Edward and Nanalee Cox in 1950. He gained an understanding of business at an early age by working weekends and summers in his father's cold beverage company. Seeing taxes taken out of his first paycheck proved to be the first step toward his strong dislike for government. Cox attended Little Rock Central High School, graduating in 1968. He continued his education at Hendrix College, earning a bachelor's degree with magna cum laude honors in mathematics and business economics in 1972. He then studied at Tulane University, where he received his Ph.D. in economics in 1976.

== Career ==
Cox worked as an assistant professor at Virginia Polytechnic Institute and State University from 1976 through 1984. During this time he took leave to work as a visiting assistant professor for the University of Rochester and the University of Western Ontario. In 1984, he left academia to become a practicing economist, and became a research economist at the Federal Reserve Bank of Dallas. He was later promoted to Chief Economist, and holds the unique distinction of being the only Chief Economist in the Federal Reserve System's history. While at the Fed, he also served as an adjunct professor at Southern Methodist University in Dallas. He retired from the Dallas Fed in 2009 to become the Director for the O'Neil Center. The focus of the O'Neil Center is the study of the impact of competitive market forces on freedom and prosperity in the global economy.

Cox has been widely published in the nation's leading business press, academic journals and Federal Reserve System publications. Cox is the author of numerous op-ed articles for The Wall Street Journal, The New York Times, USA Today, Financial Times and Investor's Business Daily. He also co-authored the Fed's acclaimed series of annual report essays on capitalism, globalization and American living standards. Additionally, he has contributed to a number of public policy issues and his research is frequently designated as required reading for Congress. His book, Myths of Rich and Poor: Why We're Better Off than We Think, co-authored by Richard Alm, was nominated for a Pulitzer Prize. He is a frequent guest on national radio, television and Internet programs, including CNN, Fox News, National Public Radio, ReasonTV, Voice of America and BizRadio.

Cox's life work has been devoted to studying how free markets work to improve living standards. He has documented progress in America by defining living standards as a measure of:

1. Consumption and Wealth
2. Leisure and Recreation
3. Variety and Choice
4. Safety and Security
5. Working Conditions

In his book, Myths of Rich and Poor: Why We're Better Off Than We Think (with Richard Alm), Cox has comprehensively documented American progress and its primary delivery mechanism – free markets. He continues to be a leader in the free-enterprise movement.

Cox is also an Adjunct Scholar at the Cato Institute, a Senior Fellow at the National Center for Policy Analysis, a member of the Mont Pelerin Society, and is a past President of the Association of Private Enterprise Education.

== Publications ==
- Books
  - Myths of Rich and Poor: Why We're Better Off Than We Think (with Richard Alm). New York: Basic Books, (1999).
  - Cox, W. Michael and Richard Alm, 'Incentives', in The 4% Solution: Unleashing the Economic Growth America Needs, edited by Brendan Miniter. New York: Crown Business. 2012.
- Journal articles
  - "Variety, Globalization, and Social Efficiency," Southern Economic Journal. (2010).
  - "An Economic Interpretation of Suicide Cycles in Japan" (with Jahyeong Koo). Contemporary Economic Policy, vol. 26, no. 1, pp. 62–174, (January, 2008).
  - "Proof That a Free Market System Enriches the Poor." Journal of Private Enterprise, vol. 17, no. 1, pp. 1–16, (Fall, 2001).
  - "Country-bashing Tariffs: Do Bilateral Trade Deficits Matter?" (with Roy Ruffin). Journal of International Economics, vol. 46, no. 1, pp. 61–72, (October, 1998).
  - "The Capital Gains and Losses on U.S. Government Debt: 1942–1986" (with Cara S. Lown). The Review of Economics and Statistics, vol. 71, no. 1, pp. 1–14, (February, 1989).
  - "The Market Value of Government of Canada Debt, Monthly, 1937–84" (with Joseph Haslag). Canadian Journal of Economics, vol. 19, no. 3, pp. 469–497, (August, 1986).
  - "The Behavior of Treasury Securities Monthly, 1942–1984." Journal of Monetary Economics, vol. 16, no. 2, pp. 227–250, (September, 1985).
  - "Government Revenue from Deficit Finance." Canadian Journal of Economics, vol. 16, no. 2, pp. 264–274, (May, 1983).
  - "The Market Value of U.S. Government Debt; Monthly, 1942–1980" (with W. Eric Hirschhorn). Journal of Monetary Economics, vol. 11, no. 2, pp. 261–272, (March, 1983).
  - "Unanticipated Money, Output, and Prices in the Small Economy." Journal of Monetary Economics, vol. 6, no. 3, pp. 359–84, (July, 1980).
  - "Unanticipated Money, Output, and Prices in the Small Economy" (with Halbert White). Economics Letters, vol. 1, no. 1, pp. 23–27, (1978).
- Op Eds
  - "An Order of Prosperity, To Go," The New York Times, February 17, 2010.
  - "Virtual Immigrants Bring Benefits Without Leaving Their Countries," Investor's Business Daily, February 1, 2010.
  - "Obama, In Rich Irony, Can't Afford to Wage War on Nation's Wealthy," Investor's Business Daily, August 18, 2009.
  - "From Teflon to Tarzan, The 30s' Proved Capitalism Never Sleeps," Investor's Business Daily, May 25, 2009.
  - "You Are What You Spend" (with Richard Alm), The New York Times, February 10, 2008.
  - "Globalization's Gifts" (with Richard W. Fisher), Dallas Morning News, April 13, 2007.
  - "The New Inflation Equation" (with Richard W. Fisher). The Wall Street Journal, April 6, 2007.
  - "Globalizing Good Government" (with Richard W. Fisher). The New York Times
