= Benjamin Powell =

American economist (born 1978)

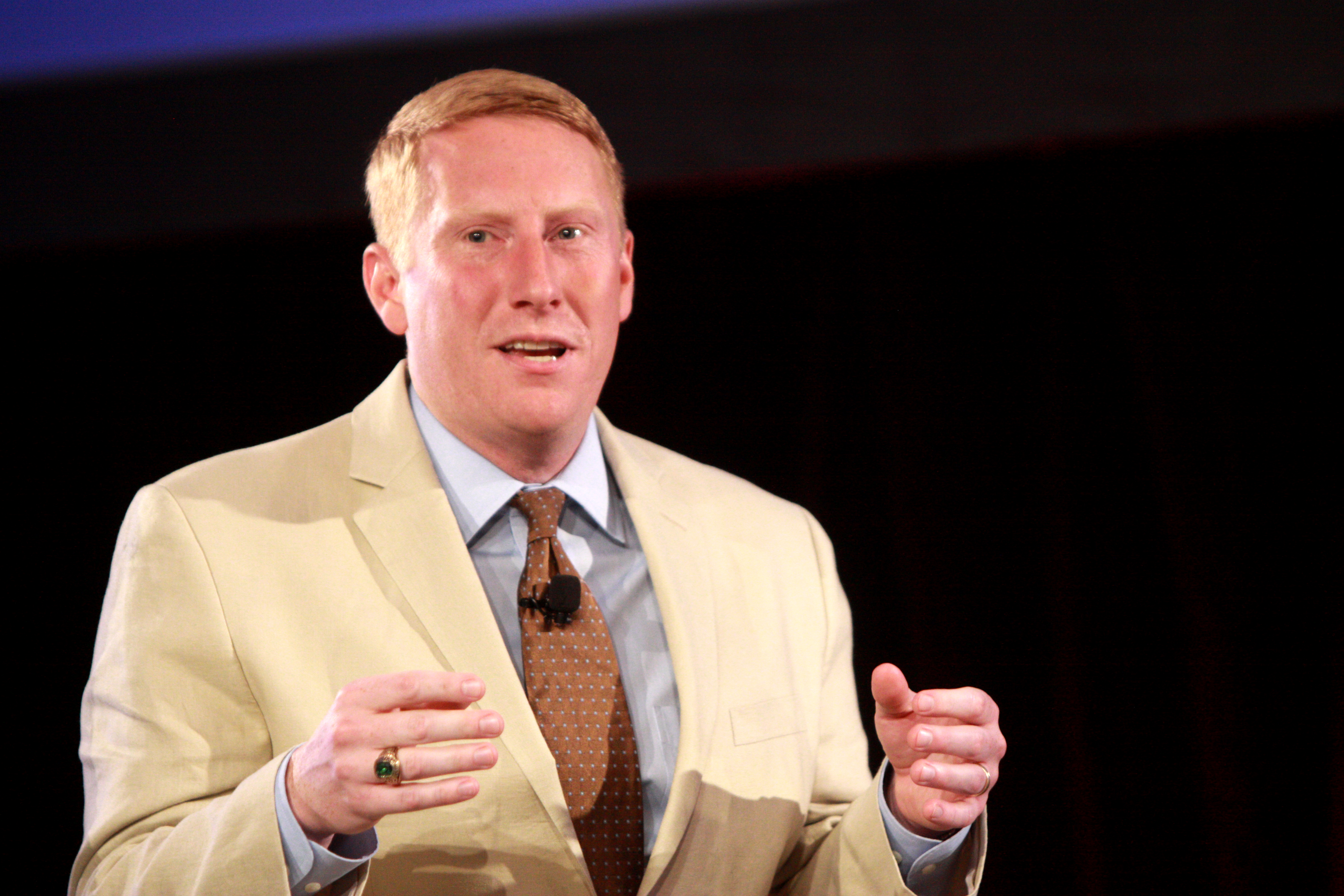
Ben Powell speaking at the 2013 FreedomFest in Las Vegas, Nevada.

Benjamin W. "Ben" Powell (born 1978) is the director of the Free Market Institute at Texas Tech University and professor of economics at Texas Tech University's Rawls College of Business. He is also a junior fellow at the Independent Institute and the South American editor of the Review of Austrian Economics.

== Biography ==
Benjamin Powell earned his B.A. in finance and economics from the University of Massachusetts Lowell and his M.A. and Ph.D. in economics from George Mason University. He is a professor of economics at Texas Tech University's Rawls College of Business and the executive director of the Free Market Institute at Texas Tech University. Previously, he was an associate professor of economics at Suffolk University and an assistant professor of economics at San Jose State University. Other past role have included director of the Center on Entrepreneurial Innovation at the Independent Institute, president of the Association of Private Enterprise Education, North American editor of the Review of Austrian Economics, senior economist at the Beacon Hill Institute, editorial board member at the Journal of Private Enterprise, and host and co-executive producer of KTTZ Channel 5 Lubbock's – a PBS affiliate – Free to Exchange.

== Research ==
=== Sweatshops ===
Powell's academic interest in sweatshops dates back to at least 2004, when he wrote a working paper along with David Skarbek for the Independent Institute looking at how sweatshop jobs compared with the other jobs available to people who took them. The working paper was later published as an article for the Journal of Labor Research. Powell also wrote an article for Human Rights Quarterly, responding to the argument by Arnold and Hartman (2006) that activists should encourage sweatshop employers to voluntarily work toward improving the conditions of sweatshop workers. Powell has since written journal articles on sweatshops for the Journal of Business Ethics and Comparative Economic Studies and has also written about sweatshops based on his research in other venues, such as Forbes, The Christian Science Monitor, and Dallas Morning News. He has also summarized his arguments in a 3-minute video for LearnLiberty.

=== Economic and political systems ===
Powell has studied the economics of anarchy. He wrote a journal article along with Ryan Ford and Alex Nowrasteh comparing Somalia before and after it transitioned to anarchy.

Powell has also co-authored with Edward Stringham a paper on public choice theory and its implications for the economics of anarchy.

== Books ==
Powell was the editor of the 2007 volume Making Poor Nations Rich: Entrepreneurship and the Process of Economic Development published by the Independent Institute in collaboration with Stanford University Press as part of the Stanford Economics and Finance series. He also edited The Economics of Immigration: Market-based Approaches, Social Science, and Public Policy (Oxford University Press, 2015).

He is the author of Out of Poverty: Sweatshops in the Global Economy (Cambridge University Press, 2014).

With Robert Lawson, he is the co-author of Socialism Sucks: Two Economists Drink Their Way Through the Unfree World (Regnery Press, 2019).
