= Edward Stringham =

American economist (born 1975)

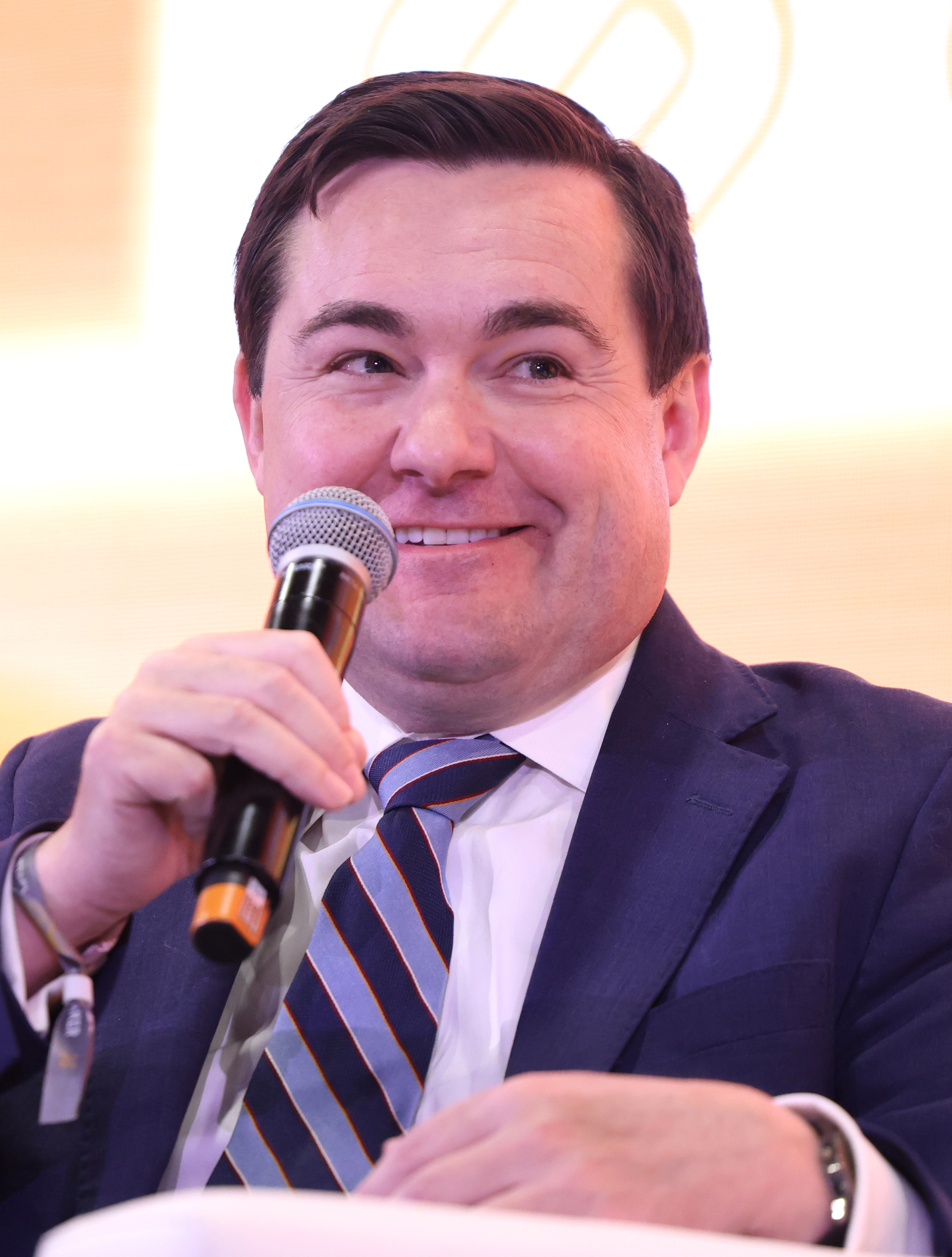
- Stringham in 2025
- Born: January 18, 1975 (age 50)

Academic background
- Education: College of the Holy Cross (BA); George Mason University (MA, PhD)
- Influences: Ludwig von Mises; Friedrich Hayek; Murray Rothbard; David D. Friedman; Walter Block

Academic work
- Discipline: Political economy
- School or tradition: Austrian School
- Institutions: San Jose State University; Trinity College, Connecticut
- Website: Information at IDEAS / RePEc

Edward Peter Stringham (born January 18, 1975) is an Austrian School American economist, former President of the American Institute for Economic Research in Great Barrington, Massachusetts (until May 2021), and the Davis Professor of Economic Innovation at Trinity College (Connecticut).

== Education ==
Stringham received a B.A. in economics from College of the Holy Cross and his Ph.D. from George Mason University. His dissertation was titled "Essays on Self-Policing in Financial Markets".

== Career ==
He was associate professor at San Jose State University from 2002 to 2008, the F.A. Hayek Endowed visiting professor at University of Klagenfurt in 2008, and Shelby Cullom Davis visiting associate professor at Trinity College from 2008 to 2010. He has also held faculty positions at Fayetteville State University and Texas Tech University.

He has been the editor of the Journal of Private Enterprise since 2006. Additionally, he served as the President of the Association of Private Enterprise Education from 2006 to 2007. He has edited Anarchy, State and Public Choice (2005) and Anarchy and the Law: The Political Economy of Choice (2007).

In 2006, he published a study together with Bethany Peters titled "No Booze? You May Lose: Why Drinkers Earn More Money Than Nondrinkers" (with the Reason Foundation). For that seeming controversial statement, he made numerous television appearances. In 2009 and 2010 he published the related "The Catastrophe of What Passes for Alcohol Policy Analysis" and he gave testimony before the Connecticut legislature on alcohol restrictions.

== Interviews and discussions ==
In an interview with Forbes in 2019, Stringham opposed any tax and social security.

In May 2020, Stringham said during a CNBC interview that the unemployment rate was expected to reach 16% but that the slight improvements were already noticeable.

In July 2020, The Christian Science Monitor discussed the question "Why libertarians are joining BLM calls to defund police". Stringham pointed out a lot of parallels with the libertarians believing that the responsibilities of police departments today would be better performed by local private security bodies and suitable alternatives to state police as adopted in some other countries.

== Media appearances ==
Stringham has appeared on dozens of media outlets including CNBC, Fox News, MTV, and NPR.

== Bibliography ==
- Private Governance: Creating Order in Economic and Social Life. Oxford University Press. 2015. ISBN 978-0199365166.
- Stringham, Edward Peter (2018). "Part IV: What Is the Role of the State?; Ch. 22: Private Governance". In Brennan, Jason; van der Vossen, Bas; Schmidtz, David (eds.). The Routledge Handbook of Libertarianism. London and New York: Taylor & Francis Group. pp. 312–322. ISBN 978-0367870591.
