= Margaret Wootten Collier =

American writer (1869–1947)

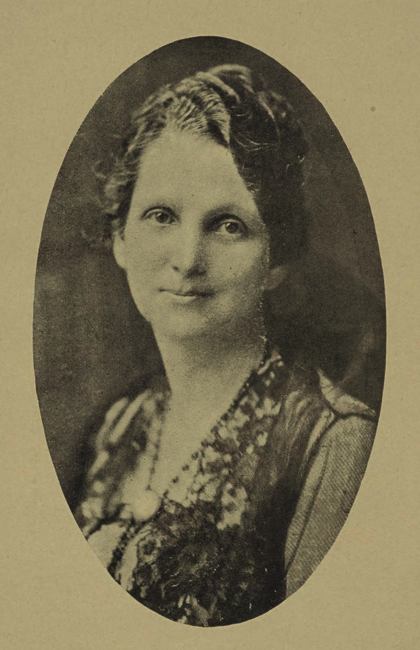
- Born: Margaret Wootten; December 9, 1869; Walker County, Georgia, U.S.
- Died: January 6, 1947 (aged 77); Atlanta, Georgia
- Education: LaGrange Female College
- Occupation: Writer
- Spouse: Bryan Wells Collier (m. 1897; died 1937)
- Children: 2
- Writing career
- Pen name: Mrs. Bryan Wells Collier
- Genre: Biographies
- Subject: Southern United States
- Notable work: Representative Women of the South
- Literary movement: Southern Renaissance

Margaret Wootten Collier (née, Wootten; pen name, Mrs. Bryan Wells Collier; December 9, 1869 – January 6, 1947) was an American writer of the Southern Renaissance era. She was the author of the seven volume Representative Women of the South, 1861-1925 (1920, 1923, 1925), and was the official biographer of the Confederated Southern Memorial Association.

== Early life and education ==
Margaret Marion Wootten was born in Walker County, Georgia, December 9, 1869. She was the youngest daughter of John Fletcher Wootten, M. D., of Wilkes County, Georgia, and Margaret Marion (Hendrix) Wootten. Collier was one of four sisters, three of whom married ministers.

Collier graduated from Dalton Female Academy and LaGrange Female College. She did special study of music under Professor Henry Schoeller and Alfredo Barili.

== Career ==
Biographies of representative women of the South

Collier was the author of the poem, "In My Garden of Love" (1925). She also edited the multi-volume Representative Women of the South, 1861-1920, 1920; Representative Women of the South, 1861-1923, 1923; and Representative Women of the South, 1861-1925, 1925. Every State where there was a Chapter of the two Southern organizations -Memorial Association and Daughters of the Confederacy- was represented in this compilation. Included were pictures and sketches of Children of the Confederacy.

She was a member of the National League of American Pen Women and of the National Society Daughters of the American Colonists; historian of the Atlanta Chapter of the Daughters of the American Revolution (D.A.R.; 1923–25); Corresponding Secretary General of Confederated Memorial Association (beginning in 1917); and president of the Robert Lee Chapter, United Daughters of the Confederacy (College Park, Georgia).

== Personal life ==
On December 9, 1897, she married the Rev. Bryan Wells Collier (1868-1937) of Griffin, Georgia. Their children were Bryan Wootten (born 1899) and Thomas Wootten (born 1902).

Margaret Wootten Collier died in Atlanta, Georgia, January 6, 1947, and was buried in Dalton.

== Selected works ==
- Biographies of representative women of the South

== See also ==
- Southern United States literature
