= The 4% Solution =

2012 non-fiction book

The 4% Solution: Unleashing the Economic Growth America Needs
- Authors: George W. Bush; James K. Glassman; Brendan Miniter; W. Michael Cox; Richard Alm; Robert Lucas, Jr. Edward C. Prescott; Steven Gjerstad; Vernon L. Smith; Kevin Hassett; David Malpass; Myron Scholes; Peter G. Klein; Robert Litan; Nick Schulz; Maria Minniti; Carlos Gutierrez; Steven F. Hayward; Kenneth P. Green; Charles Blahous; Jason J. Fichtner; Eric Hanushek; Gary Becker; Pia M. Orrenius; Madeline Zavodny; E. Floyd Kvamme; Amity Shlaes; Michael Novak
- Language: English
- Publisher: Crown Business
- Publication date: July 17, 2012

The 4% Solution: Unleashing the Economic Growth America Needs is a 2012 non-fiction book. Alongside a foreword by President George W. Bush, it features articles from academics and businesspeople, including five winners of the Nobel Memorial Prize in Economic Sciences.

== Background ==
The 4% Solution was published by Crown Business and edited by Brendan Miniter. It was the first book produced by the George W. Bush Institute, a think tank located at the George W. Bush Presidential Center on the campus of Southern Methodist University (SMU) in Dallas, Texas. The foreword is written by George W. Bush, who served as the 43rd President of the United States from 2001 to 2009. At the end of his presidency, the nation was headed into the Great Recession due to a downturn in the economy and the 2008 financial crisis.

The idea for the book was originally conceived as part of the 4% Growth Project at the Bush Institute, which called for setting sustained annual 4% gross domestic product (GDP) growth as a target for national policy makers. A 4% growth rate would be significantly higher than growth rate the nation experienced during the period between the end of World War II and the Great Recession that began in 2008. The average growth rate for that period is approximately 3%.

As part of the 4% Growth Project, the Bush Institute held an economic conference on the campus of SMU in May 2011, where leading economists (including Ed Prescott and Robert Lucas) offered ideas on how to spark significant economic growth in the United States. Following the conference, the Bush Institute decided to produce a book offering specific ideas on how to grow the economy at an accelerated rate. To produce the book, essays were commissioned from several economists who attended the May conference at SMU and from other leading thinkers. The book is built on the premise that significant economic growth is possible even in the highly-developed economy of the United States. The book is also built on the belief that a free-market approach of lower taxes and less government regulation can help foster such growth. The book was published on July 17, 2012.

== Promotional efforts ==
On July 17, 2012, President Bush presented the book at the Parkland Memorial Hospital in Dallas, Texas. Following President Bush's remarks at Parkland, Brendan Miniter (the editor of the book and an author of a chapter) and Jason J. Fichtner and Kevin A. Hassett (both chapter authors) gave remarks about the content of the book. The discussion was moderated by James K. Glassman, then executive director of the George W. Bush Institute. The presentation was broadcast five times on Book TV from August to December 2012.

It was presented by Amity Shlaes and Brendan Miniter at the Harvard Club of New York. Moreover, the Philadelphia Media Network published an excerpt by Brendan Miniter. It was also promoted by George W. Bush's brother, Jeb Bush, who served as the governor of Florida from 1999 to 2007. He suggested the book should be used by then presidential candidate Mitt Romney to offer a bold vision for leadership and win the election, instead of simply criticizing President Barack Obama's policies.

== Content ==
The book contains essays by academics and businesspeople, five of which are Nobel Prize-winning economists: Robert Lucas, Gary Becker, Edward Prescott, Vernon Smith and Myron Scholes.

The book features chapters on education, energy, immigration, monetary, regulatory, and tax policy as well as other issues. There is also a chapter on the housing industry by Vernon Smith and Steve Gjerstad that offers new research into the role housing plays in predicting the direction of the national economy.

The target of sustained 4% annual GDP growth is not universally accepted among economists. Even some of the authors of chapters in The 4% Solution disagree that such an accelerated growth rate is possible on a sustained basis in the United States. Robert E. Lucas, Jr., for example, is noted in an introductory chapter as being skeptical that such a growth rate is sustainable in the U.S.

His caution is particularly noteworthy because he was a leading economic growth theorist. He also wrote a paper for the Federal Reserve Bank of Minneapolis in 2004 that considered economic growth rates throughout history and calculated that global economic growth rates were stagnant at 1% before the industrial revolution and have accelerated in the centuries since to reach around 4% globally. As noted in the book, global growth of 4% is possible because several countries, such as China, can grow at a much faster rate as they "catch up" to more industrialized nations, while its hard for those nations already industrialized to grow at such a rate for a sustained period of time.

According to a review published in The New York Times, "The ideas in the book include lowering corporate tax rates, shifting away from taxing income to taxing consumption and property, promoting innovation by letting professors keep gains from their research, expanding free-trade pacts with Japan and other countries, refocusing immigration policy to recruit more high-skill workers, and expanding the work force by lowering payroll taxes on employees with children."

== Critical reception ==
In The Daily Beast, Paul Begala wrote that Bush was "right to focus on growth", adding "Growth is the secret sauce." The Asia Times "agree[d] with the authors of the Bush Institute volume that the entrepreneurial engine can be jump-started" as opposing to "derid[ing]" entrepreneurship "as in Obama's now infamous 'You didn't build that!' gaffe". However, they suggested the book's solutions were "like Pascal's wager". Adding that "economics is more like medicine than rocket science", they suggested that those solutions would have to be tested to know if they would lead to positive results. They concluded that should those solutions not be applied immediately (in 2012), "the medicine may no longer work" four years later (in 2016).
