= Margaret O'Connor Wilson =

American civic leader (1856–1942)

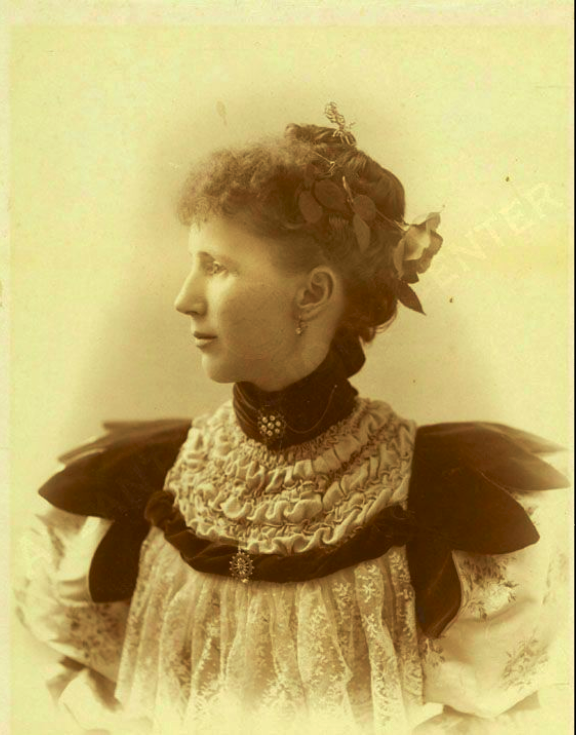
- Wilson circa 1880

President General of the Confederated Southern Memorial Association

Personal details
- Born: Margaret O'Connor; 1856 Gainesville, Georgia, U.S.
- Died: August 19, 1942 (aged 85–86) Atlanta, Georgia, U.S.
- Spouse: Arthur McDermott Wilson
- Children: 2
- Occupation: philanthropist

Margaret O'Connor Wilson (née O'Connor; also known as Mrs. A. McD. Wilson; 1856–1942) was an American civic leader and philanthropist. Prominent in civic and patriotic organizations in Atlanta for many years, she was also known for her religious and philanthropic work. Among the many positions that she held, Wilson served as President General of the Confederated Southern Memorial Association (CSMA).

== Early life and education ==
Margaret (nickname "Maggie") Adeline O'Connor was born in Gainesville, Hall County, Georgia, in 1856. She was the daughter of Elizabeth Pettigrew Thompson and Patrick O’Connor. She was descended on her mother's side from colonial and Revolutionary ancestry which included the families of Thompson, Wade, Gibbs and Weeks of Virginia, and on her father's side from Roderick O’Connor, the last High King of Ireland. Her father, Lieutenant O’Connor, under the command of General Lucius J. Gartrell in the Confederate States Army, was one of five sons who died fighting for the Confederacy during the American Civil War, and one uncle, Captain James O’Connor, filled an unknown grave in the cemetery at Camp Chase, Ohio, victim to prison life. Dr. William Thompson, an uncle, served as surgeon major for two years with the Arkansas troops.

In 1862, her family removed to Atlanta, Georgia where she subsequently resided. Her earliest recollections center around the civil war period when, as a child, she made lint for the wounded soldiers by unraveling old linen, and going to the hospital trains with her mother to carry soup and delicacies to the sick and wounded soldiers. When the order came from General William Tecumseh Sherman for the women and children to leave Atlanta, as he would shell and burn the town, with her mother and two little sisters in one end of a boxcar, and the African Americans they enslaved in the other, they fled. One month was occupied in being transported the 175 miles (282 km) to Augusta, Georgia, where the family remained until Sherman had completed his destructive work.

Wilson was educated in the private schools of Atlanta, and finished at the Young Ladies’ Seminary under Professor and Mrs. Hale.

== Career ==
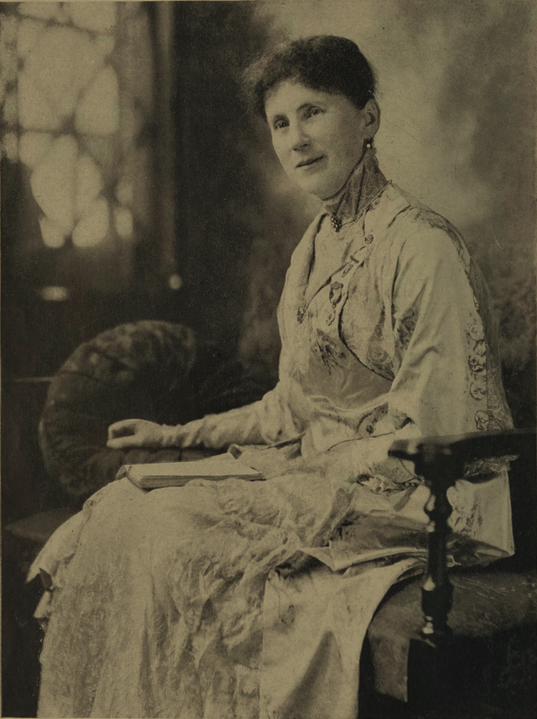
Wilson ca. 1920

Mrs. Wilson's interest in Confederate Memorial Day exercises began when as a child she assisted in making wreaths to decorate graves, and later became a member of the Ladies' Memorial Association, and a United Daughters of the Confederacy (UDC). She was president of the Atlanta Chapter of the UDC, and served a term of four years as vice president for the Georgia Division of UDC. For four years, she held the office of State Vice President of the CSMA. Her election to the high office of President General to the CSMA came as a fitting conclusion to her years of devotion to the sentiments and traditions of the South.

Wilson rendered valuable service in organizing the first conference held by the Georgia Division of Children of the Confederacy (Cof), and was honored by having the largest chapter of CofC in the South named for her, the Margaret A, Wilson Chapter, of Atlanta. Through her efforts as State Chair for the UDC, the money was raised for the Georgia window in the Blandford Church at Petersburg, Virginia , and she assisted Dorothy Blount Lamar, then State President of the UDC, in unveiling the window. By appointment of State President, Mrs. Wilson with four other women, was selected to decide on the location of the Winnie Davis Memorial, which was given to Athens, Georgia.

After having filled many offices in the Atlanta Chapter Daughters of the American Revolution (DAR), she was elected Regent of the Atlanta Chapter, served two terms, and later served terms as State Recording Secretary, and State Historian to the Georgia Society DAR.

Nonetheless, important was her philanthropic and civic work. Under Wilson's guidance, the YWCA had its first success. For 12 years, she held the office of President of the Gulf States, which included Georgia, Florida, Alabama, Louisiana, and Mississippi. For two years, she was a member of the American Committee of the YWCA, and she was one of 30 women called to New York City from various large cities for the organization of the National Board, being a charter member of the National Board and for four years, a member of the National Board of the YWCA. Under her leadership was organized the Atlanta YWCA, and she was its first active President and is Honorary President for life.

For four years, Wilson was president of the Florence Crittenton Home. She was elected to the Presidency of the City Federation of Woman's Clubs, an organization of over 8,000 club women. She also served two years as President of the Atlanta Woman's Club. She was the first First Vice President of the Atlanta Woman's Pioneer Society and a charter member. She was an honorary member of the Atlanta Writers' Club.

It was through her leadership that the Joel Chandler Harris House was saved as a memorial. Wilson was president of the Uncle Remus Memorial Association since its organization, and was elected president for life to that organization. It was through her initiative that President Theodore Roosevelt came to Atlanta to lecture on "Joel Chandler Harris", for the memorial fund to preserve the "Wrens Nest" (Joel Chandler Harris House), the home of Mr. Harris, that she was hostess to Mr. Roosevelt in her home.

A distinguished compliment was the election of Wilson to membership in the Old Guard, the oldest military organization in Atlanta, her election having taken place in 1919. Among other notable offices held was that of Vice President to the Ladies’ Auxiliary of Grady Memorial Hospital, and she assisted in making possible the children's ward in that institution. She was also First Vice President of the Atlanta Child's Home and a member of the advisory board.

== Personal life ==
On December 14, 1875, she married Arthur McDermott Wilson, a prominent financier and businessman of Atlanta. Their children were Arthur McDermott Wilson Jr. and Willie O'Connor Wilson (died young).

Wilson was cultured, widely traveled, both in Europe and the U.S., and divided her time between her country home, Ballyclare Lodge, and her town home. She had the social graces befitting her position, and her home included many social gatherings. Her recreations included motoring and travel. In religion, she was an Episcopalian.

Margaret O'Connor Wilson died August 19, 1942, in Atlanta, Georgia.
