= Scotty Probasco =

American heir, businessman and philanthropist

- Born: November 26, 1928; Chattanooga, Tennessee
- Died: April 17, 2015 (aged 86); Chattanooga, Tennessee
- Education: Baylor School; Dartmouth College; Wharton School of the University of Pennsylvania
- Occupations: Businessman; Philanthropist
- Spouse: Betty Rowland Probasco
- Children: 4

Scott Livingston Probasco, Jr. (November 26, 1928 – April 17, 2015) was an American heir, businessman and philanthropist.

== Early life ==
Scotty Probasco was born in Chattanooga, Tennessee on November 26, 1928. His family has been involved in banking for ten generations. His grandfather, Harry Scott Probasco (1858-1919), founded the American National Bank, and his father, Scott L. Probasco, Sr. (1890-1962), founded a trust company ultimately bought by SunTrust Banks.

Probasco attended the Baylor School, where he played on the golf team. He received a Bachelor of Arts degree in history from Dartmouth College and attended the Wharton School of the University of Pennsylvania.

== Career ==
Probasco considered becoming a preacher, but joined the family business instead. He served as the chair of the Executive Committee of SunTrust Bank in Chattanooga. He served on the Board of Directors as well as the Audit and Compensation Committees of Chattem, a Chattanooga-based producer and marketer of over-the-counter healthcare products, toiletries, dietary supplements, topical analgesics, and medicated skin care products.

== Philanthropy ==
Probasco sat on the Board of Trustees of the University of Tennessee at Chattanooga as well as its UTC Alumni Council, UT Development Council, and UT Foundation. He has also supported the UT chapter of the Fellowship of Christian Athletes. The Probasco Chair of Free Enterprise at UTC, was originally endowed by Burkett Miller, Managing Partner of Miller and Martin and Probasco's good friend. Miller named the Chair for Probasco to honor his commitment to the enduring values of American Free Enterprise. The Chair was held by Jeff Ray Clark until 2019, Claudia Williamson, Ph.D. was appointed to the Chair in the summer of 2020. He received the UTC Alumni Board's Outstanding Service Award.

Probasco also donated to the Baylor School, the Chattanooga Chamber of Commerce, the Chattanooga-based Benwood Foundation, Bethel Bible Village, a crisis center for neglected, abused and in-crisis children based in Hixson, Tennessee, the Community Foundation of Greater Chattanooga, and the United Way of Greater Chattanooga. He supported Republican Bill Haslam's gubernatorial campaign in 2010.

== Personal life and death ==
Probasco was married to Betty Rowland Probasco, a.k.a. Betty Probasco, they resided in Lookout Mountain, Tennessee, a suburb of Chattanooga. They met at the Chattanooga Golf and Country Club in 1953. His wife was an avid golfer and a former executive at the Women's Southern Golf Association. They had four children:

- Zane Probasco Brown. She is married to Greg Brown, who was elected as the Mayor of Lookout Mountain, Tennessee in 2006. He was still the Mayor in 2012.
- Ellen Probasco Moore.
- Benjamin Rowland Probasco. He has served on the Board of Directors of Krystal, a fast food restaurant chain, since 1997.
- Scott Probasco, III.

Probasco's sister, Alice Probasco, was married to the late John T. Lupton II, the heir to the JTL Corporation, Coca-Cola's largest bottler until he sold it to the Coca-Cola Enterprises for US$1.4 billion in 1986. Scotty Probasco was known for wearing bowties and smoking Honduran cigars. He died on April 17, 2015.
