= Association of Private Enterprise Education =

United States organization

The Association of Private Enterprise Education is a nonprofit organization founded by a philanthropic donation from Herman Lay, co-founder of Frito-Lay, a subsidiary of PepsiCo. It was created for the purpose of "studying and supporting the system of private enterprise" and aims "to put into action accurate and objective understandings of private enterprise".

It holds an annual conference and publishes the Journal of Private Enterprise. It also recognizes, by means of a number of awards, persons of distinction who have helped to further its aims.

== Former presidents ==
- Edward Stringham
- Benjamin Powell
- Jeff Ray Clark
- Bruce L. Benson
- Michael Cox
- Bruce Yandle
- Jane Shaw
- Gordon Tullock
