= Confederated Southern Memorial Association =

- Confederated Southern Memorial Association (U.S.)
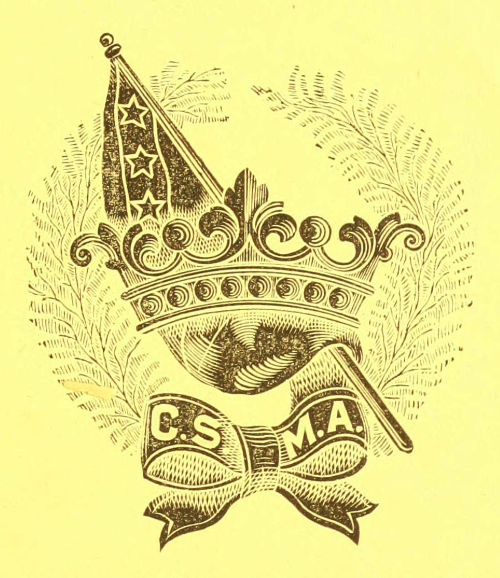
- Abbreviation: CSMA
- Formation: May 30, 1900
- Founded at: Louisville, Kentucky, on
- Type: Nonprofit
- Origins: Ladies' Memorial Associations
- Region served: Southern United States
- Fields: Neo-Confederate organization that unified state and regional associations
- Affiliations: United Confederate Veterans

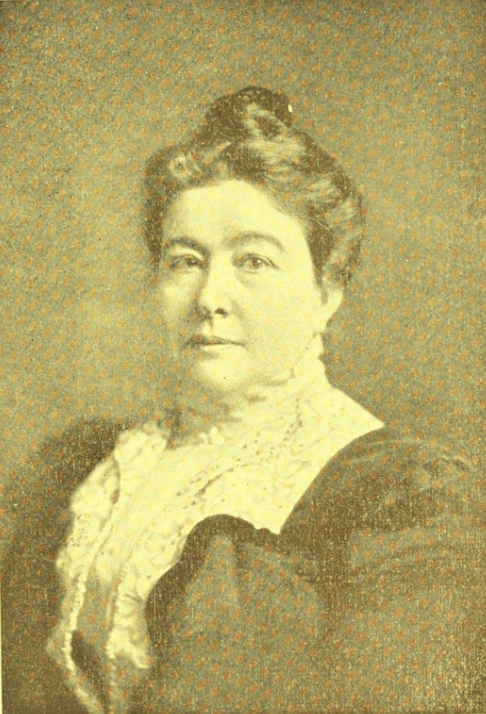
Kate Walker Behan, president general, CSMA

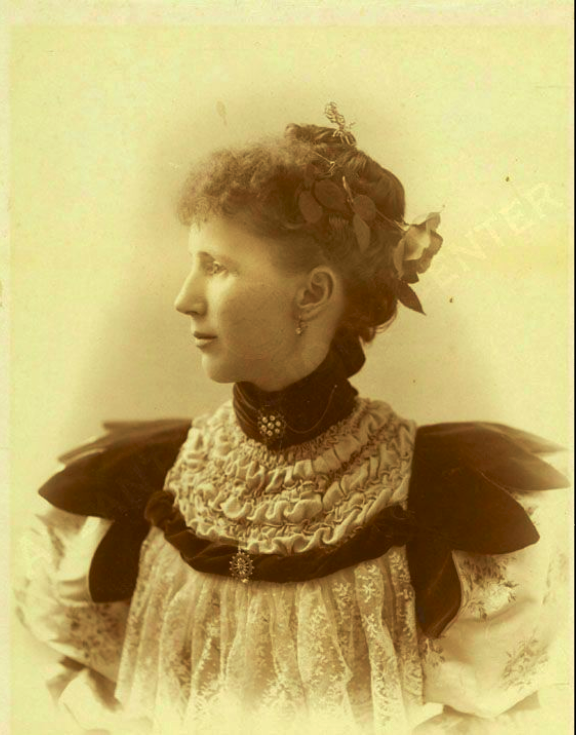
Margaret O'Connor Wilson, president general, CSMA

Confederated Southern Memorial Association (Confederated Southern Memorial Association (U.S.); acronym CSMA; est. 1900) was a Neo-Confederate women's organization of unified memorial associations of the Southern United States. It was composed of 70 women's memorial associations, which had formed between 1861 and 1900. The CSMA was established at Louisville, Kentucky, on May 30, 1900. At that meeting, the women stated that they were unwilling to lose their identity as memorial associations, or to merge themselves into the United Daughters of the Confederacy. Instead, by this union of all Memorial Associations, it was believed that the women of the South would perpetuate more certainly the purposes for which each association had been individually laboring, and would more firmly cement the ties which already existed between them. An increase in membership and more intelligent knowledge of the history of the Confederate Cause would also be the natural result of annual meetings.

== History ==
=== Ladies' Memorial Associations (1861-1900) ===
Some Ladies' Memorial Associations were formed as far back as 1861. For example, Mary Amarinthia Snowden founded the Soldiers Relief Association of Charleston, the Ladies Memorial Association of Charleston, and the Home for the Mothers, Widows, and Daughters of Confederate Soldiers.

=== CSMA establishment (1900) ===
Early in the spring of 1900, at a regular monthly meeting of the Southern Memorial Association of Fayetteville, Arkansas, on motion of Miss Julia A. Garside (later Mrs. W. B. Welch), it was decided to endeavor to organize all Memorial Associations of the South into a general federation, the object being to commemorate the work already done and to insure its continuance. The Corresponding Secretary was instructed to write to associations elsewhere and ask their cooperation. Cordial responses were received and arrangements made for delegates from each association to meet at the United Confederate Veterans (UCV) Reunion at Louisville, Kentucky.

A meeting was held at the Galt House, May 30, 1900, at which time, the organization was established, delegates from thirteen associations being present. The following officers were elected for a term of three years: President, Kate Walker Behan (Mrs. W. J. Behan), of White Castle, La.; Recording Secretary, Miss Daisy M. L. Hodgson, New Orleans, La.; Corresponding Secretary, Miss Sue H. Walker, Fayetteville, Ark.; Historian, Mrs. Sarah Polk Blake, and a Vice President from each, of the States represented. A Committee on Constitution and By-Laws was appointed. At a subsequent meeting the same was submitted and adopted. The Constitution provided that this organization would be called "The Confederated Southern Memorial Association", and that its object would be, "Strictly Memorial and Historical".

== Work ==
The work of the Association was memorial and monumental. The care of the graves of the Confederate dead and the erection of monuments to their memory was the special trust of the Association. As the veteran women of the Association died, younger women joined the ranks to continue the work begun by their female members. Those who joined later were just as enthusiastic and eager to take up the work as those who had been engaged in it for years.

In addition to the general work of the Confederation, the Associations gave evidence of renewed interest in local work by increased membership, regular meetings, and interesting programs for Memorial Day exercises.

=== Publications ===
An important undertaking of the CSMA was the collection and compilation of the histories of all the memorial associations, to preserve them in book form. A copy of this book, History of the Confederated Memorial Associations of the South, would be placed in all the Confederate Museums and principal libraries.

== Notable members ==
- Kate Walker Behan, president, CSMA
- Virginia Frazer Boyle, poet laureate, CSMA
- Margaret Wootten Collier, official biographer, CSMA
- Margaret O'Connor Wilson, president general, CSMA

== Associations enrolled in the CSMA ==
- Southern Memorial Association — Fayetteville, Arkansas
- Ladies' Memorial Association — Montgomery, Alabama
- Ladies' Memorial Association — Camden, Alabama
- Ladies' Memorial Association' — Gainesville, Alabama
- Southern Ladies' Memorial Association — Florence, Alabama.
- Ladies Memorial Association — Boligee, Alabama.
- Union Springs Memorial Association — Union Springs, Alabama
- White House of the Confederacy — Montgomery, Alabama
- Ladies' Memorial Association — Pensacola, Florida
- Ladies' Memorial Association — Quincy, Florida
- Ladies' Memorial Association — Atlanta, Georgia
- Ladies' Memorial Association — Augusta, Georgia
- Ladies' Memorial Association — Columbus, Georgia
- Ladies' Memorial Association — Marietta, Georgia
- Ladies' Memorial Association — Waynesboro, Georgia
- Ladies' Memorial Association — Albany, Georgia
- Ladies' Memorial Association — Athens, Georgia
- Washington Memorial Association — Washington, Georgia
- Ladies' Memorial Association — Resaca, Georgia
- Ladies' Memorial Association — Brunswick, Georgia
- Ladies' Memorial Association Morgan County — Madison Georgia
- Ladies' Memorial Association — Rome, Georgia
- Hancock Ladies' Memorial Association — Sparta, Georgia
- Sandersville Memorial Association — Sandersville, Georgia
- Americus Memorial Association — Americus, Georgia
- The Ladies' Memorial Association — Thomson, Georgia
- The Eliza Easlon Shannon Memorial Association — View, Kentucky
- Ladies' Confederate Memorial Association — New Orleans, Louisiana
- Junior Confederate Memorial Association — New Orleans, Louisiana
- Jefferson Davis Monument Association — New Orleans, Louisiana
- Confederate Memorial Association — Baton Rouge, Louisiana
- Confederate Cemetery Memorial Association — Vicksburg, Mississippi
- Beauvoir Memorial Association — Greenwood, Mississippi
- Jefferson Davis Home Memorial Association — Biloxi, Mississippi
- Ladies' Memorial Association — Natchez, Mississippi
- Confederate Memorial and Literary Society — St. Louis, Missouri
- Sterling Price Memorial Association — Jefferson City, Missouri
- State Monument Association — Springfield, Missouri
- Blandford Memorial Association — Mexico, Missouri
- Samuel S. Harris Memorial Association — Cape Girardeau, Missouri
- Ladies' Memorial Association — Nevada, Missouri
- Ladies' Memorial Association — Raleigh, North Carolina
- Beaufort County Memorial Association — Washington, North Carolina
- Ladies' Memorial Association — Fort Mill, South Carolina
- Ladies' Confederate Memorial Association — Charleston, South Carolina
- Ladies' Memorial Association — Knoxville Tennessee
- Ladies' Memorial Association — Memphis, Tennessee
- Southern Mothers — Memphis, Tennessee
- Sul Boss Memorial Association — Waco, Texas
- Confederate Memorial and Literary Society — Richmond, Virginia
- Hollywood Memorial Association — Richmond, Virginia
- Junior Hollywood Memorial Association — Richmond, Virginia
- Oakwood Memorial Association— Richmond, Virginia.
- Junior Oakwood Memorial Association— Richmond, Virginia.
- The Warren Memorial Association — Front Royal, Virginia
- Ladies' Memorial Association— Petersburg, Virginia
- Manassas Memorial Association— Manassas, Virginia
- Lynchburg Memorial Association — Lynchburg, Virginia
- Ladies' Memorial Association — Danville, Virginia
- Memorial Aid Association — Portsmouth, Virginia
- New Market Memorial Association — Lexington, Virginia
- Ladies Memorial Association — Winchester, Virginia

== History of the confederated memorial associations of the South (1904) ==
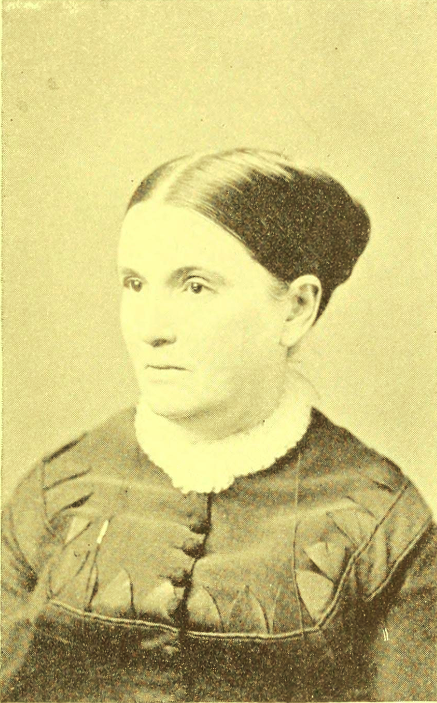
Alice Whiting Waterman

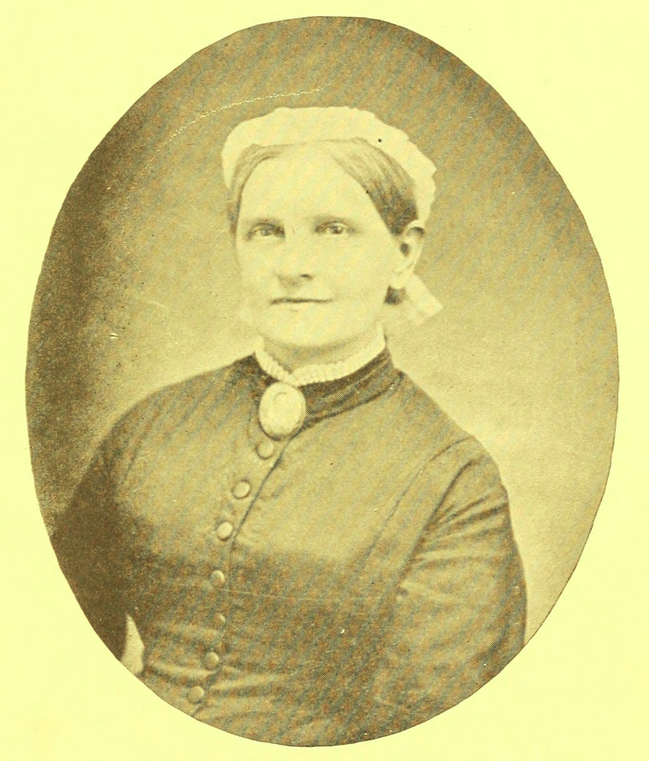
Amarintha Snowden

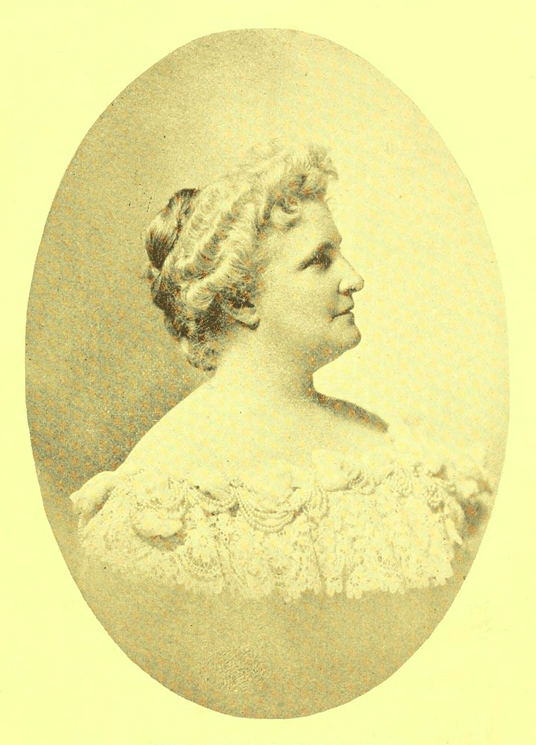
Annie Foster Leonard Garrard

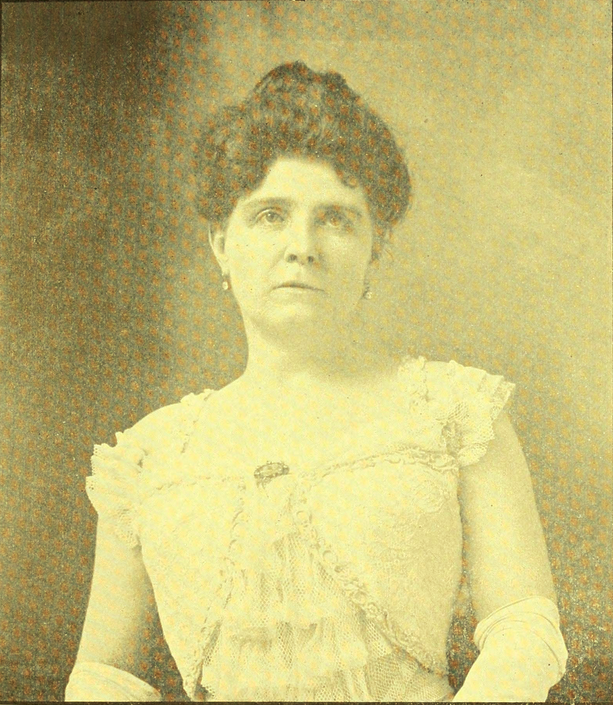
Caroline Blount Phelan Beale

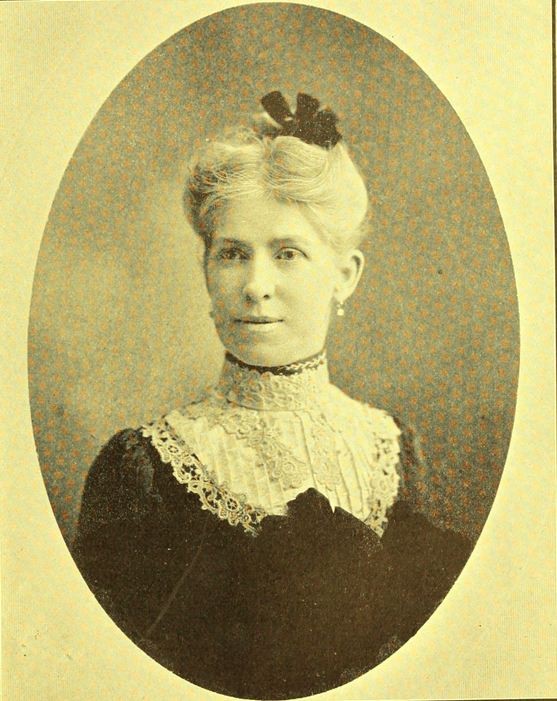
Daisy M. L. Hodgson

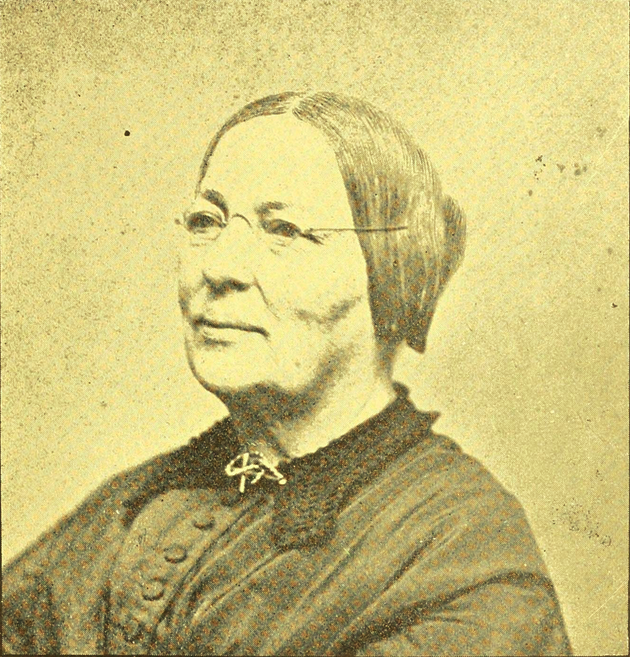
Eliza Bilisoly

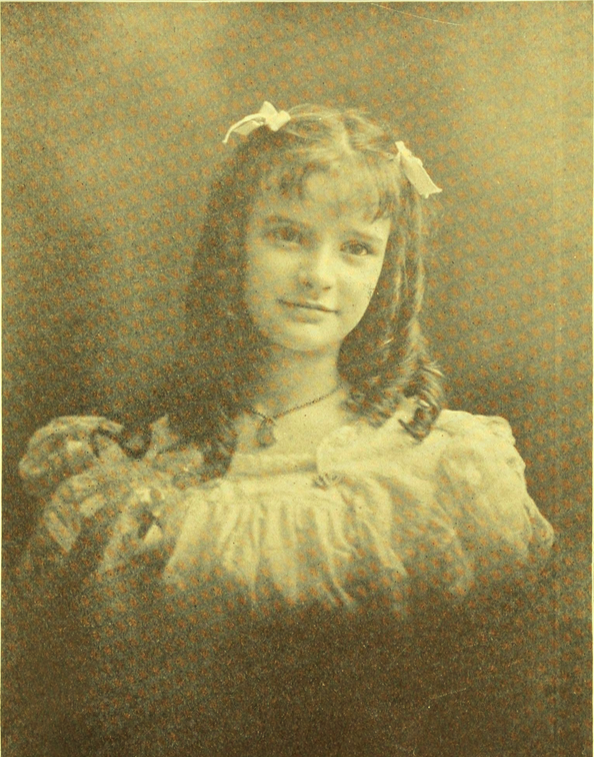
Estelle M. Hodgson

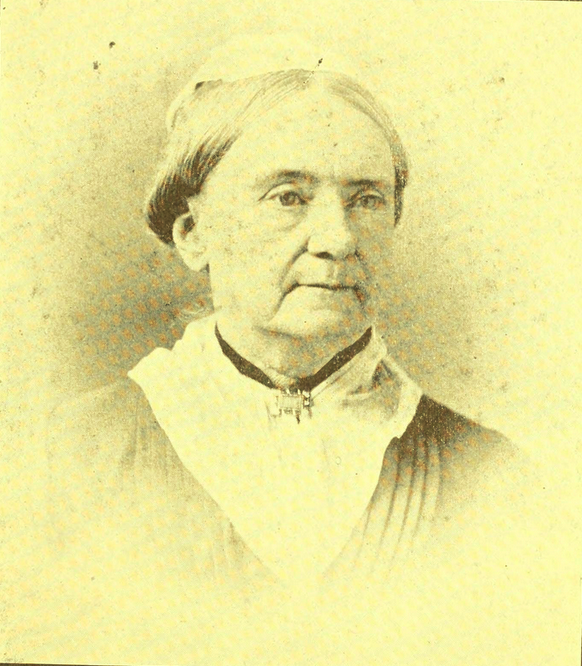
Evelyn Carter

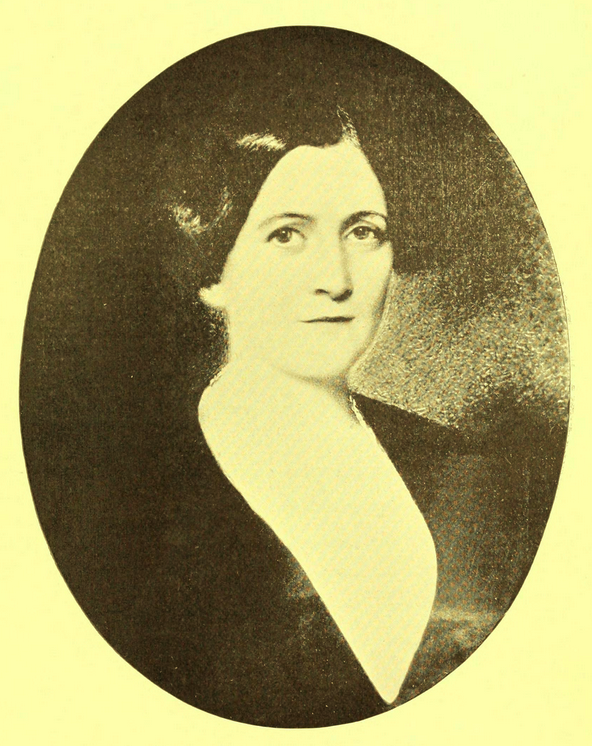
Fannie Barker Galloway

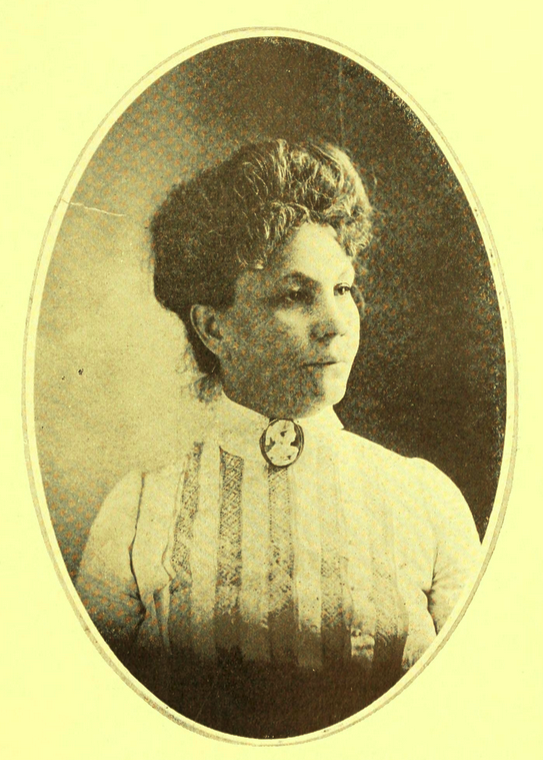
Julia Garside Welch

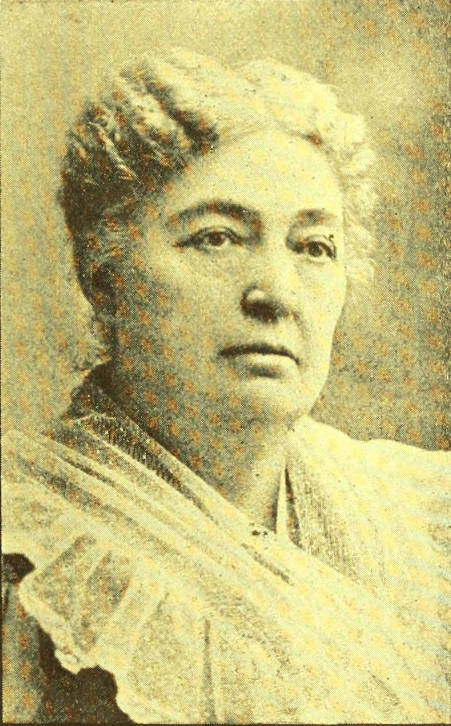
Lizzie Pollard

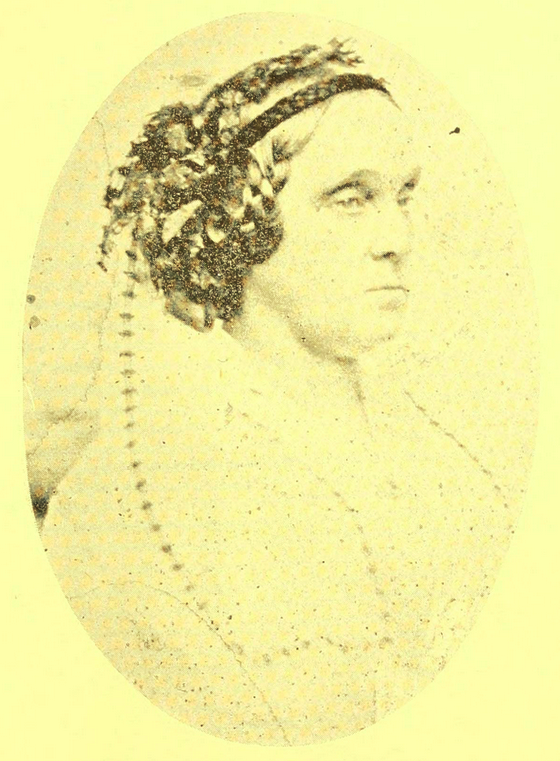
Lucy Mina Otey

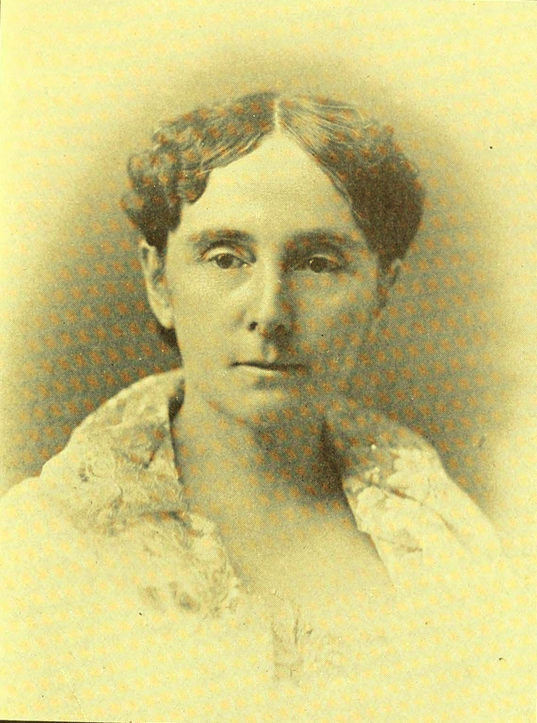
Lucy Norvell Otey

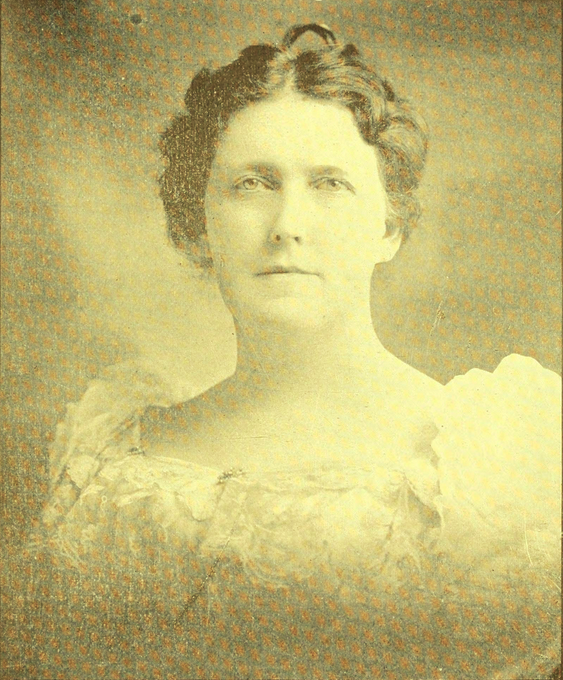
M. Louise Benton Garner-Graham

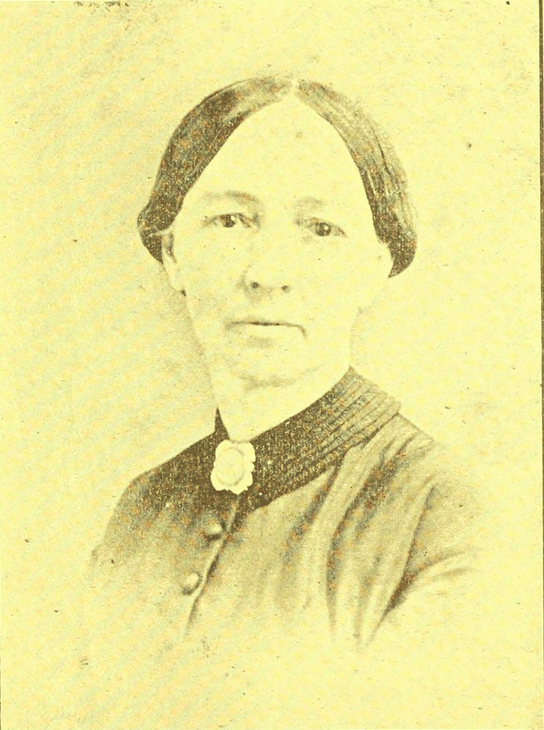
Mary Ann Williams

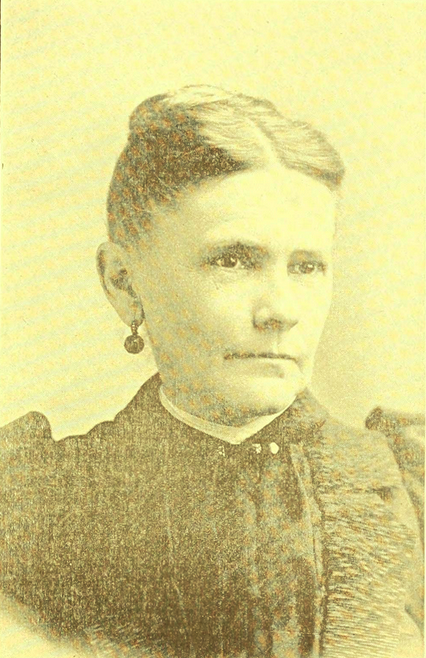
Mrs. C. A. Rowland

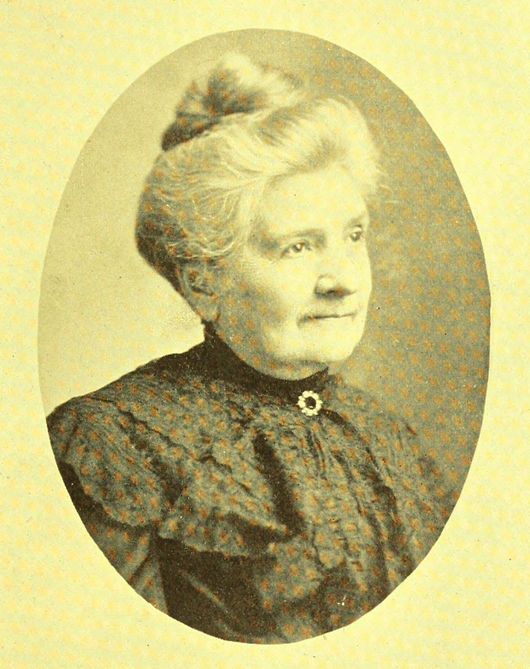
Mrs. F. A. Timberlake

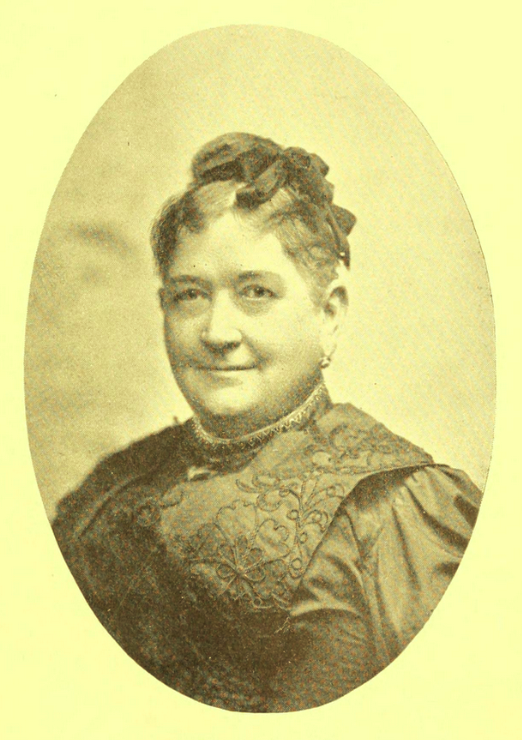
Mrs. J. C. Lee

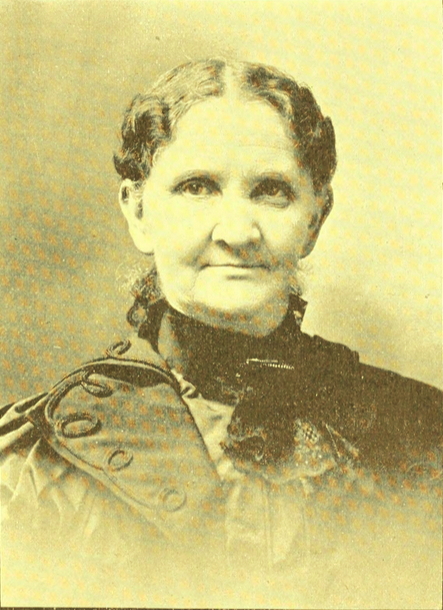
Mrs. J. D. Walker

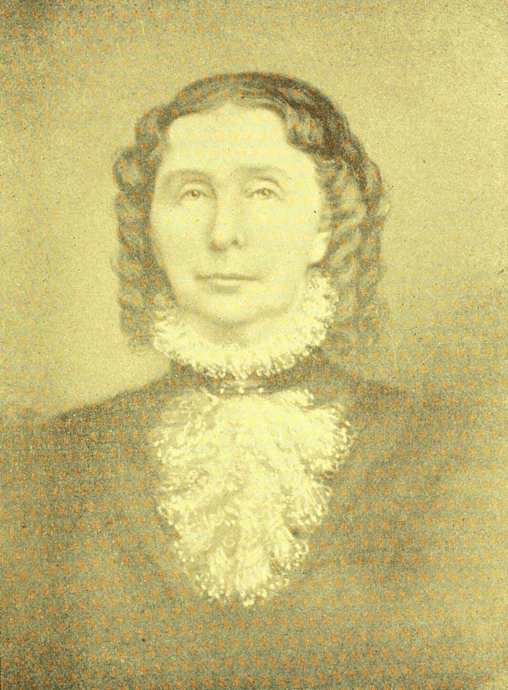
Sophie Gilmer Bibb

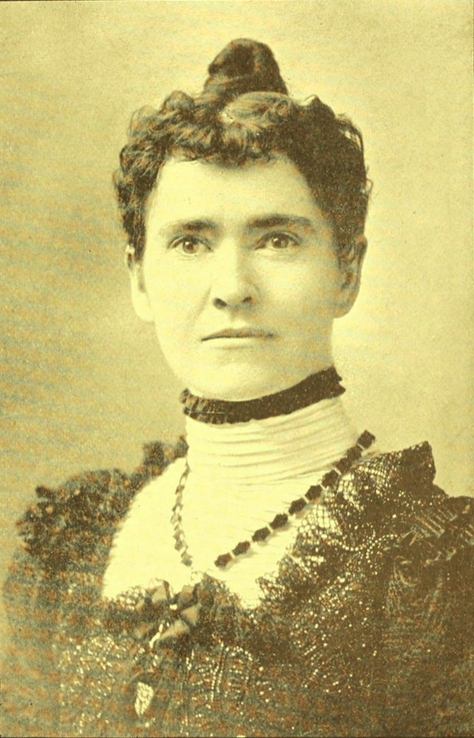
Sue H. Walker

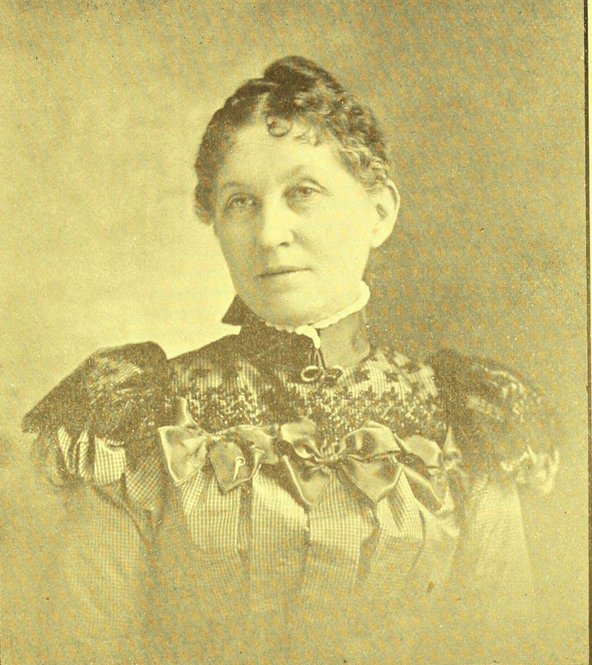
Theodosia Taylor Worthington Valliant

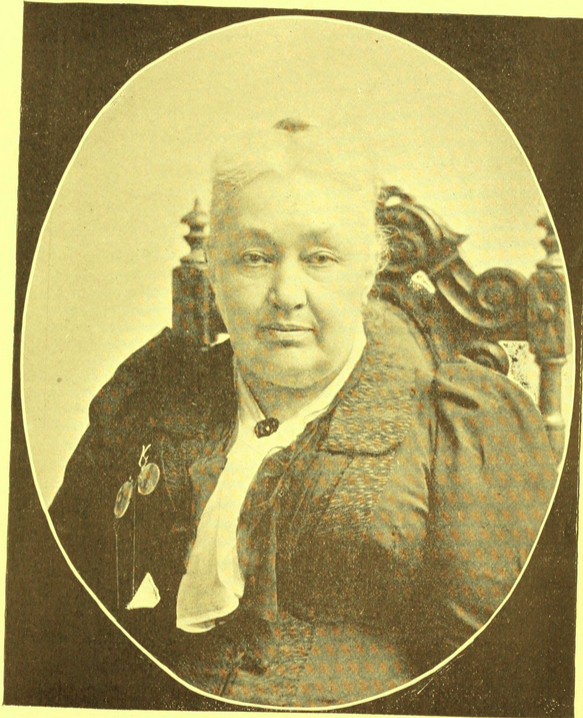
Varina Davis
