= Alex Nowrasteh =

American economist and policy analyst

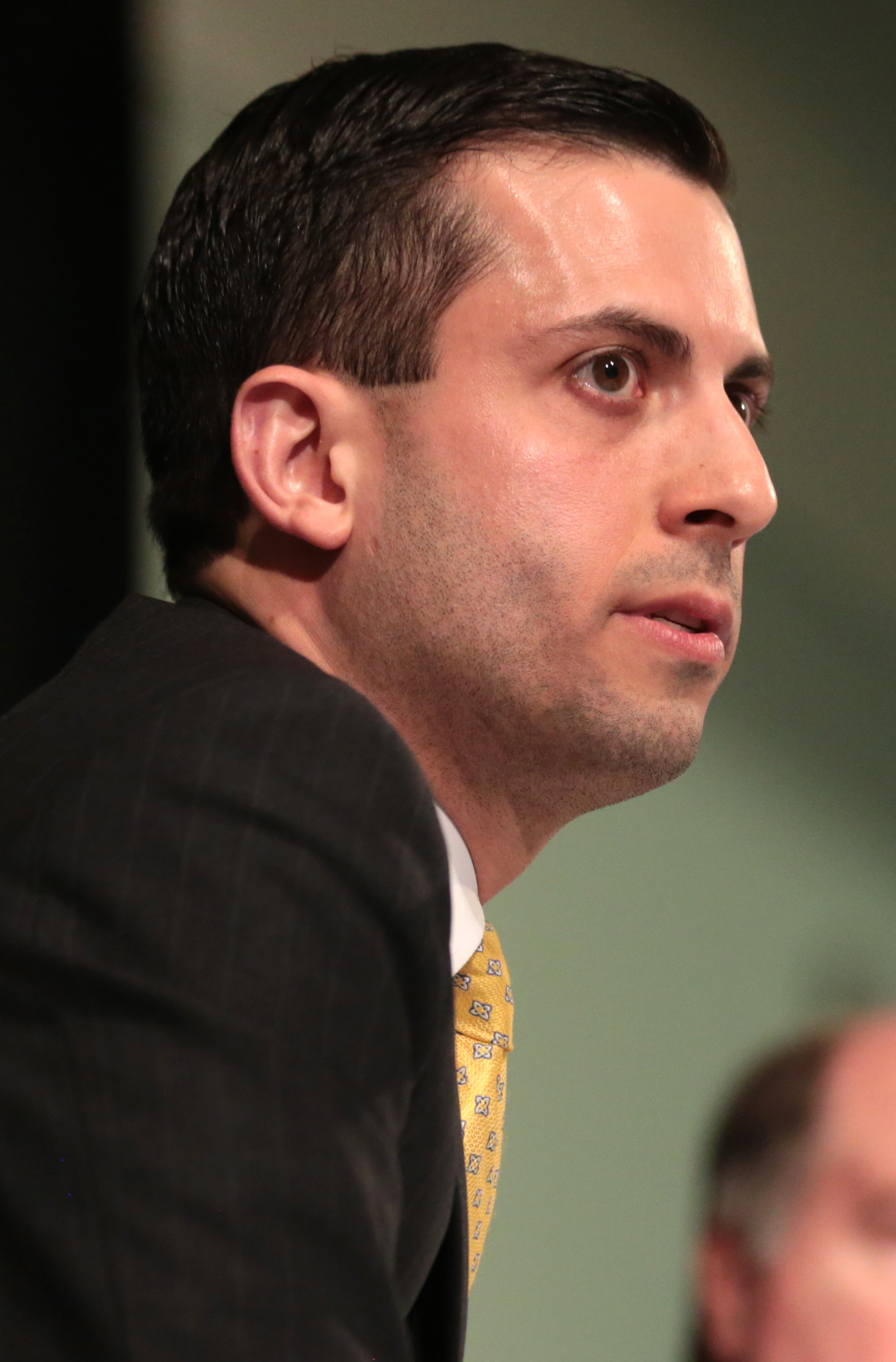
- Nowrasteh in 2017
- Born: Alexander Nowrasteh; California, U.S.
- Education: George Mason University (BA); London School of Economics (MSc)
- Occupation: Immigration policy analyst
- Board member of: Center for Global Liberty and Prosperity of the Cato Institute

Alexander Nowrasteh is an American analyst of immigration policy currently working at the Cato Institute, a libertarian think tank located in Washington, D.C. Nowrasteh is an advocate of freer migration to the United States. He previously worked as the immigration policy analyst at the Competitive Enterprise Institute, another libertarian think tank. Nowrasteh is a self-described "radical" advocate for open borders to and from the United States. He has published a number of peer-reviewed studies on immigration and co-authored with Benjamin Powell the book Wretched Refuse?: The Political Economy of Immigration and Institutions.

In January 2013, ABC News listed Nowrasteh as #15 on a list of top 20 immigration experts to follow on Twitter in the United States. In July 2013, The National Journal magazine ran a feature in its print edition about Nowrasteh entitled "The Libertarian Case," that featured an interview and discussion of immigration. He has faced criticism from conservatives for his views on immigration and other topics.

== Early life and education ==
Alex Nowrasteh was born and raised in Southern California to Iranian-American filmmaker Cyrus Nowrasteh and his wife Betsy Giffen Nowrasteh. Alex completed a B.A. in economics from George Mason University and a M.Sc. in economic history from the London School of Economics where he authored a dissertation about the economics of counter-insurgency strategy.

== Publications ==
=== Publications related to immigration ===
In April 2013, Nowrasteh wrote a blog post critical of a 2007 study conducted by Robert Rector and published by The Heritage Foundation that attempted to estimate the long-term fiscal impact of various immigration policies. It delayed the release of Heritage's updated study and placed it under severe scrutiny by academics and other policy analysts – substantially diminishing its influence. On the day of the publication of the Heritage report (May 6, 2013), Nowrasteh participated in a press call strongly critiquing the study, along with people from Americans for Tax Reform, the Kemp Foundation, and the American Action Network.

On September 13, 2016, the Cato Institute published a policy analysis by Nowrasteh on "Terrorism and Immigration: A Risk Analysis." He notes that, "Terrorism is a hazard to human life and material prosperity that should be addressed in a sensible manner whereby the benefits of actions to contain it outweigh the costs. ... [T]he chance of an American perishing in a terrorist attack on U.S. soil that was committed by a foreigner over the 41-year period studied here is 1 in 3.6 million per year. The hazard posed by foreigners who entered on different visa categories varies considerably. For instance, the chance of an American being murdered in a terrorist attack caused by a refugee is 1 in 3.64 billion per year while the chance of being murdered in an attack committed by an illegal immigrant is an astronomical 1 in 10.9 billion per year. By contrast, the chance of being murdered by a tourist on a B visa, the most common tourist visa, is 1 in 3.9 million per year. Any government response to terrorism must take account of the wide range of hazards posed by foreign-born terrorists who entered under various visa categories."

Nowrasteh (along with Michelangelo Landgrave) used a residual statistical technique to estimate the number of illegal immigrants who are incarcerated in a Cato report entitled "Criminal Immigrants: Their Numbers, Demographics, and Countries of Origin." Their main finding was that "[t]he incarceration rate was 1.53 percent for natives, 0.85 percent for illegal immigrants, and 0.47 percent for legal immigrants."

Nowrasteh's academic research largely focuses on how immigrants could affect the economic institutions in destination countries. A paper by Nowrasteh on the subject in collaboration with George Mason University doctoral student Zachary Gochenour found that immigration to the United States appeared to have not had a significant impact on the welfare state viewed in either per capita or aggregate terms. The authors summarized their findings and the policy implications in an op-ed for Investors Business Daily. Ilya Somin discussed the policy implications of the research in an article for The Washington Post''. In May 2014, the Cato Institute published a working paper co-authored by Nowrasteh (along with J. R. Clark, Robert Lawson, Benjamin Powell, and Ryan Murphy) on the impact of immigration on institutions. The paper was later published by the journal Public Choice in April 2015. Nowrasteh (along with J.R. Clark, and Benjamin Powell) also authored "Does mass immigration destroy institutions? 1990s Israel as a natural experiment" in the Journal of Economic Behavior and Organization. In 2019, Nowrasteh published another study in the Journal of Economic Behavior & Organization which concluded that there was "no relationship between immigration and terrorism, whether measured by the number of attacks or victims, in destination countries... These results hold for immigrants from both Muslim majority and conflict-torn countries of origin."

=== Other publications ===
Nowrasteh has co-authored two academic papers that appeared in the Journal of Economic Behavior & Organization. The first with Benjamin Powell and Ryan Ford was an analysis of how Somalia's economy functioned in a stateless society. The second was co-authored with Professor Pete Leeson of George Mason University and is about the economics of ransom bonds, a peculiar financial instrument used in piracy during the Napoleonic Wars.

Nowrasteh has also co-authored an academic paper on privateers with Alex Tabarrok that appeared in the Fletcher Security Review and another academic paper about the impact of immigration on economic freedom that appeared in the journal Public Choice. The latter had numerous co-authors.

A 2019 study by Nowrasteh appeared in The World Bank Economic Review. The study found that the influx of Kuwaiti-Palestinian (Palestinians who had worked and lived in Kuwait for decades) refugees into Jordan from during the Gulf War had long-lasting positive effects on Jordanian economic institutions.

=== Commentary ===
Nowrasteh has been a blogger/guest contributor for the Huffington Post, for Forbes magazine, and for The Hill. In addition, he has written pieces for National Journal, Reuters, and many other major newspapers. Nowrasteh has also been quoted as an expert in mainstream press pieces on immigration.
