= Virginia Frazer Boyle =

American poet (1863–1938)

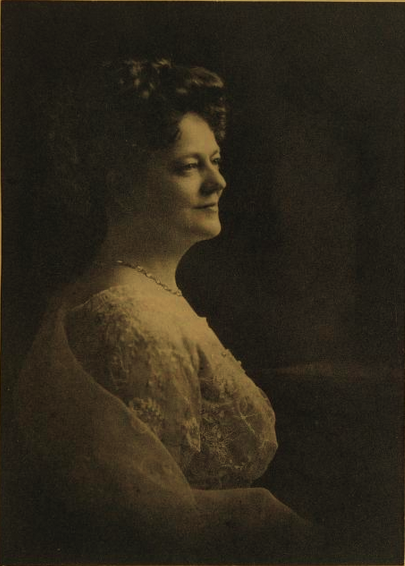
- Boyle in a 1925 publication
- Born: Virginia Frazer; February 14, 1863; Chattanooga, Tennessee, U.S.
- Died: December 13, 1938 (aged 75); Memphis, Tennessee, U.S.
- Occupations: novelist; poet
- Spouse: Thomas Raymond Boyle (m. 1884)
- Writing career
- Notable awards: two medals and a diploma from Italy for her Red Cross work during the WWI

Virginia Frazer Boyle (February 14, 1863 – December 13, 1938) was an American author of prose and poetry. Interested in the Antebellum South, she wrote several novels and more than 100 poems, many of which presented an idealized image of the era of plantation slavery. She served as the poet laureate of the United Confederate Veterans and the Confederated Southern Memorial Association. She had innumerable stories and poems published in magazines. Boyle did extraordinary war work for the U.S. during World War I, receiving citations and medals for her service for Italy, and was made life member of two of the French Academies.

== Early life and education ==
Virginia Frazer was born near Chattanooga, Tennessee, February 14, 1863. She was the daughter of Captain Charles Wesley Frazer, a representative of the Tennessee bar, and organizer of the Confederate Historical Relief Association in 1867, serving as its president during the last thirteen years of his life. Her mother Letitia S. Austin Frazer. Boyle had one brother, Charles Wesley Frazer, and one sister, Phoebe Frazer. Through the father, Boyle is descended from William Heritage, an English barrister. Kinston, North Carolina was built on his grant of land from the crown. His son-in-law was Jesse Cobb, a descendant of that Cobb who came over in the Treasurer in 1613. Boyle's mother was an Austin of Albemarle County, Virginia, and traced her descent to Robert McClenahan, a Scotsman, who came from the North of Ireland to the U.S. in 1623 and settled in Augusta County, Virginia. Robert McClenahan was Sheriff of Augusta County when the county covered several states and his son, Alexander, was a colonel in the Revolutionary Army. Boyle's grandparents Frazer, in 1822 crossed the Allegheny Mountains by wagon train from New Bern, North Carolina, which another ancestor had assisted in forming. Shipping their household goods by sailing vessel to Mobile, Alabama, they helped settle up the frontier of Alabama, then Mississippi, and finally Tennessee. John A. Frazer had what was called "a hot foot" in the vernacular, and took his young wife from a position of luxury to endure the hardships of the pioneer. The family lived in Memphis, Tennessee, for one hundred years.

Boyle's father was an officer in the Confederate States Army and when Boyle was six weeks old, she took her first journey in an army wagon. A little later, this baby was used as a flag of truce to stop the gunners from shelling, at the surrender of Cumberland Gap (1863), where her father was captured. Boyle took her first steps on Johnson's Island Military Prison, where her father was confined in officers' quarters.

Boyle attended the Higbee school in early girlhood, but was mostly educated at home until she was twelve years old, when she entered the High School at Memphis, Tennessee. In her first year in school, Boyle and other students reviewed the class textbook and then requested to drop the teaching of United States history. Boyle was brought before the school board and ordered expelled, but she was reinstated and there was no United States history studied in the school until a different textbook version was introduced.

Boyle began writing verse at eight years of age and when she was fourteen, was contributing to various newspapers under a nom de guerre. The impulse to write seemed innate as there was no reason for it, and no encouragement at that time. But there was always a desire to express in words the status of the South. Boyle was the eldest of three children. The young father had come back from prison to find a ruined home and ruined fortunes. His wife had her hands full with domestic responsibilities and there was no desire for a literary woman in the little family. Boyle's first verses were written on the backs of her father's letters and were folded very small and tucked away in one corner of the nursery where a loose tack had been found in the carpet. But Boyle had not taken into consideration the "spring cleaning", which included the taking up of that carpet; and the entire winter's efforts were swept into the fire by a broom.

Boyle's grandmother in the paternal line was Frances Ann Frazer, well known as a writer of verse in the state of North Carolina. As a girl, Grandmother Frazer had written verses, which were copied and kept in her hatbox when they were not being circulated and copied by admiring friends. This was ample publicity, for it was not seemly for a gentlewoman to appear in the public prints. A daughter of Grandmother Frazer also wrote poems in antebellum times for various newspapers and magazines, but it was always under a nom de plume, without pay, and shyly acknowledged. When Boyle's writing proclivities became insistent, she was secretly encouraged by her father. The first checks came to Boyle almost simultaneously, one from Harper's Magazine and one from The Century Magazine. Boyle showed them to Grandmother Frazer who told her:— "Send them back. Tell them you will be glad for them to publish your work, but you cannot accept money for it, nor publish under your own name... If you receive remuneration for the work of your hands or your brain, you will cease to be a gentlewoman!" Tearfully, a letter was written to the editor of Harper's, who returned the check with the simple statement that it was the policy of the magazine never to print anything unless it was paid for. Boyle compromised by dividing equally the checks between the Young Woman's Boarding Home and the Leath Orphanage, both women enterprises.

After high school graduation, Boyle did not go to college but, ambitious to continue her studies, she took up law, logic and belles lettres with her father and later passed collegiate examinations. Her studies with him were interesting. Cases being tried in the courts were brought home; even copies of briefs.

== Career ==
In 1884, she married Thomas Raymond Boyle, of Hardeman County, Tennessee, a practicing attorney in the Courts of Tennessee. At her father's death in 1897, she had her husband quit claim to her, that she might deal as femme sole, and assumed entire charge of his estate. She became the financial head of the family, the protector and provider for the widowed remnants of his own mother's family as well. Through the years, Boyle carried on her literary work, but kept her father's business as preeminent.

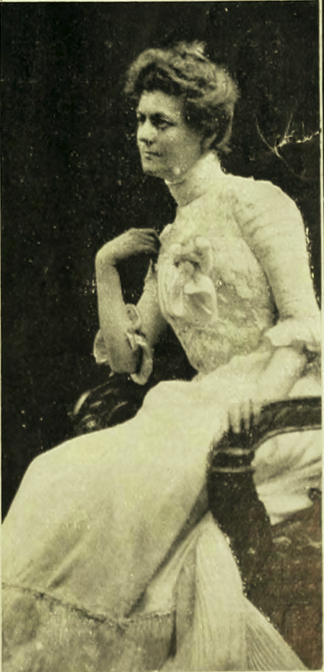
Boyle circa 1911

In the late 1890's, as an adjunct to the Ladies' Confederate Memorial Association, Boyle organized the Junior Confederate Memorial Association, under the organization of her mother. There were about 250 children who met in her home once a month. Historical subjects were discussed for them as far as possible by veterans who participated in the events under discussion. Often the subject was handled by both Confederate and Union veterans. More and better histories were being written at the time but it was the only way she could then carry out her desire that young people should not have as hard a time in acquiring the history of their country as she had had. The Drum and Fife Corps was organized, and a special instructor detailed to teach them every Friday at Boyle's home.

=== World War I ===
Through all these years, Boyle found time to devote to philanthropic work, and at the breaking out of World War I, she was ready to direct others in the enormous work needed. As soon as her Drum and Fife Corps boys went to the Mexican border, Boyle set about the resuscitation of the local Red Cross, was made chairman of membership, and remained as such during the major portion of the war. The first pair of socks for their knitting department was made by Boyle, who organized her knitting classes at her home — ages, eighty years to six years. Her old editor, Robert Underwood Johnson, wired Boyle that he had put her on his central committee for the American Poets' Ambulance in Italy, which he and Henry van Dyke Jr. had just organized. Boyle organized her local committee which sent the money for two ambulances, costing US$2,000 each, in three weeks time. A drive was also put through with a sale of medals for the Italian Relief.

Boyle was made a member of the Writers' Bureau of the Committee on Public Information, in Washington, D.C., which released articles for U.S. propaganda every few days. She also served for The Vigilantes , an organization of writers, poets and artists in New York City. Then the request for aid came from the Second and Fourth Districts of the Liberty Loan Drives, located respectively at Cleveland, Ohio and New York City. Boyle's Liberty Bond stories for the Cleveland district went into issues of from 1,000,000 to 3,000,000. Then the YMCA made a call for articles or poems. Boyle was made a member of the local Executive Board of the Women's Council of National Defense . She was chair for all local Italian Relief Committees, and organized the association for the adoption of the war orphans quartered on Siena. Then, too, there were Red Cross Chapters to be organized in adjacent towns and Liberty Loan addresses to be made. Boyle fitted out motherless boys she heard of with sweaters and kits. She adopted a motherless boy overseas to write to and look after, besides keeping up with her own Drum and Fife boys, two of whom were killed. Boyle never left Memphis during the war, but her work touched many points. She received many prized letters during the war, and at its close, among them one each from President Woodrow Wilson and General John J. Pershing, as well as an autographed photograph by General Ferdinand Foch.

=== Author ===
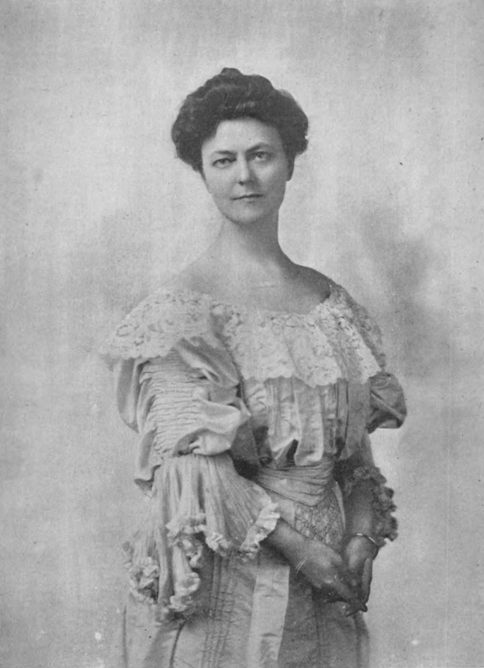
1905

She was widely known as a novelist, her writings including Brokenburne, published in 1897, Serena and Devil Tales, which was published in 1900 and ran in Harper's Magazine as a serial for more than a year, while later it was published in book form and translated into several languages. Serena was published by A. S. Barnes & Company of New York in 1905 and has also had a wide sale. Boyle was likewise the author of a book of verse entitled Love Songs and Bugle Calls, published in 1906, and one of her most interesting and widely read poems was "Embers of Glory". She issued still another volume called Silver Sands. Most of her writings were published in the Harpers and Century Magazines and were, therefore, widely read. In 1896, she wrote the Prize Centennial Ode, Tennessee, and in 1900, her series of African American folklore tales appeared in Harpers Magazine. Further writings to her credit included: "Jefferson Davis, Centennial Ode", 1908; "Abraham Lincoln", for the centenary celebration of the Philadelphia Brigade Association, 1909; "The Dream of the Alabama", centenary of Admiral Semmes, C. S. N., for the Confederate Memorial Association, 1909; "Christ in the Argonne", 1918; and "Song of Memphis", 1919. One of her war poems, Union, was generally published, having been translated into several languages. It was printed in four school readers, one in Massachusetts, two in Illinois, and one in Virginia. Much of her time was spent in New York.

Many of Boyle's stories present an idealized image of plantation life in the era of slavery, including stereotyped images of happy slaves loyal to their white masters. In recognition of her writings, she was honored by several societies that promoted the Lost Cause ideology. In 1913 she was the poet laureate of the United Confederate Veterans and previous to that time, was poet laureate of the Confederated Southern Memorial Association, while in 1915 she occupied the same position in connection with the Sons of Confederate Veterans.

== Personal life ==
In religion, Boyle was a member of the Baptist church.

She belonged also to the Ladies Confederate Memorial Association, which was organized by her mother in 1885, and she had membership with the Daughters of the Confederacy. She likewise belonged to the Authors League of America and the Poetry Society of America and was a member of the "Societe Academique d'Histoire Internationale" and the "Academie Latine des Sciences, Arts and Belles Lettres", both of Paris.

Virginia Frazer Boyle died in Memphis, Tennessee, December 13, 1938.

== Awards and honors ==
She was awarded two medals and a diploma from Italy for her Red Cross work during the war.

== Selected works ==
=== Books ===
- The Other Side
- Brokenburne: A Southern Auntie's War Tale (1897) (text)
- Dark Er de Moon: A Devil's Tale (1899)
- Devil Tales (1900) (text)
- Serena: A Novel (1905) (text)
- Love's Songs and Bugle Calls (1906) (text)
- The Making of the Stars and Bars (1915)
- The Gold Star (1918)

=== Canticles ===
- "The Song of Memphis" (1919)
- "Christ in the Argonne"

=== Poems ===
- "The Other Side: An Historic Poem" (1893)
- "Old 'Bias's Vision" (1894)
- "Tennessee Centennial Ode"
- "Armistice Day"
- "Abraham Lincoln: A Centennial Poem" (1909)
- "The Wizard of the Saddle"
- "The Dream of the Alabama," centenary of Admiral Semmes (1909)
- "Union" (1917)
- "Robert Edward Lee: The South's Gift to Fame, a Poem" (19??)
