= George Hunter (Coca-Cola bottler) =

American businessman and philanthropist

George Thomas Hunter (1886–1950) was a businessman and philanthropist in Chattanooga, Tennessee, who inherited and ran the Coca-Cola Bottling Company empire from his uncle Benjamin Thomas. Hunter grew up in Maysville, KY, but moved to Chattanooga in 1904 to live with his aunt and uncle. Hunter's most notable philanthropic efforts is the creation of The Benwood Foundation and The Hunter Museum of American Art. Hunter Hall at UT Chattanooga was posthumously named in his honor.

== Early life ==
George Hunter was born in Maysville, KY, but moved to Chattanooga, TN in 1904 to live with his aunt Anne and uncle Benjamin Thomas, who was a pioneer in the Coca-Cola bottling industry in the United States, so that he could learn the ins and outs of the Coca-Cola Bottling Company. While in Chattanooga, he attended Baylor School, a private school. When his uncle Ben and aunt Anne died, Hunter inherited his aunt Anne and uncle Ben's estate in the Bluff View district, which is now used as the location for The Hunter Museum of American Art. Hunter died in 1950 leaving behind no spouse or children to carry on the Hunter name.

== Career ==
After learning how the company worked from his uncle, George Hunter started working in the Coca-Cola Bottling Company, which started in Birmingham, AL, in 1906 where he served as secretary. When his uncle, Benjamin, died in 1914, Hunter took over the company as president. In 1941, he became chairman of the board and decided to hire DeSales Harrison from the Atlanta company to take over as president. Today, the company is still growing and is one of the third largest bottler in the United States with over 3000 employees.

== Philanthropy ==
In 1944, Hunter created the Benwood Foundation, in honor of his uncle. The foundation focuses on grants for public education, arts and culture, the environment, and neighborhood and community development. The foundation gave a five million dollar grant to the Public Education Foundation to help student achievement. This foundation benefaction set a precedent in Tennessee law when Chancellor Alvin Ziegler ruled that taxes, after one's death, would be borne by the residuary estate.

In 1951, a year after Hunter's death, the Chattanooga Art Association contacted the Benwood Foundation and together they created Chattanooga's first art museum, the George Thomas Hunter Gallery of Art, which is now known as the Hunter Museum of American Art, to honor Hunter and his philanthropic work. The museum opened a year later on July 12, 1952, and now focuses on art from the colonial period to modern day art. The museum was also a starting point for the entire Bluff View Art district to flourish and become the popular spot in Chattanooga that it is today. In 1957 Hunter Hall was built at The University of Tennessee. Hunter Hall, the home of the college of education at The University of Tennessee at Chattanooga, is named in George Hunter's honor for all of his philanthropic work for the city of Chattanooga.
