= Mozella Esther Lewis =

American pharmacist

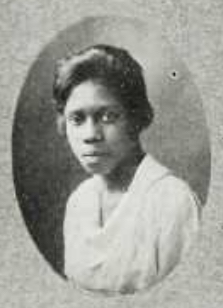
- Mozella Esther Lewis, from the 1919 yearbook of the Howard University Academy
- Born: about 1901; Chattanooga, Tennessee, US
- Died: April 16, 1945; Los Angeles, California, US
- Other names: Moselle Ester Lewis, Mozelle E. Lewis
- Occupations: Pharmacist, businesswoman
- Years active: 1925–1945

Mozella Esther Lewis (born about 1901 – died April 16, 1945) was an American pharmacist and businesswoman. She wrote an early history of African-American achievements in the pharmacy profession, and ran a drug store with another Black woman pharmacist in Los Angeles for over a decade.

== Early life ==
Mozella Esther Lewis was born in Chattanooga, Tennessee, the daughter of Alexander Lewis and Eugenia Dangerfield Lewis. Her father worked as a waiter on the railroad. After her parents' divorce, she was raised in the home of her paternal grandmother, Savannah Lewis. She attended Chattanooga schools until she enrolled at Howard University's preparatory school, from which she graduated in 1919.

Lewis completed studies in the Howard University School of Pharmacy in 1925. Her thesis, "History of the Negro in Pharmacy", explored the history of African-American achievements in the pharmacy profession, including a biographical listing of 176 African-American pharmacists. Her thesis was awarded a medal by the Howard faculty, and republished in The American Druggist professional publication.

== Career ==
After graduating from Howard University, Lewis was a pharmacist at the Tuskegee Institute Hospital, and in Washington, D.C. and North Carolina. She moved to Los California in 1933. In 1934, with another Black woman pharmacist, Helen Lee Williams Hairston, she opened the L & W Drug Store in Los Angeles. She was active in community organizations, including the YWCA, the NAACP, and the Southern California Medical, Dental, and Pharamaceutical Association. She and Williams were both officers in the medical sorority Rho Psi Phi.

== Personal life ==
Mozella Esther Lewis died in 1945, in her forties, in Los Angeles, California. Her grave is in Evergreen Cemetery, in the Boyle Heights neighborhood of Los Angeles. In 2016, her thesis was republished in the journal Pharmacy in History.
