= Benjamin Thomas (industrialist) =

Benjamin Franklin Thomas (1860–1914) was a Chattanooga, Tennessee, businessman and industrialist who pioneered the development of the Coca-Cola bottling industry and founded the Coca-Cola Bottling Company.

In 1899 Benjamin Thomas and Joseph Whitehead traveled from Chattanooga to Atlanta, Georgia, to meet with Asa Griggs Candler, the owner of Coca-Cola, in hopes of securing the rights to bottle the beverage. At the time bottling Coca-Cola was seen as an untested industry, and Candler had concerns over maintaining the quality of his product. Eventually he sold the rights to bottle Coca-Cola in the United States to Thomas and Whitehead for one dollar.

In 1894 Benjamin married Ann Taylor Jones. They had no children. In 1904 they invited their nephew George Hunter to move to Chattanooga to learn the bottling business and to be their heir. In 1944 George Hunter established the Benwood Foundation as a perpetual tribute to Benjamin.
