= Benwood Foundation =

Charitable foundation

- Formation: 1944
- Type: Charitable Foundation
- Headquarters: Chattanooga, TN, United States
- President: Sarah Morgan
- Revenue: $6,579,953 (2015)
- Expenses: $11,100,092 (2015)
- Website: www.benwood.org

The Benwood Foundation is a charitable foundation created in 1944 by George Hunter in honor of his uncle, Benjamin Thomas who pioneered the Coca-Cola bottling industry and founded the Coca-Cola Bottling Company. George Hunter was the heir of Benjamin Thomas, and much of the wealth related to the Coca-Cola Bottling Company passed on to the Foundation. As of 2004 The Benwood Foundation distributes between $4 and $5 million annually in grants and donations.

== History ==
Upon George Hunter's death in 1950, 70 percent of the Coca-Cola Bottling Company stock went to the Foundation. This led to a probate law precedent-setting lawsuit when family members sued regarding the tax status of the donation. A 1952 court ruling stated that the Foundation did not have to pay death duties, which became the responsibility of the residuary estate. The ruling was upheld on appeal.

== Focus ==
The Foundation's grantmaking focus is on Public Education, Arts & Culture, the Environment, and Neighborhood & Community Development.

== See also ==
- Benjamin Thomas
- George Hunter
