= Journal of Private Enterprise =

The Journal of Private Enterprise is a peer-reviewed academic journal of economics published by the Association of Private Enterprise Education. It was established in 1985 and appears twice a year. Edward Stringham (Fayetteville State University) has been the editor-in-chief since 2006. The journal is abstracted and indexed in ABI/Inform-Proquest, EBSCO databases, EconLit, the Journal of Economic Literature, Handelsblatt Ranking VWL, and Scopus.
