= List of Baylor School alumni =

The following is a list of notable alumni from Baylor School in Chattanooga, Tennessee.

== 1900s ==
- Jo Conn Guild, 1905, electric utility manager and anti-TVA campaigner
- George Hunter, 1907, Coca-Cola bottler and philanthropist; namesake of Hunter Hall on campus

== 1910s ==
- Thomas Cartter Lupton, Coca-Cola bottler and philanthropist

== 1920s ==
- Albert Hodges Morehead, 1925, bridge editor, The New York Times
- Herman Hickman, 1928, College Football Hall of Fame member for the University of Tennessee; head football coach for Yale University

== 1930s ==
- Thomas J. Anderson, 1930, author, farmer, and American Party presidential candidate
- Hugh Beaumont, 1930, actor who played Ward Cleaver on Leave it to Beaver

== 1940s ==
- Ralph Puckett, 1943, Medal of Honor recipient for heroism in the Korean War
- David M. Abshire, 1944, former ambassador to NATO; former director of the Center for Strategic and International Studies; adviser to president Ronald Reagan
- William E. Duff, 1945, author and FBI counterintelligence specialist
- John T. Lupton II, 1944, Coca-Cola bottler and philanthropist
- Scott L. Probasco, Jr., 1946, banker and philanthropist
- Sidney A. Wallace, 1945, U.S. Coast Guard rear admiral

== 1950s ==
- Dave Bristol, 1951, former Major League Baseball manager
- Fob James, 1952, former governor of Alabama
- Coleman Barks, 1955, poet and interpreter of the Sufi poet Rumi
- Barry Moser, 1958, artist, illustrator, publisher
- Charlie Norwood, 1959, dentist and congressman for Georgia in the 104th and six subsequent Congresses
- Robert Taylor Segraves, 1959, psychiatrist, author

== 1960s ==
- Philip Morehead, 1960, head of music staff of the Lyric Opera of Chicago, the Lyric Opera Center for American Artists, and the Patrick G. and Shirley W. Ryan Opera Center; conductor; editor; author
- Wendell Rawls, Jr., 1960, journalist, Pulitzer Prize winner
- Shelby Coffey III, 1964, journalist, editor of the Los Angeles Times, Dallas Morning News, and U.S. News & World Report; trustee of the Newseum
- Brian Gottfried, 1969, World No. 3-ranked tennis player
- John Hannah, 1969, NFL football player for the Patriots, Hall-of-Famer; after three years at Baylor, graduated from Albertville High School in Albertville, Alabama
- Roscoe Tanner, 1969, professional tennis player, Australian Open winner; Wimbledon runner-up
- Allen Trammel, football player

== 1970s ==
- Arthur Golden, 1974, author, Memoirs of a Geisha
- Robert E. Cooper, Jr., 1975, Tennessee attorney general
- Bill Dedman, 1978, journalist, Pulitzer Prize winner, author of the bestselling book Empty Mansions: The Mysterious Life of Huguette Clark and the Spending of a Great American Fortune
- Francis M. Fesmire, 1978, emergency physician, heart research scientist, "hero" of the American College of Emergency Physicians, and winner of the 2006 Ig Nobel Prize

== 1980s ==
- Geoff Gaberino, 1980, swimmer, Olympic gold medalist
- Alan Shuptrine, 1981, realist painter, gilder
- Tim Kelly, 1985, current mayor of Chattanooga
- Andy Berke, 1986, attorney, former Tennessee state senator, and former mayor of Chattanooga

== 1990s ==
- Devin Galligan, 1990, founder of the charity Strain the Brain
- Aaron McCollough, 1990, poet

== 2000s ==
- Blaire Pancake, 2000, Miss Tennessee
- Luke List, 2003, professional golfer
- Jacques McClendon, 2006, professional football player (guard)
- Harris English, 2007, professional golfer
- Brad Hamilton, 2008, competitive swimmer, multiple Jamaican record holder
- Stephan Jäger, 2008, professional golfer
- Keith Mitchell, 2010, professional golfer

== 2010s ==
- Reggie Upshaw, 2013, basketball player in the Israel Basketball Premier League
- Nick Tiano, 2015, American football player

== 2020s ==
- Nick Kurtz, 2021, professional baseball player
- Henry Godbout, 2022, professional baseball player
