= John T. Lupton II =

American heir and philanthropist (1926–2010)

- Born: July 23, 1926; Chattanooga, Tennessee
- Died: May 16, 2010 (aged 83); Lookout Mountain, Tennessee

John T. Lupton II (July 23, 1926 – May 16, 2010) was an American heir to a Coca-Cola bottling fortune, businessman and philanthropist.

== Biography ==
=== Early life ===
His grandfather was John Thomas Lupton, founder of the Dixie Coca-Cola Bottling Company Plant, later known as the JTL Corporation, Coca-Cola's largest bottler. His father, Thomas Cartter Lupton, was the founder of the Lyndhurst Foundation. He had a brother, Joe Henderson, and a sister, Elizabeth Lupton Davenport. He was born on July 23, 1926, in Chattanooga, Tennessee, and attended the Baylor School, where he was captain of the swimming team as well as a letterman in varsity football, basketball and baseball. He served in the United States Navy during the Second World War and spent a year in the Pacific Ocean as a radioman. He enrolled at the University of North Carolina, where he majored in business administration.

=== Career ===
In 1946, he worked as a loader of the bottle-washing machine at a Coca-Cola bottling plant in Macon, Georgia. He worked for Dixie Yarns for a couple of years, but returned to the family business when his father fell ill in 1956. He sat on the Board of Directors of Coca-Cola from 1956 to 1982. When his father died in 1977, he inherited the family business, JTL Corp., and quadrupled the business by acquiring bottlers in Florida, Texas, Colorado, Arizona and elsewhere. In 1986, he sold the bottling company to Coca-Cola Enterprises for US$1.4 billion. He was one of the candidates to become the first Chairman of Coca-Cola Enterprises, but was turned down.

An avid golfer, he was Chairman of the Arnold Palmer Golf Company and helped finance the Honors Course near Ooltewah, Tennessee north of Chattanooga. He provided funding to create the Tennessee Golf Foundation and the Golf House Tennessee. He also started the Miller-Reid Advertising Agency. He was a member of the Augusta National Golf Club.

=== Philanthropy ===
After his father's death in 1977, he took over the Lyndhurst Foundation and focused on primary health care, elementary and secondary education, and arts and cultural activities. With the foundation, he donated to the Tennessee Riverwalk. In 2001, he donated $25 million to the University of Tennessee at Chattanooga. He also raised $50 million for the Tennessee Aquarium. He also donated to the Boys & Girls Clubs of America.

A man who rarely gave interviews to the press, Lupton spoke with reporter Bill Dedman of The Chattanooga Times in 1986 about how he was a different kind of community philanthropist than his father, sponsoring the open community planning process then called Chattanooga Venture. "I've never had any skepticism about the community, about the river, or about the riverfront project. ... The biggest problem that Chattanooga has ever had, they've all buttoned it up at night and went home to their little bitty conclaves and nobody communicated with anybody--including him [he points at his father's photograph] and his cohorts. They wanted to keep this place a secret. They didn't want anybody knowing about what a nice little deal they had here."

=== Personal life ===
He married Alice Probasco in 1948, whose grandfather, Harry Scott Probasco (1858-1919), founded the American National Bank (now part of Regions Financial Corporation) and father, Scott L. Probasco, Sr. (1890-1962), a trust company that became part of the SunTrust Banks. She is Scott L. Probasco, Jr.'s sister. They resided in Lookout Mountain, Tennessee, a suburb of Chattanooga, and attended the Church of the Good Shepherd. They had a son, Thomas Cartter Lupton II of Sullivan's Island, South Carolina, and three daughters, Alice Lupton Smith of Lookout Mountain, TN, Katherine Lupton Juett of Dallas, Texas and Margaret Lupton Gerber of Memphis, Tennessee.

He was a member of the Mountain City Club, an invitation-only private club in Chattanooga. After suffering from a debilitating stroke, he died in 2010. His will included real estate in Tennessee, North Carolina and Florida and at least $20 million in cash.
