= Vision 2000 (Chattanooga) =

Urban redevelopment initiative in Chattanooga, Tennessee

Vision 2000 was a program in Chattanooga, Tennessee, established in 1984 by the nonprofit Chattanooga Venture. The program aimed to reduce city pollution, revive the downtown area, and build more housing. The program also sought to establish businesses and parks that would attract tourists to the city.

About 1,700 Chattanooga citizens participated in the Vision 2000 planning process, proposing and voting on 2,500 ideas to determine a final list of 40 goals. By 1992, Vision 2000 had led to the implementation of 223 programs and projects, most famously the Tennessee Aquarium.

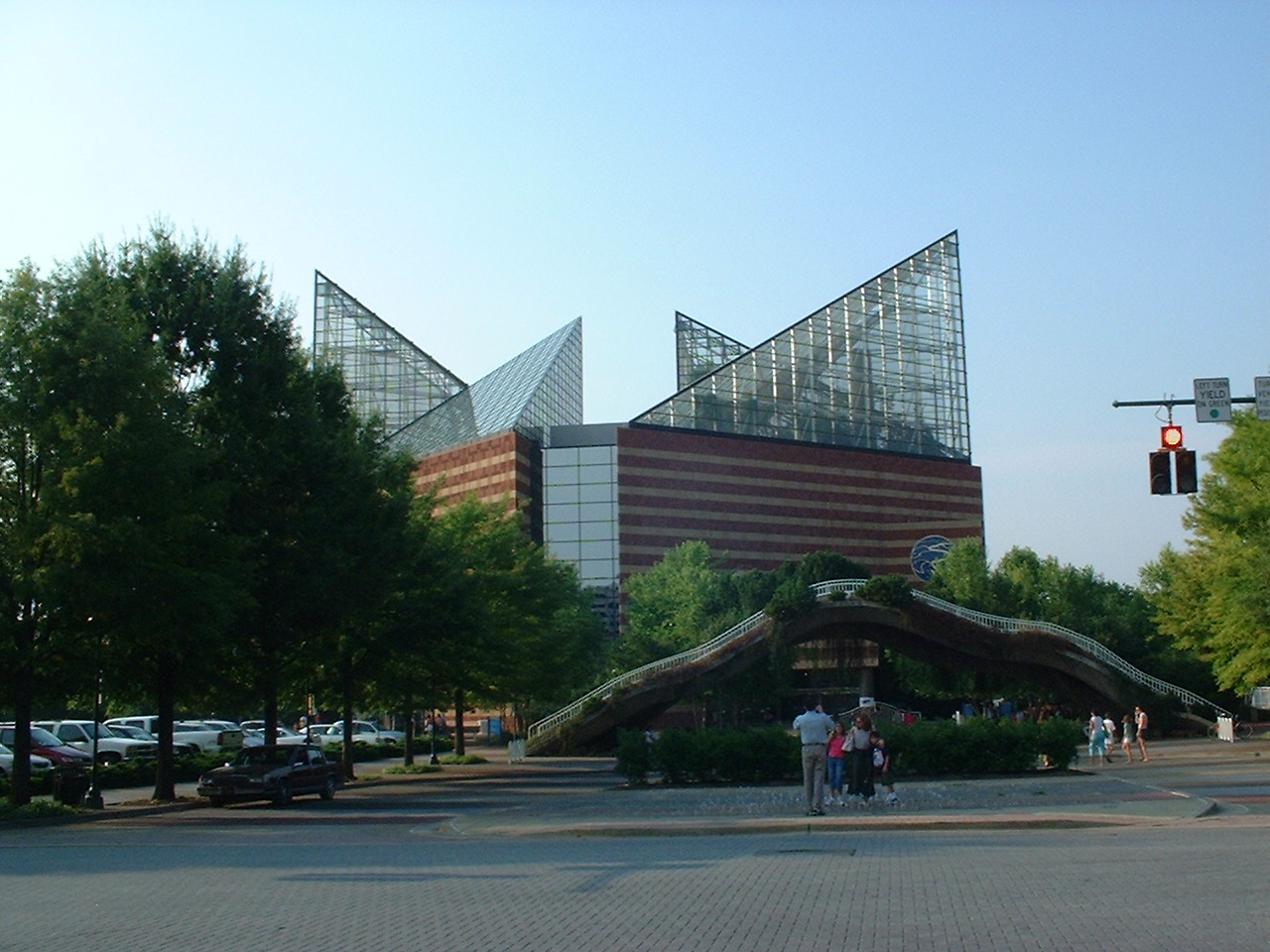
Tennessee Aquarium

== History ==
In the later 19th century, Chattanooga became one of the first industrial powerhouses in the Southern United States. In the 1960s and 1970s, the city began to suffer from the effects of deindustrialization, with many manufacturing jobs lost. The city had also long suffered from heavy pollution from industrial plants. The mountainous terrain exacerbated the problem, trapping pollutants that would settle over the city. In October 1969, Walter Cronkite declared Chattanooga the "dirtiest city in America" in a news broadcast. Residents sometimes had to drive with headlights on during the day in order to see through the smog.

In 1984, Chattanooga Venture invited citizens to participate in devising Vision 2000, with the goal of addressing the effects of industrialization and improving Chattanooga as a place to live. Vision 2000 collaborated with another local group, the Moccasin Bend Task Force, to produce the 1985 "Tennessee Riverpark Master Plan", focusing on the Tennessee River as a potential center of revitalization.

James Rouse, an influential urban planner and philanthropist, praised Venture and its Vision 2000 as an example to cities across the country, saying "[I sense] a very impressive spirit here that something is going to happen in this city."

== Developments ==
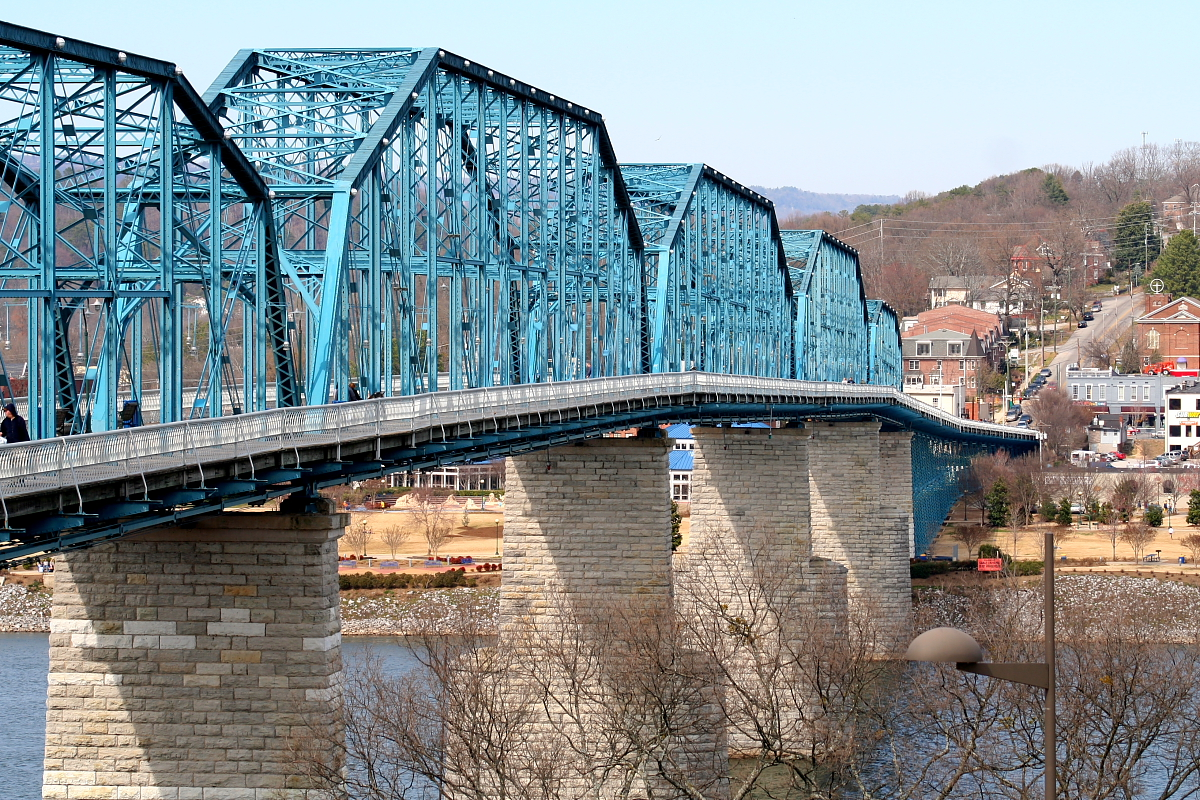
Walnut Street Bridge

Vision 2000 was involved in a number of city developments, including:

- The Riverwalk, a 16-mile (26 km) path along the Tennessee River connecting various city attractions and points of interest, completed in 2005
- The Tennessee Aquarium, opened in 1992 as the world's largest freshwater aquarium
- Repairs to, and reopening of, the long-closed Walnut Street Bridge as a pedestrian bridge, now one of the longest walking bridges in the world
- The Creative Discovery Museum, a downtown children's museum
- A movie theater
