= John Thomas Lupton =

American lawyer and businessman

- Born: 1862; Winchester, Virginia, U.S.
- Died: July 31, 1933 (aged 70–71); Brevard, North Carolina, U.S.
- Education: Roanoke College University of Virginia
- Occupations: Lawyer, industrialist and philanthropist
- Spouse: Elizabeth Patten (m. 1889)
- Children: Thomas Cartter Lupton

Signature
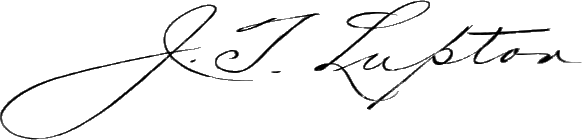

John Thomas Lupton (1862–1933) was an American lawyer, industrialist and philanthropist who along with Benjamin Thomas and Joseph Whitehead, obtained exclusive rights from Asa Candler to bottle and sell Coca-Cola.

== Early life ==
Lupton was born near Winchester, Virginia, and received his undergraduate degree from Roanoke College in 1884 follow by his law degree from the University of Virginia. After a visit to the home of a fellow student, he settled in Chattanooga, Tennessee in 1887.

Lupton soon met Elizabeth Patten, daughter of Chattanooga Medicine Company founder Zeboim Cartter Patten, and they married on November 14, 1889. They had a son, Thomas Cartter Lupton, to whom they left the bulk of their combined wealth.

== Career ==
After his marriage, Lupton took a job as legal counsel to the Chattanooga Medicine Company (now Chattem), eventually becoming company vice president and treasurer.

Lupton, Whitehead and Thomas were the primary investors in the Dixie Coca-Cola Bottling Company, the first Coca-Cola bottling plant in the United States. Following the business' rapid success, the partners divided the country into territories and gave various family members responsibility over them and began selling bottling franchises. By 1909, nearly 400 bottling operations had been opened.

John Thomas Lupton died in Brevard, North Carolina on July 31, 1933.

Lupton's grandson, John T. Lupton II, sold the family's bottling operations back to Coca-Cola in 1986 for $1.4 billion in cash.

== Philanthropy ==
Lupton was a significant contributor to a number of southern schools, colleges and universities; Baylor School in Chattanooga, Oglethorpe University and the University of Tennessee at Chattanooga all have named buildings on their campuses in his honor.

== See also ==
- Coca-Cola Bottling Company
- Cartter Lupton
- Lupton City, Chattanooga
- Lyndhurst Foundation
- Zeboim Cartter Patten
- Benjamin Thomas
- Joseph Whitehead
- 1921, received an honorary degree from Oglethorpe University
