= Tennessee Aquarium =

Public aquarium in the United States

- Interactive map of Tennessee Aquarium
- 35.0557°N 85.3108°W
- Date opened: May 1, 1992 (River Journey Building); April 29, 2005 (Ocean Journey Building)
- Location: Chattanooga, Tennessee, United States
- No. of animals: 12,000
- No. of species: 795 (as of 2013)
- Volume of largest tank: 618,000 US gal (2,340,000 L)
- Total volume of tanks: 1,100,000 US gal (4,200,000 L)
- Memberships: AZA
- Website: tnaqua.org

The Tennessee Aquarium is a non-profit public aquarium located in Chattanooga, Tennessee, United States. It opened in 1992 on the banks of the Tennessee River in downtown Chattanooga, with a major expansion added in 2005. The aquarium, which has been accredited by the Association of Zoos and Aquariums (AZA) since 1993, is home to more than 12,000 animals representing almost 800 species.

More than 20 million people have visited the facility, with the twenty-millionth visitor arriving in March 2013. It is consistently recognized as one of the country's top public aquariums.

== Exhibits ==
The Tennessee Aquarium's exhibits are housed in two structures, the original River Journey building which opened in 1992 and the neighboring Ocean Journey expansion, which opened in 2005.

=== River Journey ===
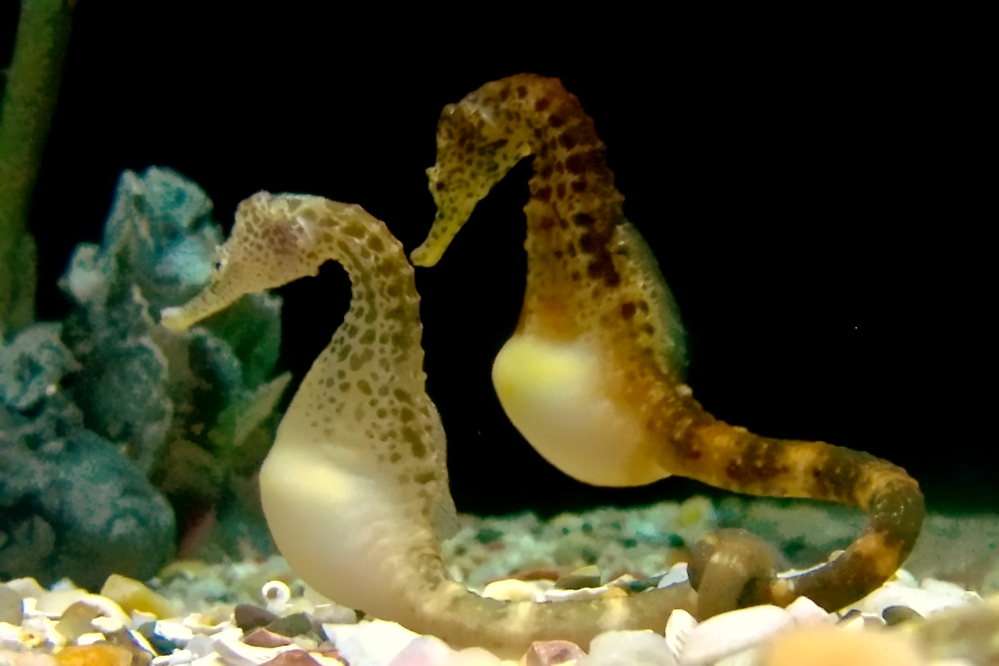
Potbelly seahorses on exhibit in River Journey

The River Journey facility is 130,000 square feet (12,000 m^{2}), having a floor area approximate to that of a twelve-story building. It contains a total of 400,000 US gallons (1,500,000 L), and was the largest freshwater aquarium in the world when it opened. It is organized around the theme of the Story of the River, following the path of a raindrop from high in the Appalachian Mountains to the Gulf of Mexico. Approximately two-thirds of the facility's display follows this theme, with the rest devoted to smaller aquatic exhibits hosting organisms from around the world.

Major exhibits in River Journey include:

- The Appalachian Cove Forest featuring River Otter Falls, which opened in 2014 and replaced a smaller exhibit of North American river otters. It also displays free-flying North American song birds, native fish species including shiners, daces, darters, redhorse, hog suckers and trout, and an artificial waterfall falling into a 30,000-US-gallon (110,000 L) mountain sink.
- Delta Country, which exhibits species from the Mississippi River delta. Its centerpiece is Alligator Bayou, which opened in 2015 and features a group of young American alligators and a pair of alligator snapping turtles.
- Rivers of the World, which includes several small to medium-large aquaria that represent the Amazon River, Congo (Zaire) River, Fly River and others. This gallery is also home to the aquarium's electric eel, Miguel Wattson, which "communicates" with the public through a Twitter account to which pre-programmed tweets are posted when it emits electricity. In December 2019 the eel's electricity was also used to power the lights on a Christmas tree.
- The Tennessee River gallery, which exhibits species found in the Tennessee River valley. Its centerpiece is the 145,000-US-gallon (550,000 L) Nickajack Lake tank featuring species which live in the intensively managed Tennessee River itself, including the American paddlefish and channel catfish.
- River Giants, which contains giant freshwater fish from around the world, such as alligator gar, arapaima, giant pangasius, redtail catfish and freshwater whipray.

River Journey also displays turtles, seahorses, frogs and other aquatic and marine life.

=== Ocean Journey ===
Ocean Journey, a 60,000 square foot structure equivalent in height to a ten-story building, opened in 2005 and contains a total of 700,000 US gallons (2,600,000 L). It ostensibly follows the theme of the River Journey by following the river into the Gulf of Mexico. This facility includes hyacinth macaws, a touch tank of small sharks and rays, and a butterfly garden with free-flying South American species.

Major exhibits in Ocean Journey include:

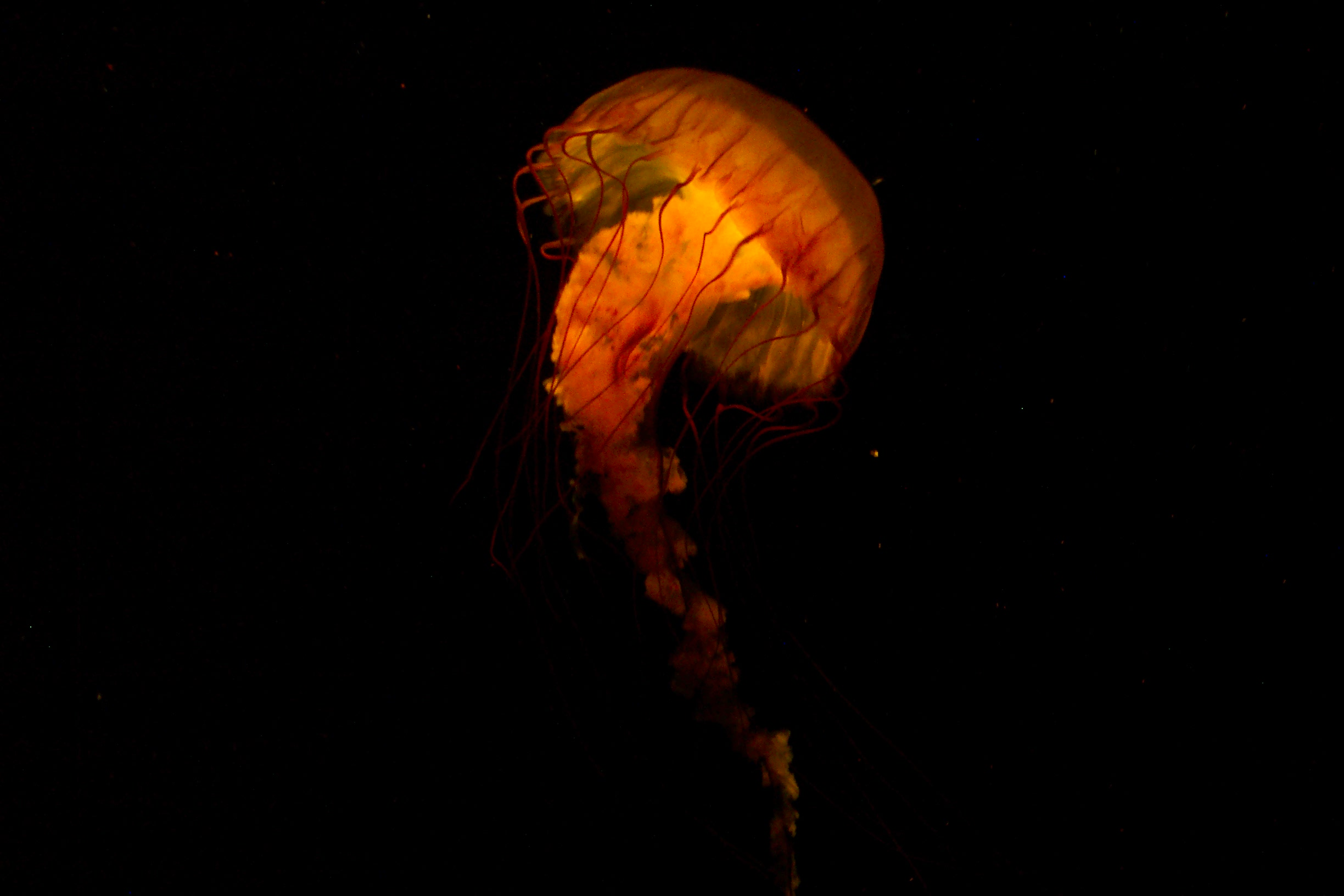
Sea nettle on exhibit in Ocean Journey

- The Secret Reef, the largest tank in Ocean Journey (and the Tennessee Aquarium), containing 618,000 US gallons (2,340,000 L). It depicts the environment of the Flower Garden Banks National Marine Sanctuary in the Gulf of Mexico and can be viewed from three levels including the Undersea Cavern, an underwater walk-through feature. The species exhibited in the Secret Reef include sand tiger sharks, bonnethead sharks and green sea turtles, one of which, Oscar, is a rescue animal missing much of its rear flippers due to injuries from a boat and a predator.
- The Boneless Beauties and Jellies: Living Art galleries, which exhibit invertebrates including corals, jellyfish, cuttlefish, giant Pacific octopuses, and Japanese spider crabs. Jellies: Living Art is a collaboration with the nearby Hunter Museum of American Art and includes rotating exhibits of art glass alongside the jellyfish.
- Penguins' Rock, which displays macaroni penguins and gentoo penguins onshore and swimming in a 16,000-US-gallon (61,000 L) tank.

=== Offsite activities ===
In addition to its exhibit halls, the Tennessee Aquarium includes two public offsite facilities. The River Gorge Explorer, a 65-foot catamaran tour boat, offers daily tours of the nearby Tennessee River Gorge and other sites along the Tennessee River, boarding from the public pier in Ross's Landing Park adjacent to the aquarium. The aquarium also operates an IMAX 3D theater.

== History ==
=== Planning and development ===
The Tennessee Aquarium was designed to serve as a cornerstone for redevelopment in downtown Chattanooga by reconnecting the city with the Tennessee River. At the beginning of the 1980s the Chattanooga-based Lyndhurst Foundation funded a series of initiatives to promote revitalization in the city, which was suffering from the impacts of deindustrialization and population decline. In 1981 the University of Tennessee's urban design program, with funding from Lyndhurst, established the Urban Design Studio in Chattanooga as an opportunity for its students to gain real-world experience in urban planning. This led to the first public mention of an aquarium project, in a 1982 student exhibit of what they described as an "urban design structure" for downtown Chattanooga and the adjacent riverfront. Another Lyndhurst-funded venture, the Moccasin Bend Task Force, was impaneled in 1982 by the City of Chattanooga and Hamilton County to study options for the Moccasin Bend archaeological site immediately north of the Tennessee River, but expanded its scope to cover the city's entire 22-mile riverfront. Its Tennessee Riverpark Master Plan, finalized in 1985, also included a recommendation for a riverfront aquarium. The aquarium plan was additionally endorsed by Vision 2000, a public visioning process carried out in 1984 under the auspices of the nonprofit Chattanooga Venture, as one of forty goals set out for the city to pursue.

Development of the aquarium and the adjoining Ross's Landing Park, part of the Tennessee Riverpark project, was funded by a combination of nonprofit, public, and private individual supporters. The site selected for the aquarium was a group of abandoned warehouses at the foot of Chattanooga's Broad Street, which was acquired for $4.5 million by the RiverCity Company, a nonprofit development agency created in 1986 to implement the Tennessee Riverpark Master Plan, and later deeded to the aquarium. The park received public funds, but the $45 million needed to construct the aquarium was raised privately. John T. Lupton, the chairman of the Lyndhurst Foundation, contributed $10 million from the foundation and $11 million of his personal funds to the project, as well as raising funds from other donors.

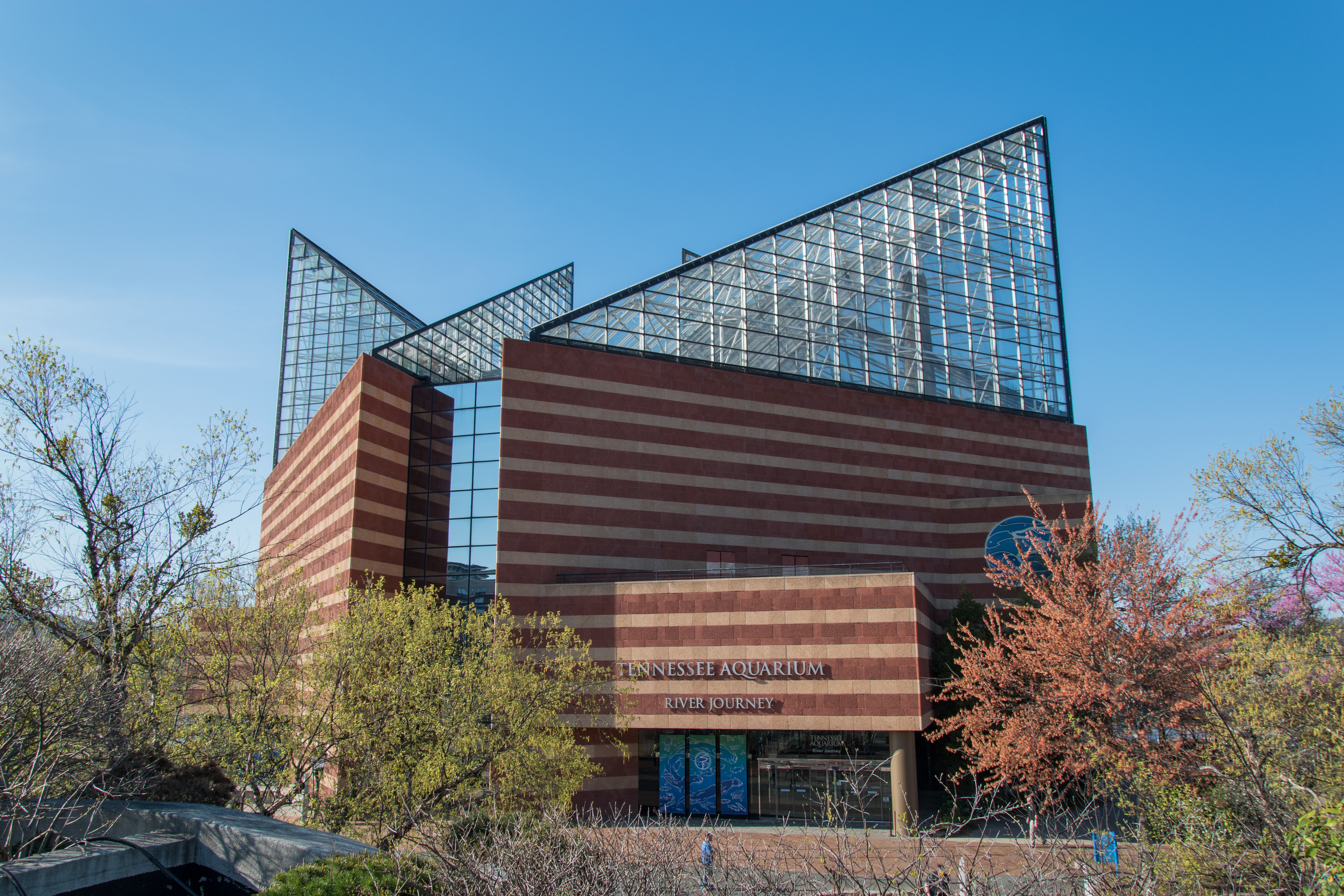
River Journey, the first Tennessee Aquarium building

The aquarium building was designed by Cambridge Seven Associates, which had previously designed the National Aquarium in Baltimore and the New England Aquarium in Boston. The decision to focus on freshwater environments was made during the planning process, as participants reasoned that it would be difficult to raise money for an aquarium offering conventional salt-water exhibits and that most people would be unlikely to travel to Chattanooga in order to visit one. The resulting structure is organized vertically, following the theme of water traveling through the Tennessee River system from the mountains to the sea. The two living forests, representing terrestrial habitats in Appalachia and the Mississippi Delta, are located at the top of the building and lit by skylights, while underwater habitats are viewed or accessed from the building's dimly lit, multi-story central "canyon". The building's exterior reinforces the focus of the exhibits with a series of 53 bas-relief depictions of the history of the Tennessee River valley set into the walls. In the surrounding plaza of Ross's Landing Park, variegated bands of plantings and paving represent a chronology of Chattanooga, with a stream flowing through the park to guide visitors through its history from its beginnings as a Cherokee settlement during the eighteenth and nineteenth centuries, facing towards the river, to the present, facing towards downtown Chattanooga.

Construction began in November 1988, and the aquarium opened to the public on May 1, 1992. Some observers were skeptical of the project, with local detractors describing it in terms like "Jack Lupton's fish tank" and some analysts questioning whether Chattanooga had fallen victim to a fad for public aquariums and overestimated the potential economic impact. However, it was successful from the beginning. The aquarium met its first-year goal of 650,000 visitors by the end of August 1992, and by the end of May 1993 more than 1.5 million people had visited.

=== Expansion ===
During the aquarium's early years, planners considered ways in which it could be used as a foundation for additional public projects with aquatic themes. In 1988 it was suggested that it could become the anchor of a complex that would also include a sports fishing trade center, potentially making Chattanooga the sports fishing capital of America. In 1993 SITE, one of the firms which had designed Ross's Landing Park, was asked by regional development authorities to design a center for exploration of other aspects of aquatic science and activity; its proposal, the "Aquatorium", included a museum, a conference center, and a spa. Neither of these ideas was developed.

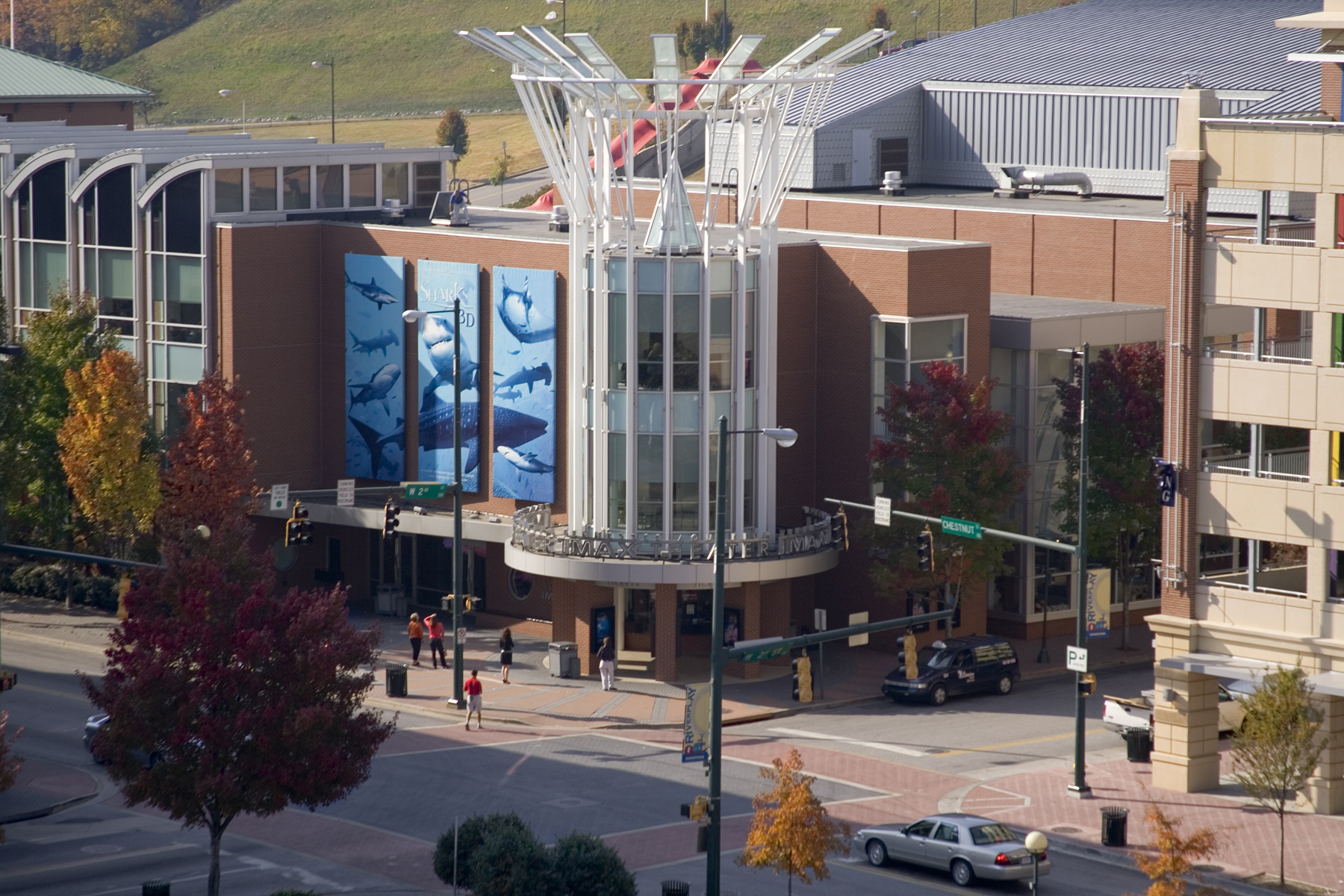
The Tennessee Aquarium IMAX theater adjacent to Ross's Landing Park

In 1995 the aquarium broke ground on a $14 million IMAX center on land adjacent to Ross's Landing Park, containing an educational facility and offices as well as the IMAX theater. This expansion opened in 1996. During its first decade the aquarium also focused on improving and refining its initial designs for the permanent exhibits, and presented two temporary exhibitions, "Jellies: Phantoms of the Deep" in 1998 and "VENOM: Striking Beauties" in 2000.

In 2002 Chattanooga undertook a new public planning process, the 21st Century Waterfront, to continue the reorientation towards the river that had begun with the Tennessee Riverpark Master Plan. An expansion for the aquarium was part of the resulting blueprint for $120 million in improvements to both sides of the downtown riverfront. Although the plan for Ocean Journey was announced a month after the developers of what would become the Georgia Aquarium in Atlanta, two hours away from Chattanooga, announced their choice of a building site, Tennessee Aquarium officials insisted that their own plans were not a response to this potential competition and that the addition of saltwater exhibits simply reflected visitor requests. However, by the early 2000s analysts were warning of an "aquarium glut" in the United States, after the number of accredited public aquariums in the country grew from 26 to 40 between 1993 and 2003 while the overall number of aquarium visitors rose by only 23% during a similar time frame.

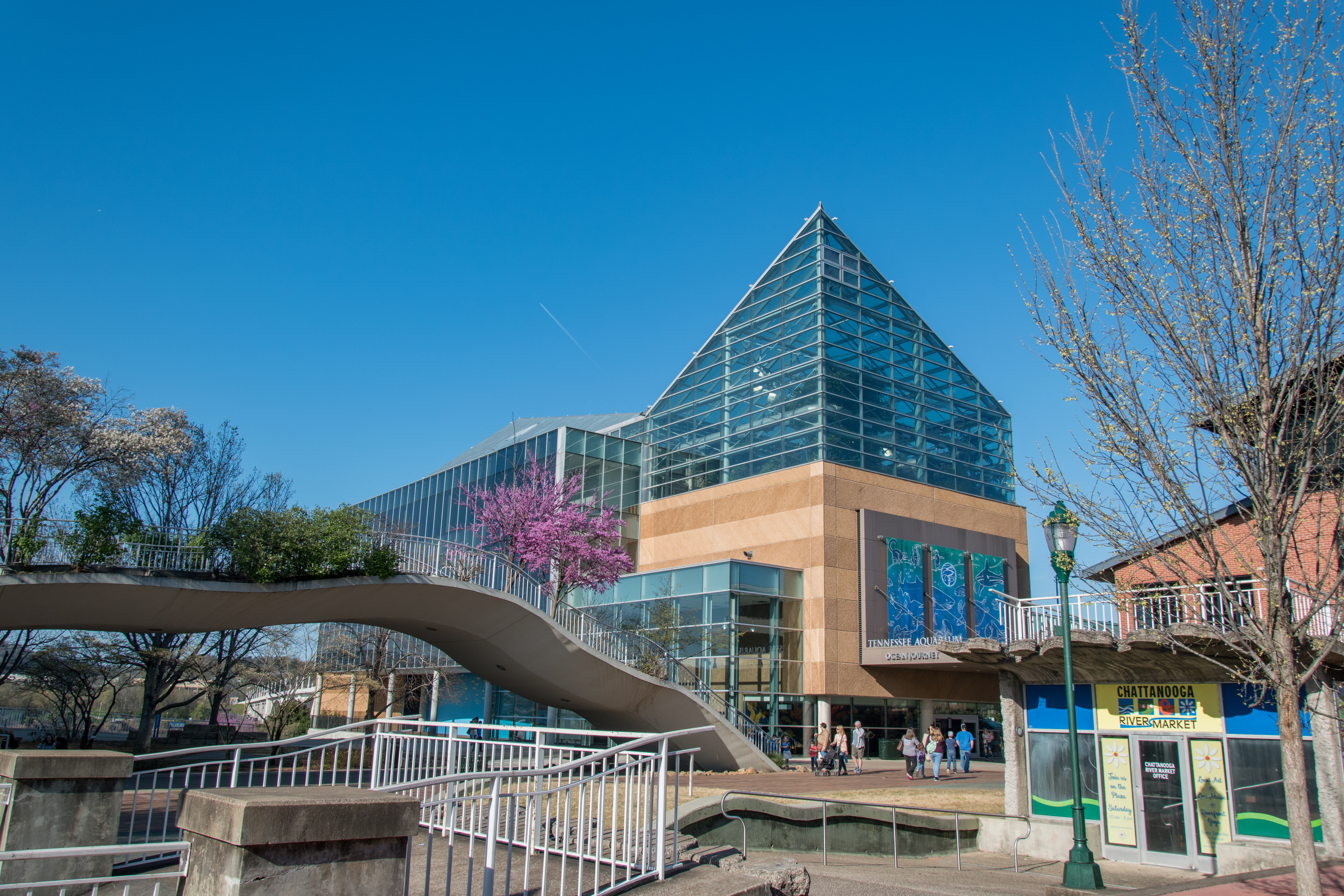
Ocean Journey

The aquarium raised the $30 million needed for its expansion through a combination of a $10 million bond issue and $20 million raised as part of the 21st Century Waterfront campaign, which included private donations, federal and state funds, and the proceeds of a hotel/parking tax. To design the new building and exhibits, the aquarium turned to the firm of Chermayeff, Sollogub and Poole, whose principal Peter Chermayeff designed River Journey as part of Cambridge Seven Associates. While the building's diverse exhibits departed from the Tennessee River theme of River Journey, its structure included a multi-story glass gallery designed to maintain visitors' connection to the river. Work began on the expansion on April 3, 2003, and Ocean Journey opened on April 29, 2005. The 21st Century Waterfront incorporated the new building with River Journey and Ross's Landing Park, continuing the theme of Chattanooga's early history by locating The Passage, an interactive public art installation marking the site of the beginning of the Trail of Tears in Chattanooga, alongside it.

=== Economic and community impact ===
The Tennessee Aquarium was the first element of Chattanooga's downtown revitalization plans to begin operation, preceding hotels, restaurants and entertainment venues. Community leaders credit it with beginning to improve residents' perceptions of the downtown and riverfront districts, as well as attracting tourist traffic. Initial estimates of the aquarium's economic impact predicted $750 million in direct and indirect contributions to the local economy; by 2012, more than $2 billion in additional investments had been made in Chattanooga's downtown, and the aquarium was widely acknowledged as the linchpin of this redevelopment process. A 2014 study done for the aquarium by the University of Tennessee Center for Sustainable Business and Development concluded that its annual economic impact is an estimated $101.3 million and over 1000 jobs overall.

During the initial planning process of the 1980s, the aquarium was also presented as a means by which Chattanooga could overcome the difficulties of its recent past. Planners hoped that as a project free of historic ties, the aquarium would be embraced by all parts of a community traditionally divided by race and by economic and social class. In the 1990s, development of a "world-class" aquarium was considered a sign of hope for the economically-depressed city and evidence of its ability to come together to create civic improvements. As downtown Chattanooga continues to develop, the city has emerged as an example of successful revitalization in older American urban areas; the aquarium is recognized as an example of the "Chattanooga Way", which relies on cooperation among the city, foundations and private enterprise, plus a high degree of public involvement, to complete significant projects in the community despite limited government resources. Viewed as part of Chattanooga's revitalization, however, its impact is disputed. Chattanooga remains a heavily segregated city, and some argue that the "placemaking" to which the aquarium contributes has exacerbated this problem.

== Conservation and research ==
Scientific research and conservation activities have been an integral part of the aquarium's work since it opened in 1992. Its research department was established in 1994. In addition, the aquarium's parent Tennessee Aquarium Corporation and board of trustees oversee a separate conservation initiative, the Tennessee Aquarium Conservation Institute.

=== Tennessee Aquarium Conservation Institute ===
In 1996 the aquarium founded a research and conservation arm, now known as the Tennessee Aquarium Conservation Institute (TNACI). Its mission is the protection of aquatic species and habitats in the southeastern United States. The TNACI was founded as the Southeastern Aquatic Research Institute (SARI), and was initially a joint venture between the Tennessee Aquarium, the University of Tennessee at Chattanooga, and the Tennessee River Gorge Trust. In 2002 it became the Tennessee Aquarium Research Institute (TNARI), and in 2011 was renamed as the Tennessee Aquarium Conservation Institute to emphasize its conservation mission. Between 1999 and 2011 the institute was housed at a site in Cohutta, Georgia. Since then, its workspace has been divided between its propagation facility in Cohutta, and other activities based at the aquarium in Chattanooga and its animal care facility. In October 2015 the TNACI announced that it will be building a new home, a facility which Institute director Anna George described as a "freshwater field station" for research and education, on the campus of Baylor School on the north shore of the Tennessee River. The $4.5 million project is expected to be completed in the fall of 2016.

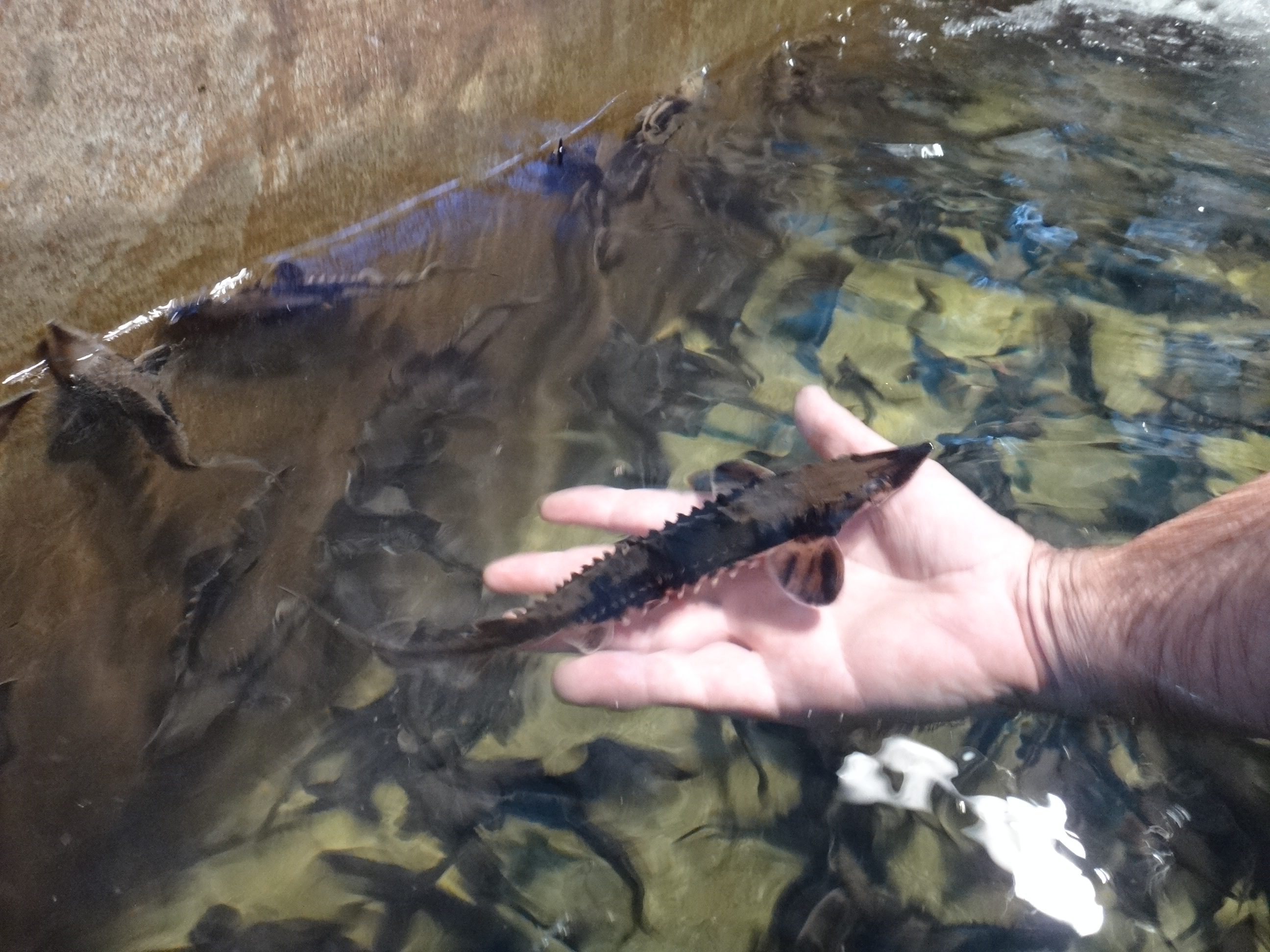
Lake sturgeon hatchlings awaiting release into the Tennessee River system by members of the Tennessee River Lake Sturgeon Working Group

The TNACI is focused on the restoration of freshwater ecosystems, including the study of water quality and the propagation and reintroduction of native aquatic species to southeastern waterways, and works in partnership with other conservation groups and agencies in Georgia and Tennessee. Since 2000, the TNACI has participated in the Tennessee River Lake Sturgeon Working Group, a program to restore the lake sturgeon to the Tennessee River Basin. In order to reestablish a self-sustaining population of sturgeon, which were declared extinct in the Tennessee River in 1961, the TNACI collects eggs from populations in the Great Lakes, hatches them in Georgia, and raises them at the Tennessee Aquarium until they are large enough to be released into the river. More than 180,000 sturgeon have been released as of October 2015, and sightings have been reported along the length of the Tennessee River between Knoxville, Tennessee, and Kentucky Lake. Some fish have been implanted with tracking devices, providing an additional means of monitoring the population; the trackers include acoustical devices detectable by receivers, including a mobile receiver aboard the River Gorge Explorer. The program is projected to continue until the oldest released fish have reached breeding age, an estimated 20 years in all.

The TNACI participates in the Barrens Topminnow Working Group, which works with property owners in the Barrens Plateau region of central Tennessee to restore 15 historic populations of this fish with the goal of preventing it from becoming an endangered species. In 2013 the TNACI began a program to reintroduce and monitor captive-raised southern Appalachian brook trout, which have suffered from the effects of climate change and competition from introduced species, in suitable rivers and streams. Other reintroduction efforts have included the restoration of eighteen species of native southeastern snails and mussels, including the Alabama moccasinshell mussel and the interrupted rocksnail, and the Conasauga logperch. The institute also participates in habitat restoration projects, including the restoration of the privately owned Colvard Spring near Dalton, Georgia, which provides habitat for the endangered coldwater darter.

Other TNACI projects include conservation genetics research on fish species, including the blue shiner, flame chub, laurel dace, and Conasauga logperch, and the development of the Freshwater Information Network (FIN), a database of current and historic locality information for 62 southeastern fish species in peril. In April 2016 the institute, working with the Tennessee Wildlife Resources Agency and Southeast Missouri State University, began an assessment of the alligator snapping turtle population in Tennessee.

=== Turtle conservation ===
The aquarium's collection of turtles and tortoises includes more than 500 individuals, representing more than 75 species. In 1993 Tennessee Aquarium researchers partnered with researchers from the University of Tennessee at Martin to undertake a three-year study of turtle populations in Reelfoot Lake, the first scientific assessment of turtles in that habitat. Its efforts to reintroduce native southeastern species include work with the yellow-blotched map turtle, which the aquarium has worked to restore to its natural habitat in the Pascagoula River system, and the bog turtle. The aquarium has participated in the Bog Turtle Headstart program, part of the Georgia Mountain Bog Enhancement Project, through captive breeding of the turtles.

The aquarium is working to conserve endangered Asian turtle species through captive breeding. Since 2011, its scientists have coordinated species survival plans for four turtle species, the keeled box turtle, the endangered spiny turtle, the endangered four-eyed turtle, and the critically endangered Arakan forest turtle. It is the only accredited zoo or aquarium in the United States to hatch another critically endangered southeast Asian species, the Beale's eyed turtle. The aquarium's collection of these turtles, which reached 20 individuals by 2015, has grown large enough to provide founding individuals for populations at other institutions, beginning with the Knoxville Zoo.

=== Breeding and propagation ===
In addition to its success in turtle breeding, the Tennessee Aquarium has successfully propagated a range of other species. Aquarists have hatched epaulette sharks and coral catsharks, as well as seahorses, jellyfish, stingrays and cuttlefish.

The aquarium has sent creatures born or hatched on site to other AZA-accredited institutions. Its gentoo and macaroni penguins began to breed in 2007, with four females born in 2015. In 2014 11 of the penguins born at the aquarium, nine gentoo and two macaroni, were sent to SeaWorld in San Diego, California, as part of the breeding loan agreement which initially brought penguins to the aquarium. In 2014 red piranhas hatched at the aquarium were sent to the Wonders of Wildlife aquarium and museum in Springfield, Missouri.

=== Conservation activities on display ===
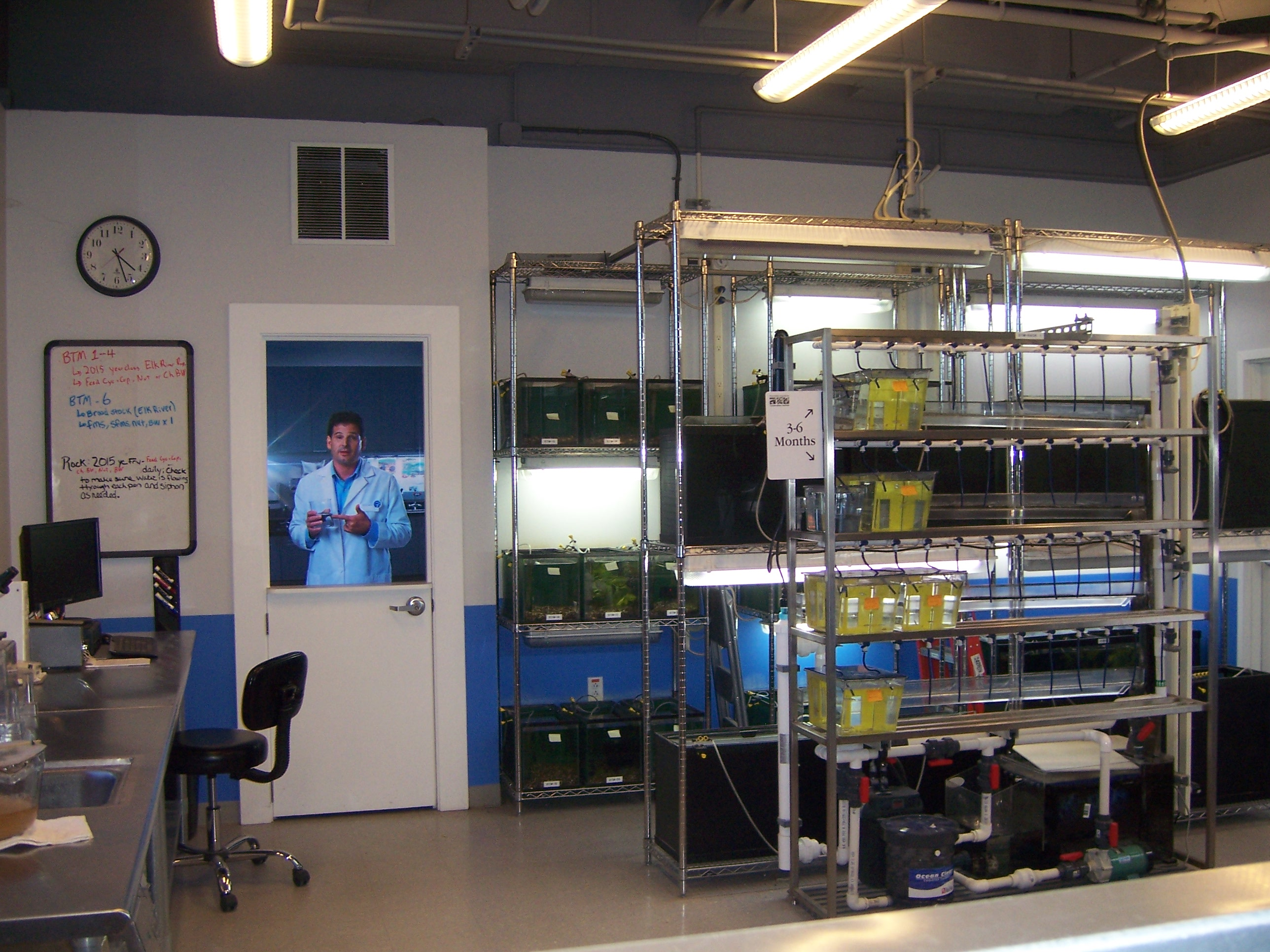
The Barrens Topminnow Lab in River Journey, a display that includes facilities for raising young topminnows as well as a video explaining the project

While much of the aquarium's and the TNACI's conservation work takes place away from public view, River Journey includes exhibits that highlight some of the species involved, including the "Barrens Topminnow Lab" display, which allows visitors to observe the topminnows as they are reared in captivity for reintroduction to the wild, a sturgeon touch tank, and the "Turtles: Nature's Living Sculptures" gallery, which includes hatchlings of endangered species born at the aquarium.

== Education and outreach ==
The Tennessee Aquarium and TNACI operate extensive education and outreach programs serving children, youth and adults. Since 2001, the Tennessee Aquarium has been accredited by the Southern Association of Colleges and Schools (SACS) as a special-purpose school. It is the only such school based in an aquarium. In 2009, the Tennessee Aquarium received the National Medal for Museum and Library Service from the Institute of Museum and Library Services, an award which recognizes "extraordinary and innovative approaches to public service, exceeding the expected levels of community outreach."

The aquarium provides educational programming, aligned to state curriculum standards, to students who visit the campus on field trips and through an outreach program available to schools and communities within 150 miles of its location. Its programs include free admission to the facility for more than 30,000 students annually. During 2015, in partnership with Tennessee Tech University, Tennessee Aquarium and TNACI educators developed a virtual reality program using the Oculus Rift system, which simulates the experience of snorkeling in a river for students who visit the aquarium and allows them to experience the impact of water pollution firsthand. The aquarium also offers a range of camps, workshops and other programming for children and teens, and internships and collaboration opportunities for college students. It has established an ongoing relationship with the Calvin Donaldson Environmental Science Academy, a Title 1 magnet elementary school located in the South Chattanooga neighborhood, offering the students a range of activities including field trips to the aquarium, field study programs, and an overnight camp-out experience.

The TNACI includes school groups in the release of lake sturgeon and other species into local rivers, and since 2012 it has offered a week-long summer program, CLAW (Conservation Leadership in Action Week) Camp, for high school students. The institute also offers internships for college students and graduates, and works with graduate students. In 2014, over 300 students studied with the TNACI.

Aquarium outreach programs include the community as a whole. A notable example is the Serve & Protect program, which educates the public about sustainable seafood. It was established in 2011 in partnership with chef and television personality Alton Brown, an advocate of sustainable fisheries, who visited Chattanooga for events in 2011 and 2012. Serve & Protect activities, including cooking demonstrations, cook-offs and dinners, are designed to encourage visitors and participants to consume sustainable seafood such as catfish, squid, Arctic char and summer flounder, as a way of removing pressure from threatened fisheries. The aquarium also participates in the AZA's SAFE (Saving Animals From Extinction) program, focusing on shark conservation.

== Gallery ==
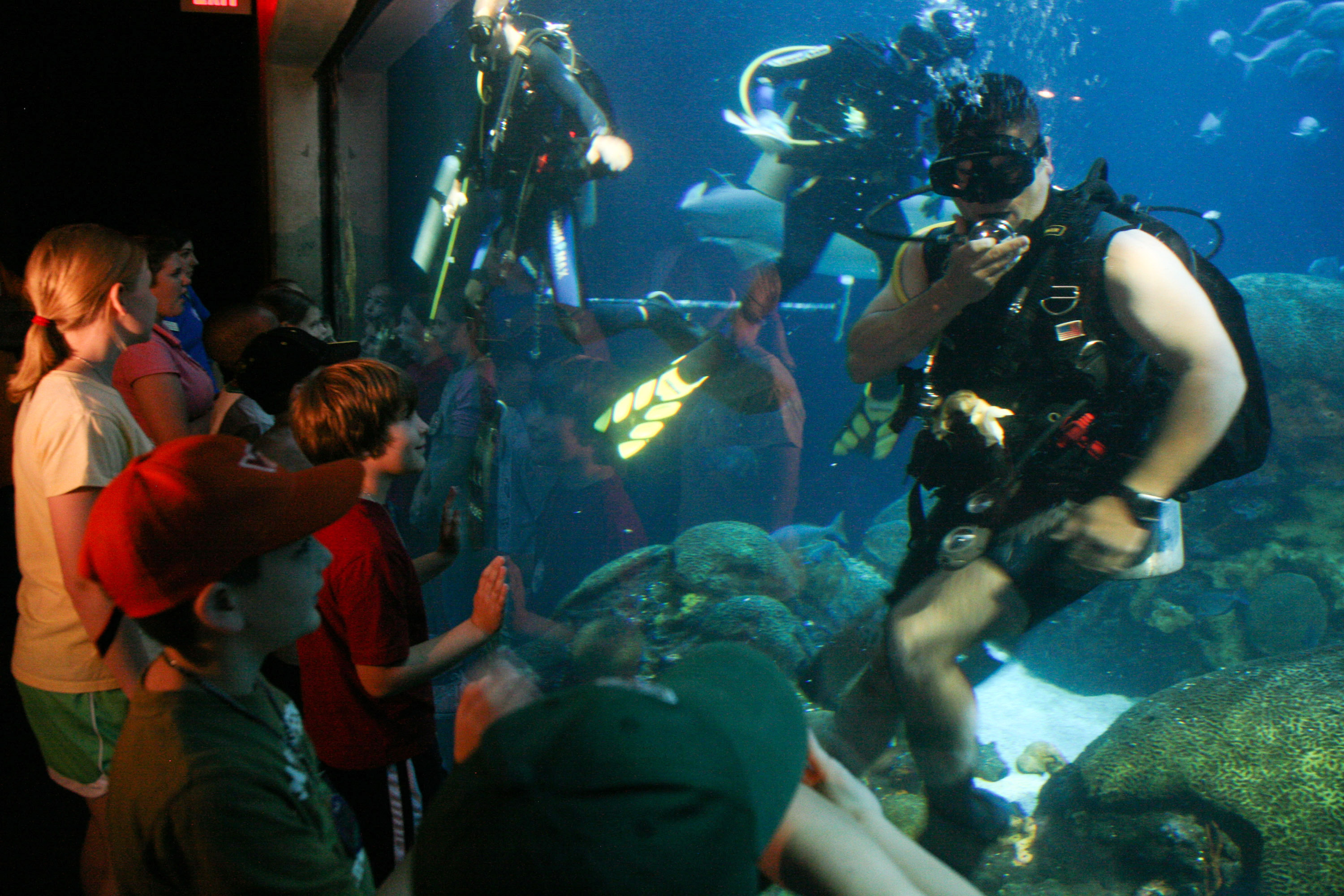
Divers in one of the aquariums.

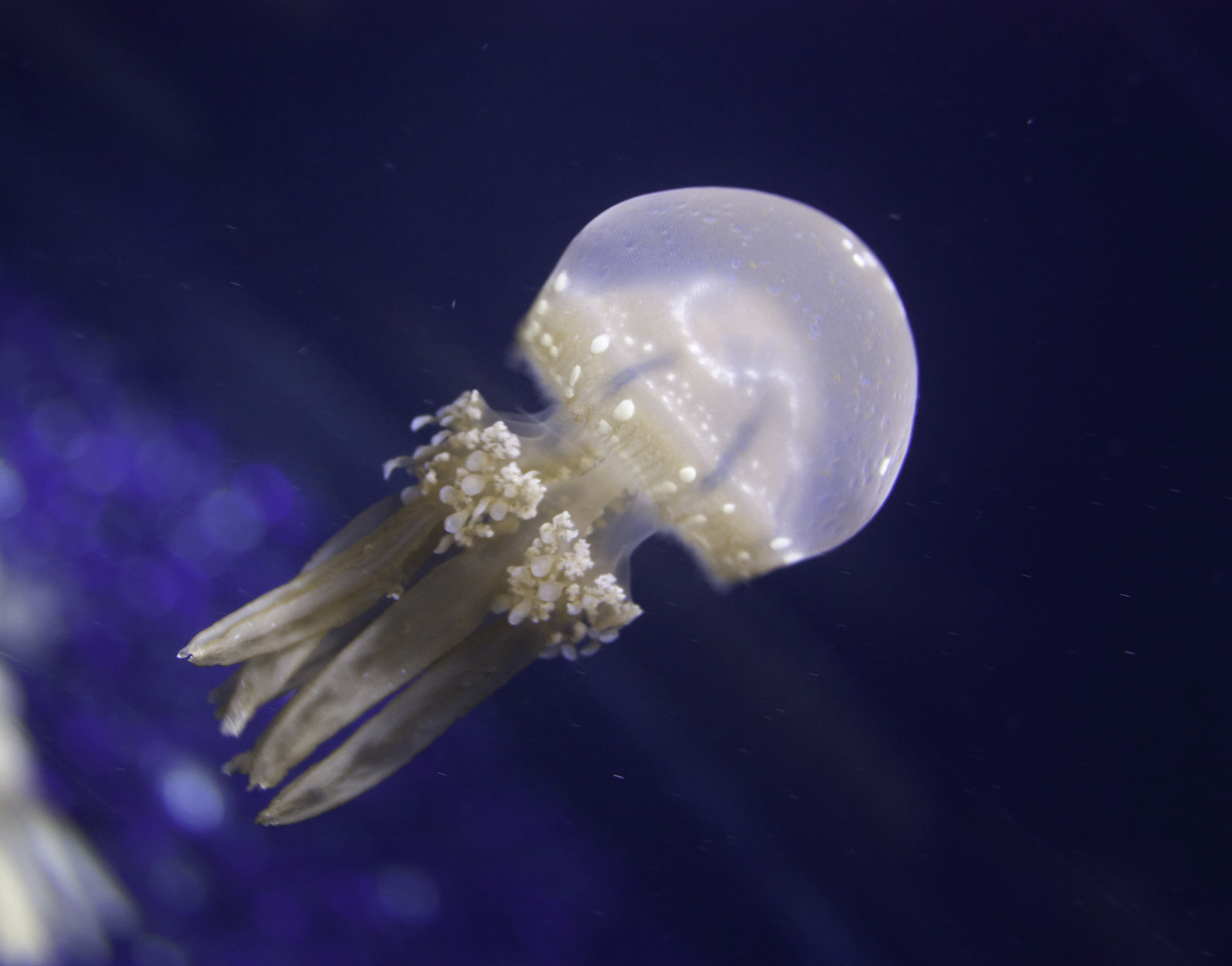
Sea jelly.

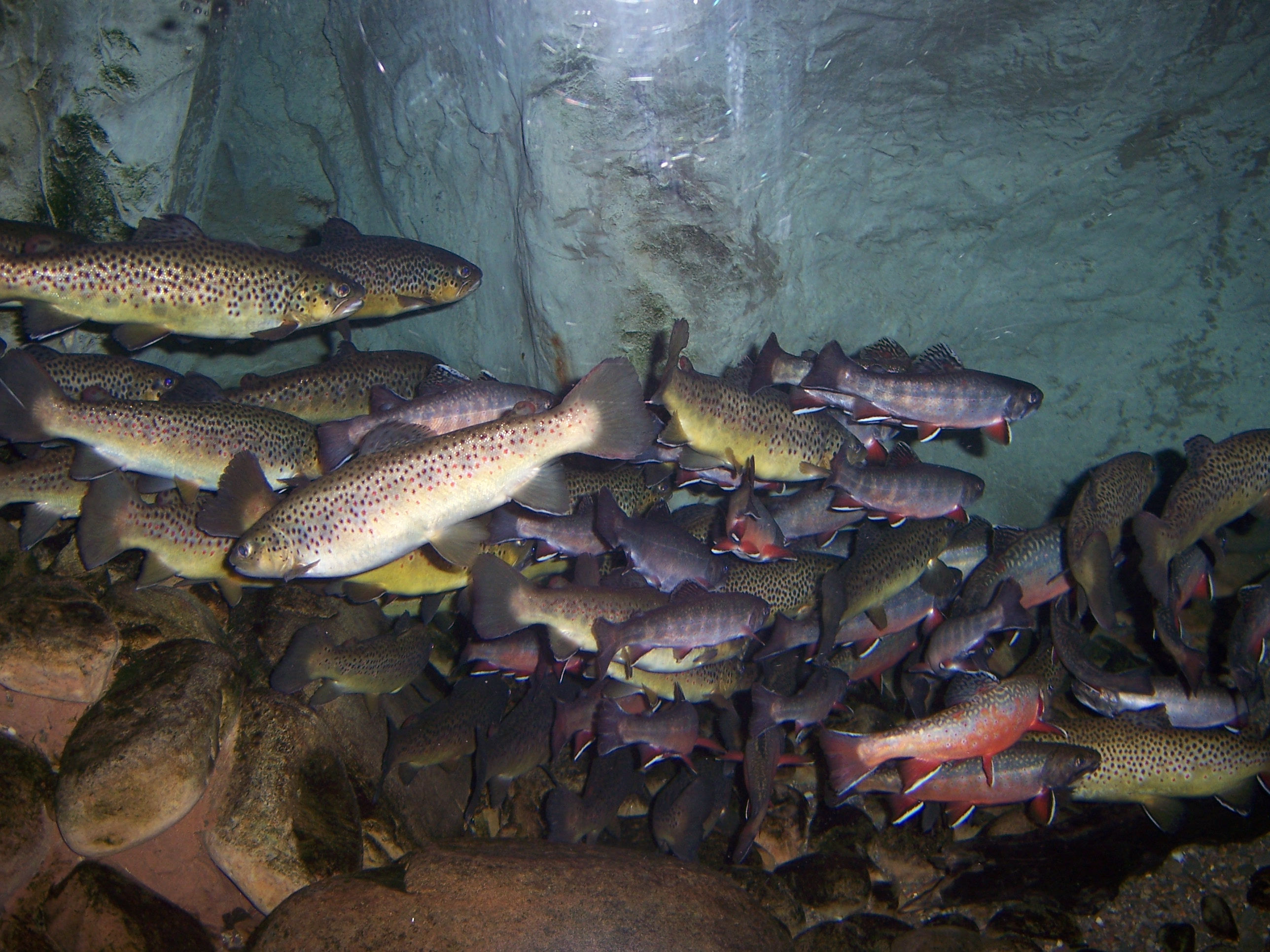
Brook trout, brown trout and rainbow trout on exhibit in River Journey.

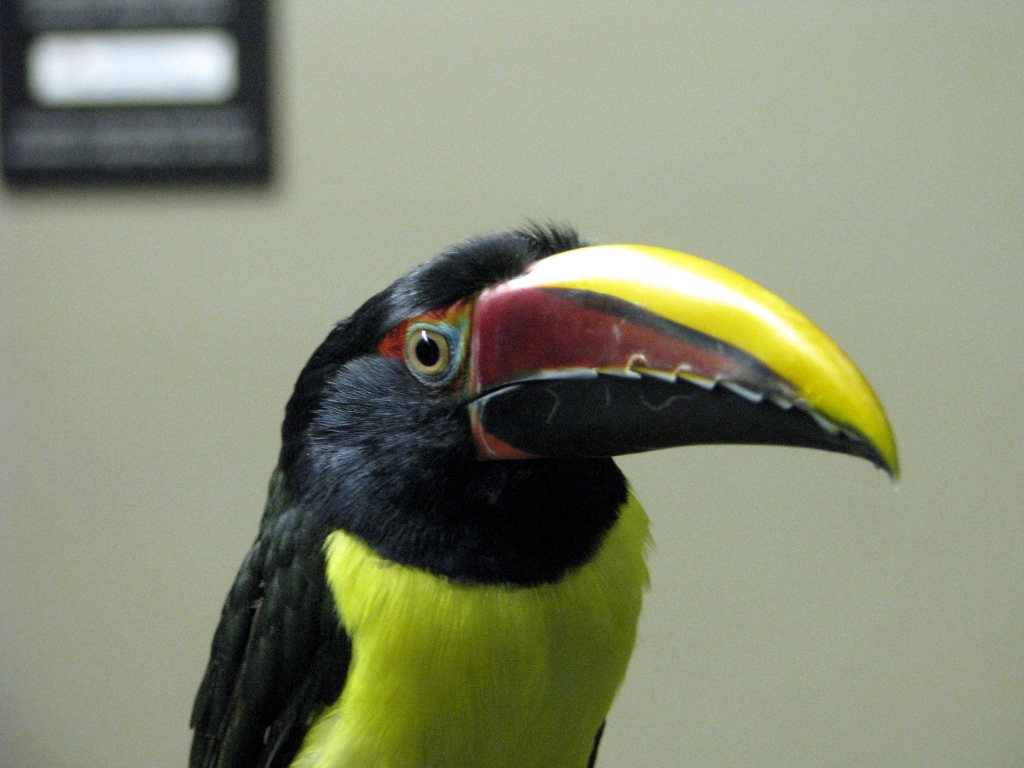
Green aracari (Pteroglossus viridis)

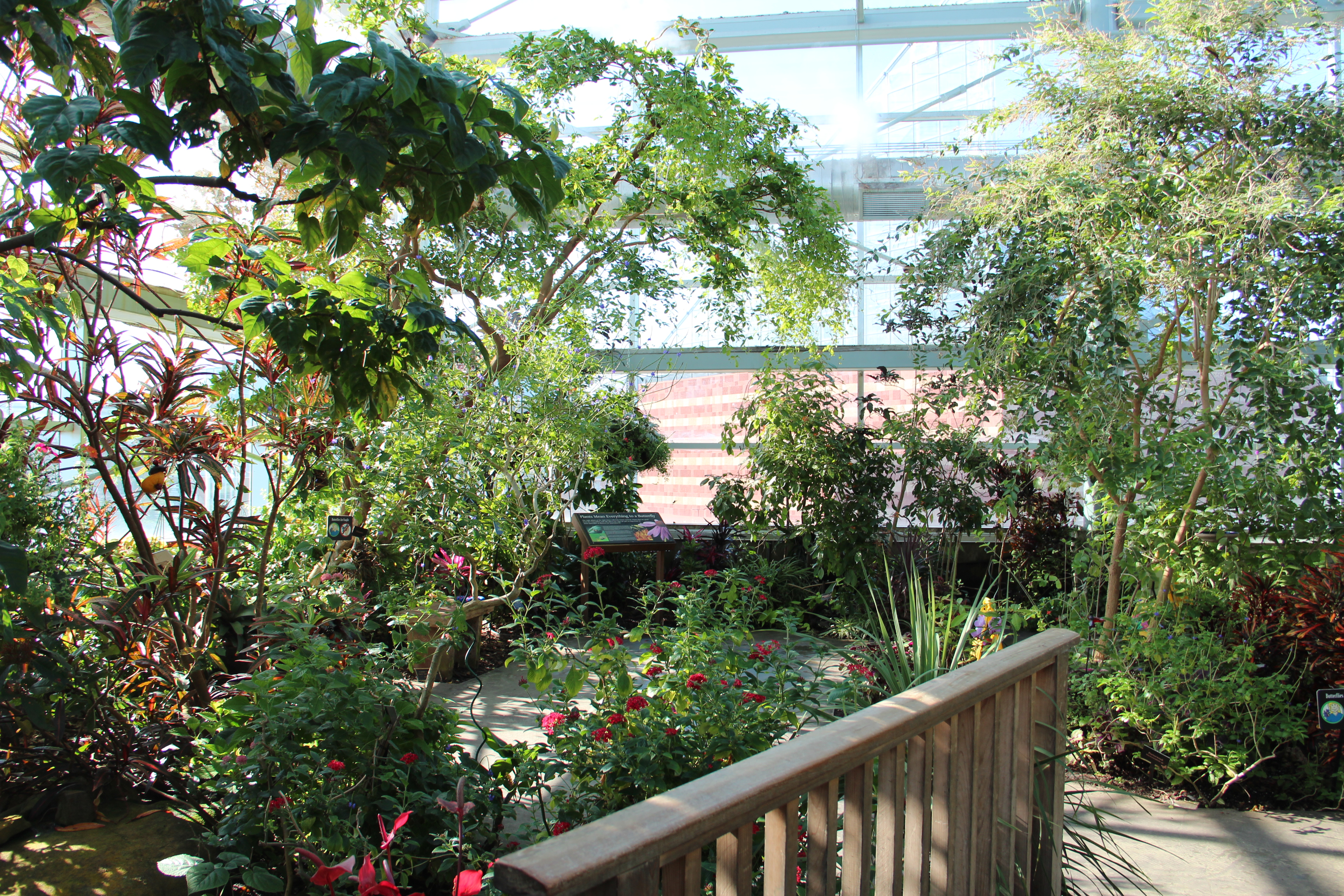
Butterfly garden.
