= Lettie Pate Whitehead Evans =

American businesswoman (1872–1953)

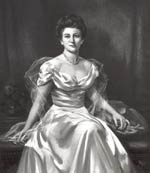
- Born: Letitia Pate; February 21, 1872; Bedford County, Virginia
- Died: November 14, 1953 (aged 81); Hot Springs, Virginia
- Spouses: Joseph Brown Whitehead (m. 1895; died 1906) Arthur Kelly Evans (after 1913)
- Children: Joseph Brown Whitehead Jr. Conkey Pate Whitehead
- Parent(s): Cornelius Pate; Elizabeth Stagg Pate

Letitia "Lettie" Pate Whitehead Evans (February 21, 1872, in Bedford County, Virginia – November 14, 1953, in Hot Springs, Virginia) was an American businesswoman and philanthropist. She was the first woman to be on Coca-Cola's board of directors.

== Early life ==
Evans was born in Bedford County, Virginia to Cornelius Pate and Elizabeth Stagg Pate.

== Personal life ==
She married Joseph Brown Whitehead, an attorney, in 1895, and the couple moved to Chattanooga shortly thereafter. They had two sons, Joseph Brown Whitehead Jr., and Conkey Pate Whitehead.

The Whiteheads' successful business careers began in 1899, when Joseph Whitehead and an associate approached The Coca-Cola Company with the idea of bottling their beverages. The company granted Joseph Whitehead and his associate an exclusive contract. The Whitehead family moved to Atlanta in 1903 in order to expand their thriving bottling business. Lettie and Joseph Whitehead soon became business and community leaders in the area.

In 1906, Joseph Brown Whitehead unexpectedly died from pneumonia while on a trip visiting Evans's parents. Evans, age 34 and with two young sons (Joseph Jr. and Conkey), immediately took over the family's business affairs and real estate assets. She assumed leadership of the Whitehead Holding Company and Whitehead Realty Company, and actively managed the bottling operation (then 80 plants), eventually with her sons' assistance.

=== Second marriage ===
Evans remarried to Colonel Arthur Kelly Evans, a retired Canadian Army officer, in 1913. They made their home in Hot Springs, Virginia.

In 1919, the Woodruff family purchased Coca-Cola from Asa Candler, and Robert Woodruff as its president came to work closely with Evans, who had been president of the bottling company since she was 36. In 1934, Evans sold the bottling operation (which by then had grown to over 1,000 bottling plants) back to the Coca-Cola Company in exchange for stock. She was appointed to the Coca-Cola Company's Board of Directors. She was one of the first women to serve on the board of directors for any major American corporation, and remained on the board for more than two decades.

=== Philanthropy ===
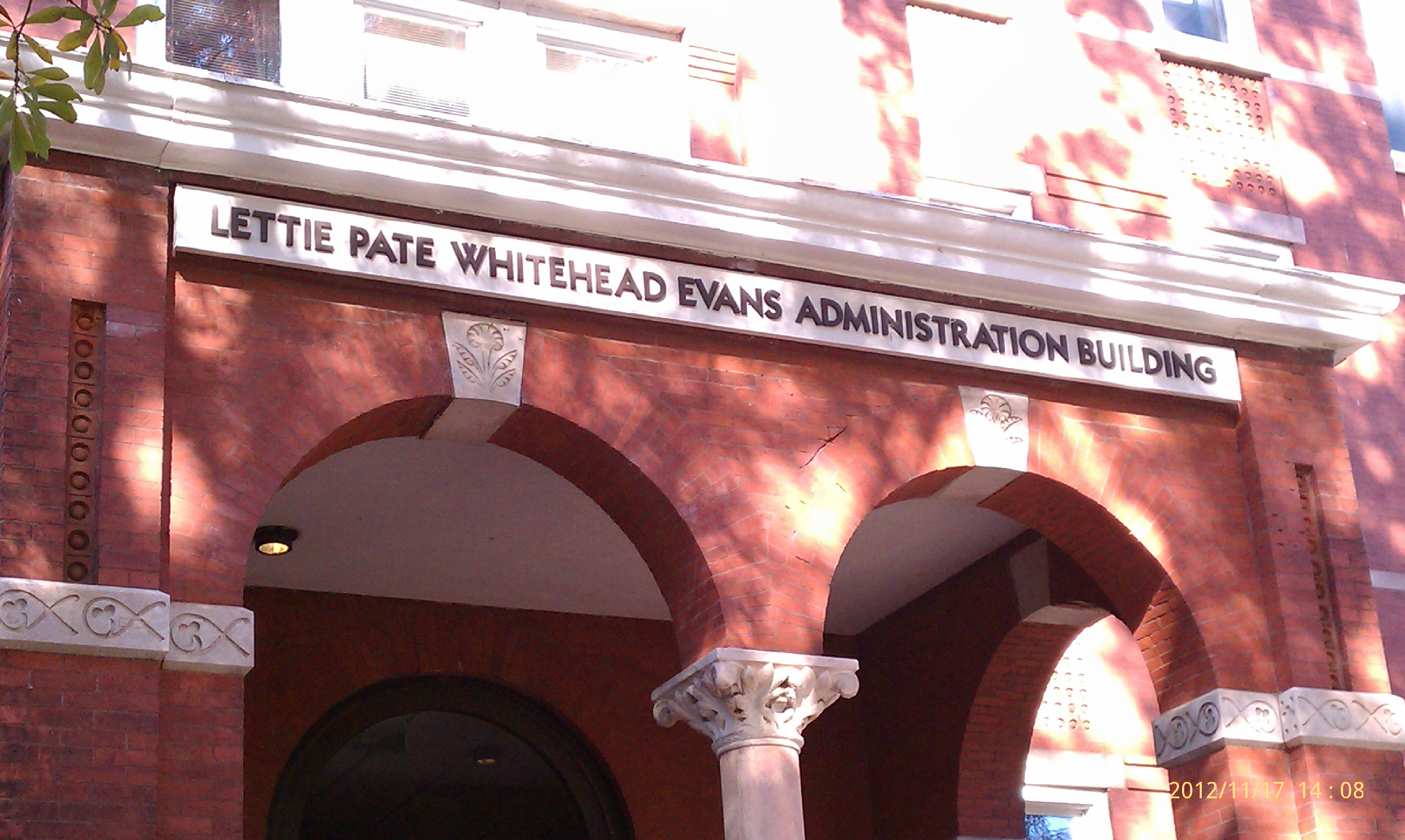
Lettie Pate Whitehead Evans Administration Building

Evans donated millions of dollars to more than 130 different organizations during her lifetime, particularly in Virginia and Georgia. Since her sons were financially well off, in 1945 she established the Lettie Pate Evans Foundation, which received her entire estate upon her death eight years later. Thus, between donations in her lifetime and those of the foundation, charitable organizations have received over a billion dollars under her auspices. In 2025, the foundation had $4.2 billions in net assets.

Evans was a devout Episcopalian, and gave generously to the Diocese of Southwestern Virginia which was formed in 1919 and encompassed both her hometown and residence after her sons were grown. She also donated generously to the Virginia Theological Seminary which in 1998 established an award to honor lay church leaders in her name.

Evans served as a trustee of Emory University, Agnes Scott College, the Virginia Museum of Fine Arts and the American Hospital of Paris. She donated significantly to the Georgia Institute of Technology (whose administration building shown above is named for her), as well as Berry College, the College of William and Mary, Washington and Lee University, and Bruton Parish in Williamsburg and many other educational and religious institutions.

=== Legacy ===
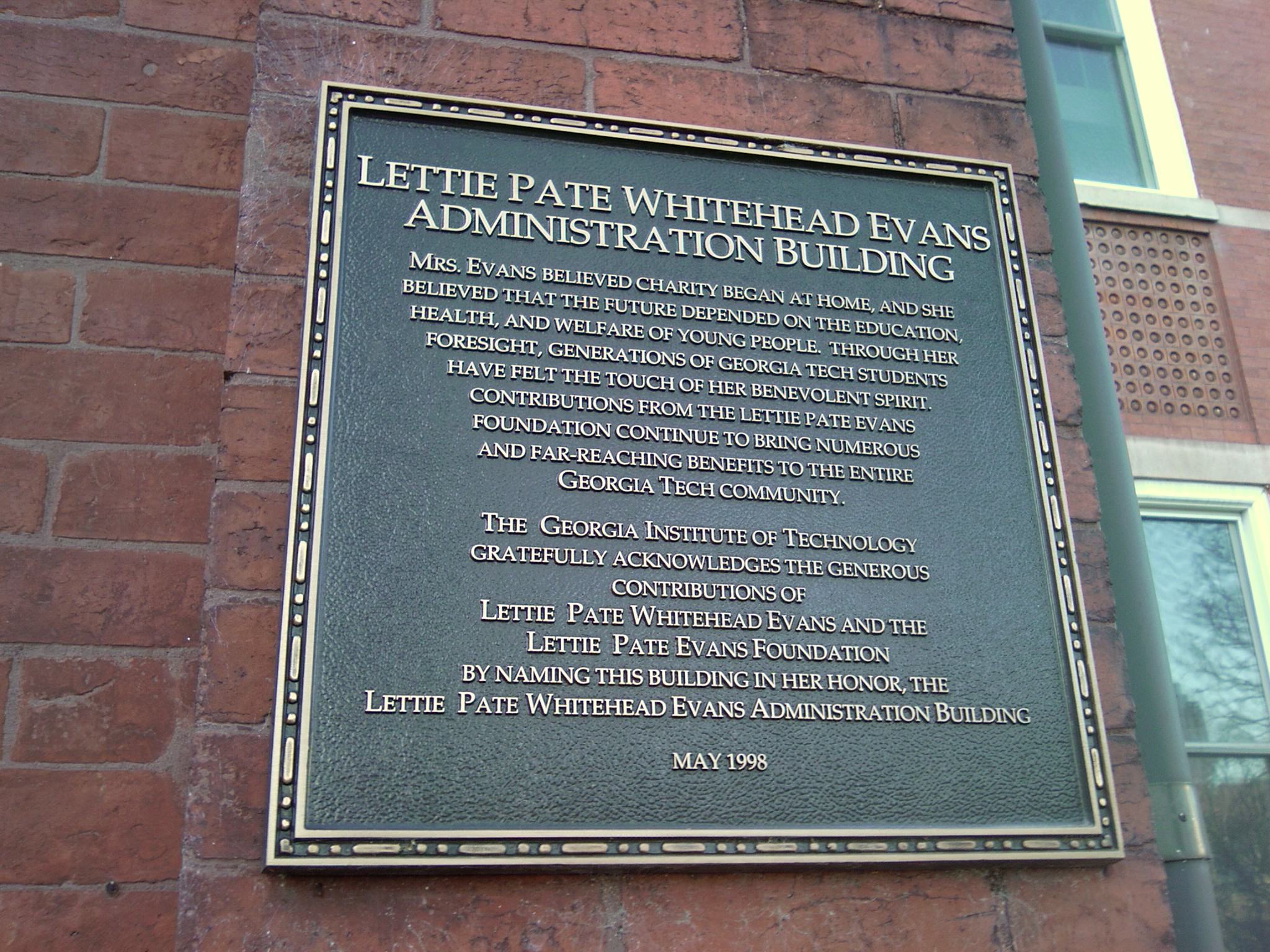
A plaque near the front doors of Tech Tower describes the building's eponymous benefactor.

Evans survived both her husbands and her two sons. In memorial upon her death the Coca-Cola Board noted that "Endowed with material things, she had a conviction that she held them as trustee for the poor, the meek and the unfortunate." Her oldest son, influenced by Evans's generosity, created the Joseph B. Whitehead Foundation as a memorial to his father. A special collection in the Robert W. Woodruff Library at Emory University holds many of Evans's papers and writings. Several academic buildings are named in her honor, including the Lettie Pate Whitehead Evans Administration Building at Georgia Tech, the Lettie Pate Whitehead Evans Hall and Evans School of Humanities and Social Sciences at Berry College, the Lettie Pate Whitehead Evans Graduate Housing Complex at the College of William and Mary, the Lettie Pate Whitehead Evans Residence Hall at Emory University, and the Lettie Pate Whitehead Evans Dining Hall at Agnes Scott College.

The building of a central office for the Episcopal Diocese of Southwestern Virginia, known as Evans Diocesan House, was made possible by a gift from Evans, then a member of St. Luke's Episcopal Church in Hot Springs, Virginia. Later renovations were also supported by the Lettie Pate Evans Foundation. Her portrait continues to hang in the reception area of the building, located in Roanoke, Virginia.

Her home near Hot Springs, Virginia, Malvern Hall, was added to the National Register of Historic Places in 2013.

== See also ==
- Tech Tower
