= Zeboim Cartter Patten =

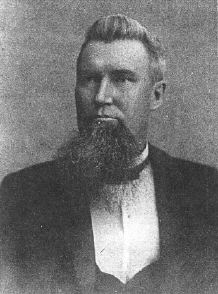
- Born: May 3, 1840; Wilna, New York
- Died: March 20, 1925 (aged 84); Flintstone, Georgia
- Occupation(s): Industrialist and Capitalist

Zeboim Cartter Patten (May 3, 1840 – March 20, 1925) was an American industrialist, capitalist, and American Civil War captain. He was born in Wilna, New York, lived in Chattanooga, Tennessee and founded the Volunteer Life Insurance Company (now the Lincoln Financial Group), The Stone Fort Land Company (bought by Bob Corker in 1999), The T.H. Payne Company, and most notably the Chattanooga Medicine Company in 1879 which is now called Chattem.

== See also ==
- Chattem
- John Thomas Lupton
