= Lyndhurst Foundation =

- Formation: 1938
- Type: Grant-making foundation
- Headquarters: Chattanooga, TN, United States
- President: Benic M. Clark III
- Revenue: $7,969,749 (2015)
- Expenses: $5,749,965 (2015)
- Website: www.lyndhurstfoundation.org

The Lyndhurst Foundation is a Chattanooga, Tennessee-based grant-making foundation organized in 1938 by Coca-Cola Bottling Company magnate Cartter Lupton. The Lyndhurst Foundation was the first private foundation in Tennessee, and it focuses on the enrichment and enhancement of the social, natural, and built environment in Chattanooga, Tennessee, and the surrounding southeastern region.

== History ==
The Lyndhurst Foundation began in 1938 as the Memorial Welfare Foundation with Cartter Lupton as its president. Cartter Lupton established the Memorial Welfare Foundation to carry out his charitable endeavors. The Lyndhurst endowment originates from Lupton family's success in building the Coca-Cola Bottling Company with other Chattanooga businessmen, Ben F. Thomas and Joseph Brown Whitehead. During the early stages of the Memorial Welfare Foundation, its main focus was to benefit primary health care and cultural activities in and around the city of Chattanooga.

Upon the death of Cartter Lupton in 1977, his son Jack Lupton became the president. Jack Lupton then changed the named of the Memorial Welfare Foundation to The Lyndhurst Foundation, which was named for the family mansion of the same name built by his grandfather John Thomas Lupton. With the death of its founder, Cartter Lupton, the Lyndhurst foundation began to redirect its fundings towards enhancing the Chattanooga community by way of education, art, and the revitalization of the riverfront.

In 1992, Jack Lupton retired from the Lyndhurst Foundation board, and his children and nephews were elected as trustees to lead the foundation. In 2012, Lyndhurst spun off five new smaller family foundations. The legacy Lyndhurst Foundation is now governed by a board of trustees who come from different backgrounds in business, art, and health-care. The current board includes five grandchildren of the founder. The goal of this 10-member board of community leaders is to bring about a new era of charitable giving to Chattanooga and its surrounding community.

== Philanthropy ==
The Lyndhurst Foundation has played a major role in the revitalization process of Chattanooga's downtown and riverfront as a result of the city's decline due to water and air pollution. In 1995 the foundation gave $2.5 million towards a citywide planning process. As part of the revitalization process, Lyndhurst Foundation chairman Jack Lupton donated $11 million of his own funds along with $10 million from the foundation itself to building the Tennessee Aquarium. In 1992, the aquarium opened as the world's largest freshwater aquarium and brought new tourism to the city.

The Lyndhurst foundation has given several donations to improve education in the Hamilton County area. Lyndhurst was a founding member of the Public Education Foundation, an organization that strives to strengthen Chattanooga's public schools. Many of these donations have been received by the local University of Tennessee Chattanooga. Lyndhurst has further developed education in Chattanooga by funding two new public elementary schools in the downtown area, Tommie F. Brown and Herman H. Battle Academy. The foundation also contributed the funding of the Creative Discovery Museum, a children's museum which provides hands-on education activities, in downtown Chattanooga.

In 1996 the foundation's grant of $10,000,000 effectively saved Double Take magazine, until they closed their doors in 2005. This gift is considered one of the largest gifts to an American publication.

In 2007, the foundation launched CreateHere, a program focused on economic development and the attraction and retention of individuals associated with the creative class. Over the past eight years, Lyndhurst has donated over two million dollars to help the program evolve. Lyndhurst has further focused on economic development in Chattanooga with the creation of the River City Company, a non-profit organization that creates public spaces in the downtown area.
