= Thomas Cartter Lupton =

American businessman

Thomas Cartter Lupton (1899–1977) was an American businessman.

== Biography ==
=== Early life ===
He was the only child of John Thomas Lupton, founder of the Dixie Coca-Cola Bottling Company, and Elizabeth Patten.

=== Philanthropy ===
A philanthropist, he founded the Lyndhurst Foundation, formerly known as The Memorial Welfare Foundation. The Lupton Library at the University of Tennessee at Chattanooga is named for him and his wife.

=== Personal life ===
He was married to Margaret Rawlings Lupton. They had a son, John T. Lupton II. They lived in Chattanooga, Tennessee. Unlike his father or son, he was known for being a recluse. The neighborhood Lupton City is named after him.

At the time of his death, his $200 million (USD) estate was the largest ever probated in the South.
