= Devin Galligan =

M. Devin Galligan (March 15, 1972 – December 27, 2003) was the founder of the charitable organization "Strain the Brain" which was founded to raise money for cancer patients at Vanderbilt University Medical Center. He later succumbed to that disease.

He was a 1990 graduate of the Baylor School in Chattanooga, Tennessee. He attended Hampden-Sydney College, but did not graduate. He received his B.A. from Fordham University in 1994. After graduation, he was a teacher in the New York City School system. He returned to Nashville after a couple of years in New York and was employed by the State Street Bank & Trust Company.

He served at Vanderbilt University Medical Center as a volunteer counselor after having a carcinoma removed from his brain in December 1996. The Reporter, a magazine of VUMC described the procedure as an "awake craniotomy". As they describe it, it is a "procedure [that] is a special form of brain mapping surgery paired with sophisticated anesthesiology techniques. The patient is in a deep sleep during the first phase, but is awakened later during the surgery to perform a series of tests to help guide surgeons through the rugged pathways of the brain."

After his surgery, he began training for triathlons and iron man contests. He was one of the carriers of the Olympic Torch for the 1996 Summer Olympics in Atlanta.

He was married to Kristi Moore Galligan on February 14, 1998. They had two children together: Izaak Pontius Galligan (11/24/1996) and Alexander Devin Galligan (10/05/2001).
