= Wendell Rawls Jr. =

American journalist

Wendell Lee Rawls Jr. (born August 18, 1941, in Goodlettsville, Tennessee) is a Pulitzer Prize-winning investigative reporter and editor. His career spans 40 years in journalism and media, beginning in 1967 at The (Nashville) Tennessean.

== Life ==
Raised in the Nashville, Tennessee, area and in Red Bank, Tennessee, Rawls is a graduate of Baylor School in Chattanooga, Tennessee, and Vanderbilt University. He is often known by the nickname "Sonny."

Rawls was the first national correspondent at The Philadelphia Inquirer (where he won the Pulitzer Prize for Investigative Reporting in 1977); was a Washington correspondent and then Southern Bureau chief for The New York Times; and assistant managing editor for news at The Atlanta Journal-Constitution. He also won the National Headliner Award for Outstanding Public Service, the Robert F. Kennedy Journalism Award Grand Prize, the Heywood Broun Journalism Award, and several other awards. While he was an editor in Atlanta, his staff produced a Pulitzer Prize winner, and four additional Pulitzer Prize finalists in two years.

In 2005, he became managing director of the Center for Public Integrity, an investigative nonprofit organization in Washington, D.C., and in May 2006 became its executive director before returning to teaching.

Rawls was a professor in the School of Journalism at Middle Tennessee State University from 2000 until his retirement in 2015, and occupied the Seigenthaler Chair of Excellence in First Amendment Studies at MTSU in 2001. In 2009, he taught at Vanderbilt University, and in 2016 was inducted into the Vanderbilt Student Media Hall of Fame.

He has written for magazines, motion pictures and episodic television (Law & Order), and produced several television movies.

== Works ==
- Cold Storage, Simon and Schuster, 1980, ISBN 978-0-671-24287-9
