= William E. Duff =

American counterintelligence specialist

William Duff is the American author of the 1999 book A Time for Spies: Theodore Stephanovich Mally and the Era of the Great Illegals.

He is a former FBI counterintelligence specialist. He is a graduate of University of the South and Baylor School.
