= Lupton City, Chattanooga =

Lupton City, Tennessee
- Neighborhood
- Location within Tennessee
- Coordinates: 35°06′20″N 85°15′51″W
- Country: United States
- State: Tennessee
- County: Hamilton
- Elevation: 794 ft (242 m)
- Time zone: UTC-5 (Eastern (EST))
  - Summer (DST): UTC-4 (EDT)
- ZIP code: 37351
- Area code: 423
- GNIS feature ID: 1292293

Lupton City is a neighborhood of Chattanooga, Tennessee, United States. The community developed in the 1920s as a mill town, a planned community that contained the Dixie Spinning Mills thread mill and housing for its workers.

== History ==
Chattanooga businessman John T. Lupton established the Dixie Mercerizing Company around 1920 to manufacture thread using the mercerizing process, which had been introduced in 1913. The company built its thread-spinning facility and the adjoining housing area on a 1,000-acre (400 ha) tract north of the Tennessee River, outside the city limits of Chattanooga. In 1923, when production began, the spinning mill had 12,000 spindles; by 1925 there were 30,000 spindles.

Lupton City provided modern worker housing near the mill, as well as community services such as a school, post office, and church, and amenities such as concrete sidewalks, a gym, a movie theater, and a swimming pool. Medical care was available from a doctor and dentist employed by the company. By 1929, Lupton City had 200 homes.

For most of its history, Lupton City had a post office. Homes in the community did not have mailboxes or residential delivery, so residents picked up their mail at the post office, which used ZIP code 37351. In 2006 the post office was closed temporarily due to structural problems with the building that housed it, and residents were instructed to get their mail at the Hixson post office. The U.S. Postal Service and the building owner provided money to the city of Chattanooga to buy mailboxes for Lupton City postal customers, and the post office closed permanently on July 18, 2009.

Lupton City is now part of the city of Chattanooga. They still keep some of their independence by continuing to be called Lupton City and use the zip code 37351. The yarn mill no longer operates in the community as Dixie Yarns, and has been torn down. All that remain are the bricks of the mill. The City of Chattanooga has taken over the space of the former plant. The bricks are no longer there and they and have planted a meadow with native plant and flower species for residents to use beginning sometime in 2025-2026.
