= Dixie Coca-Cola Bottling Company Plant =

Historic bottling plant in Atlanta, Georgia, US

- Dixie Coca–Cola Bottling Company Plant
- U.S. National Register of Historic Places
- U.S. National Historic Landmark
- Atlanta Landmark Building
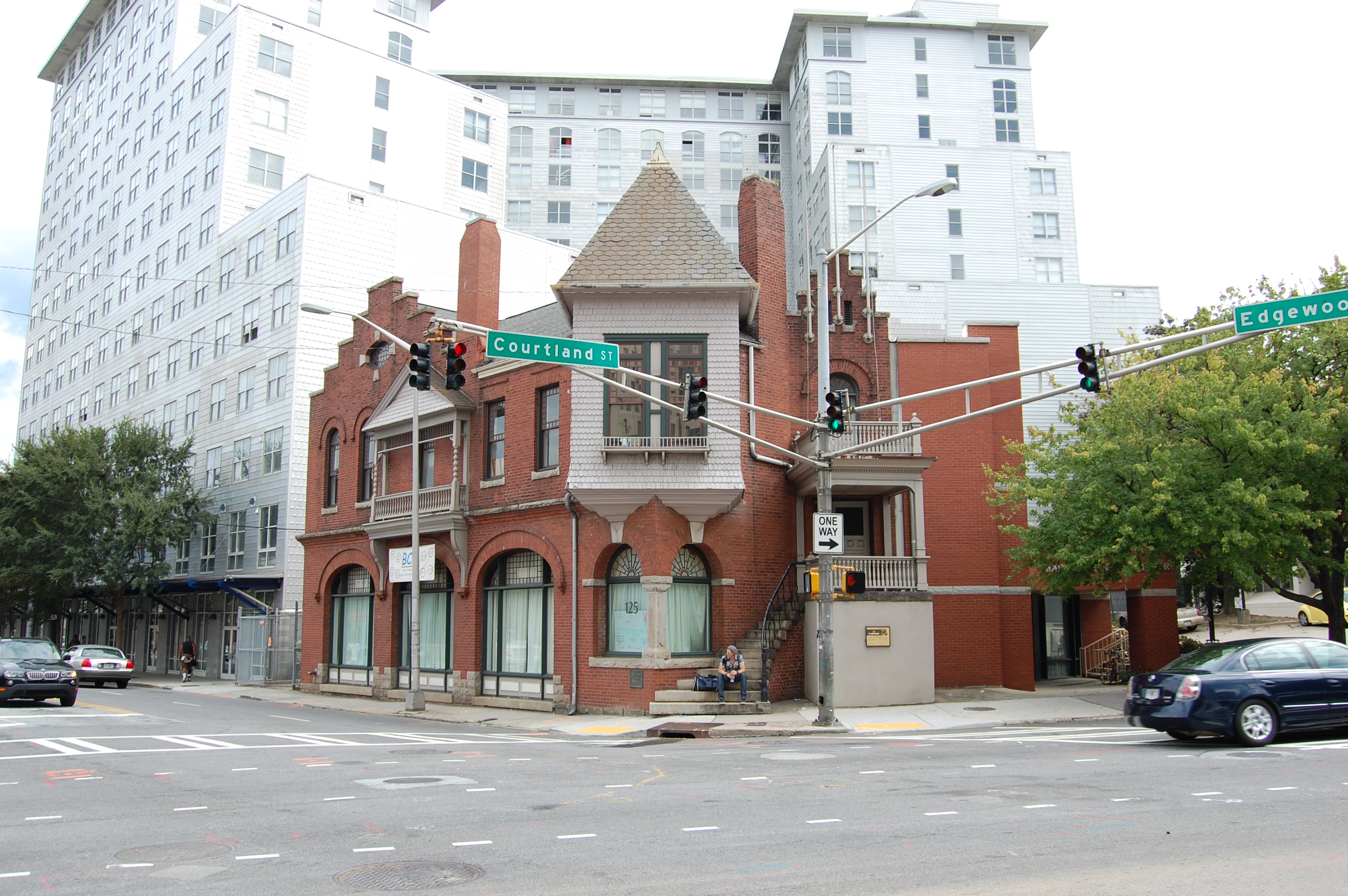

- Location within Atlanta Location within Georgia Location within the United States
- Location: 125 Edgewood Avenue, Atlanta, Georgia
- Coordinates: 33°45′15.67″N 84°23′3.06″W
- Built: 1900
- NRHP reference No.: 77000428

Significant dates
- Added to NRHP: July 20, 1977
- Designated NHL: May 4, 1983
- Designated ALB: October 23, 1989

The Dixie Coca-Cola Bottling Company Plant, also known as Baptist Student Center, or Baptist Collegiate Ministry at Georgia State University, is a historic building at 125 Edgewood Avenue in Atlanta, Georgia. Built in 1891, it was the headquarters and bottling plant of the Dixie Coca-Cola Bottling Company, and the place where the transition from Coca-Cola as a drink served at a soda fountain to a mass-marketed bottled soft drink took place. It was declared a National Historic Landmark in 1983, and is one of the only buildings in Atlanta dating to Coca-Cola's early history. From 1966 to 2024 the building served as the Baptist Student Ministry location for Georgia State University.

== Description and history ==
The former Dixie Coca-Cola building is located in downtown Atlanta, at the southeast corner of Edgewood Avenue and Courtland Street. It is a relatively small two-story structure, mostly built out of brick, with a projecting wood-frame clapboarded square turret at the corner. The building is irregularly shaped, due in part to the unusual lot on which it stands. Its Edgewood Avenue facade has three large arched windows on the first floor, and Queen Anne-style variety of shapes defining its roof line at and above the second level.

The building was built in 1891, and was from 1900 to 1901 home to the Dixie Coca-Cola Bottling Company, established by Benjamin Franklin Thomas and Joseph Brown Whitehead in 1899 as the exclusive bottler of Coca-Cola for a large part of the United States. Of ten sites definitively established with the early history of Coca-Cola (which was first distributed as a fountain drink from facilities in the city in 1887), it is the only one still standing. Since 1966, it has served as Georgia State University's Baptist Student Center. It had deteriorated in condition by the 1970s, including some loss of its historic integrity, but has since undergone at least an exterior restoration.In 2024, the property was vacated by the Baptist Collegiate Ministry due to conditions deteriorating and was later put up for sale.

== Gallery ==
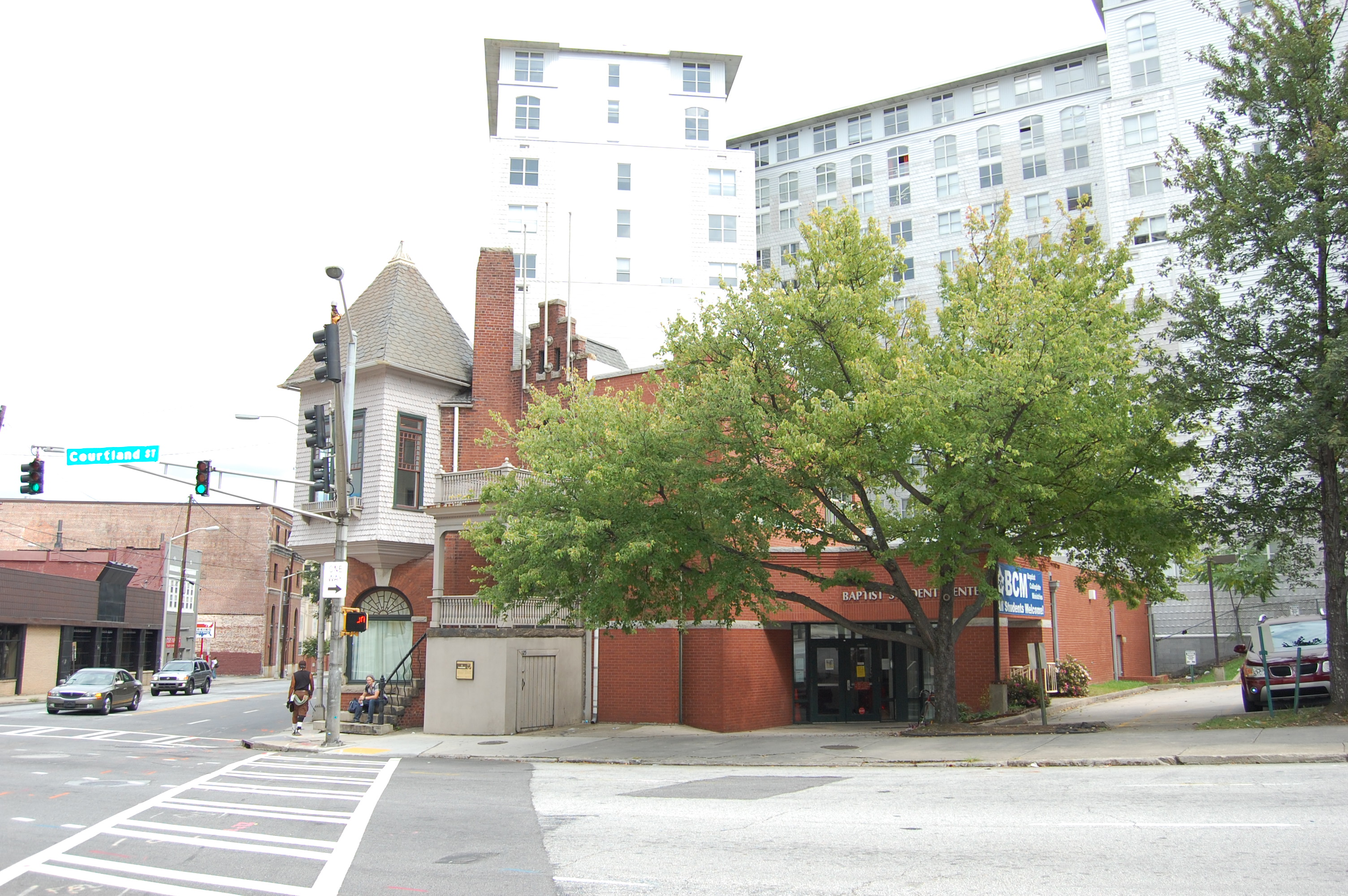

== See also ==
- List of Coca-Cola buildings and structures
- List of National Historic Landmarks in Georgia (U.S. state)
- National Register of Historic Places listings in Fulton County, Georgia
