= Joseph Whitehead (Coca-Cola bottler) =

American lawyer

- Born: Joseph Brown Whitehead; February 29, 1864; Oxford, Mississippi, US
- Died: August 27, 1906 (aged 42); Thaxton, Virginia, US
- Education: University of Mississippi
- Occupations: Lawyer, philanthropist
- Spouse: Letitia Pate (m. 1895)
- Children: 2

Joseph Brown Whitehead (1864–1906) was a lawyer, who, along with Benjamin Thomas and John Thomas Lupton, obtained exclusive rights from Asa Candler to bottle and sell Coca-Cola.

== Early life ==
Whitehead was born in Oxford, Mississippi in 1864. He was the son of Richard H. Whitehead (1836–1912), a Baptist minister in Mississippi, and Mary Amanda Conkey Whitehead (d. 1869). His younger brother was Henry Parsons Whitehead.

He attended the University of Mississippi and graduated with a degree in law.

== Career ==
In 1899, Whitehead and Thomas met with Candler. Candler gave the two exclusive rights to bottle the soft drink. After this meeting, Lupton partnered with them and he became the president of the Coca-Cola Bottling Company.

== Personal life ==
In 1895, he married Lettie Pate and then the couple moved to Chattanooga, Tennessee.

Whitehead died unexpectedly in 1906 from pneumonia. After his death, his widow took over "her husband's share of the bottling business, as well as his real estate interests," and "established the Whitehead Holding Company and the Whitehead Realty Company to manage her assets and those of her two sons."

=== Legacy ===
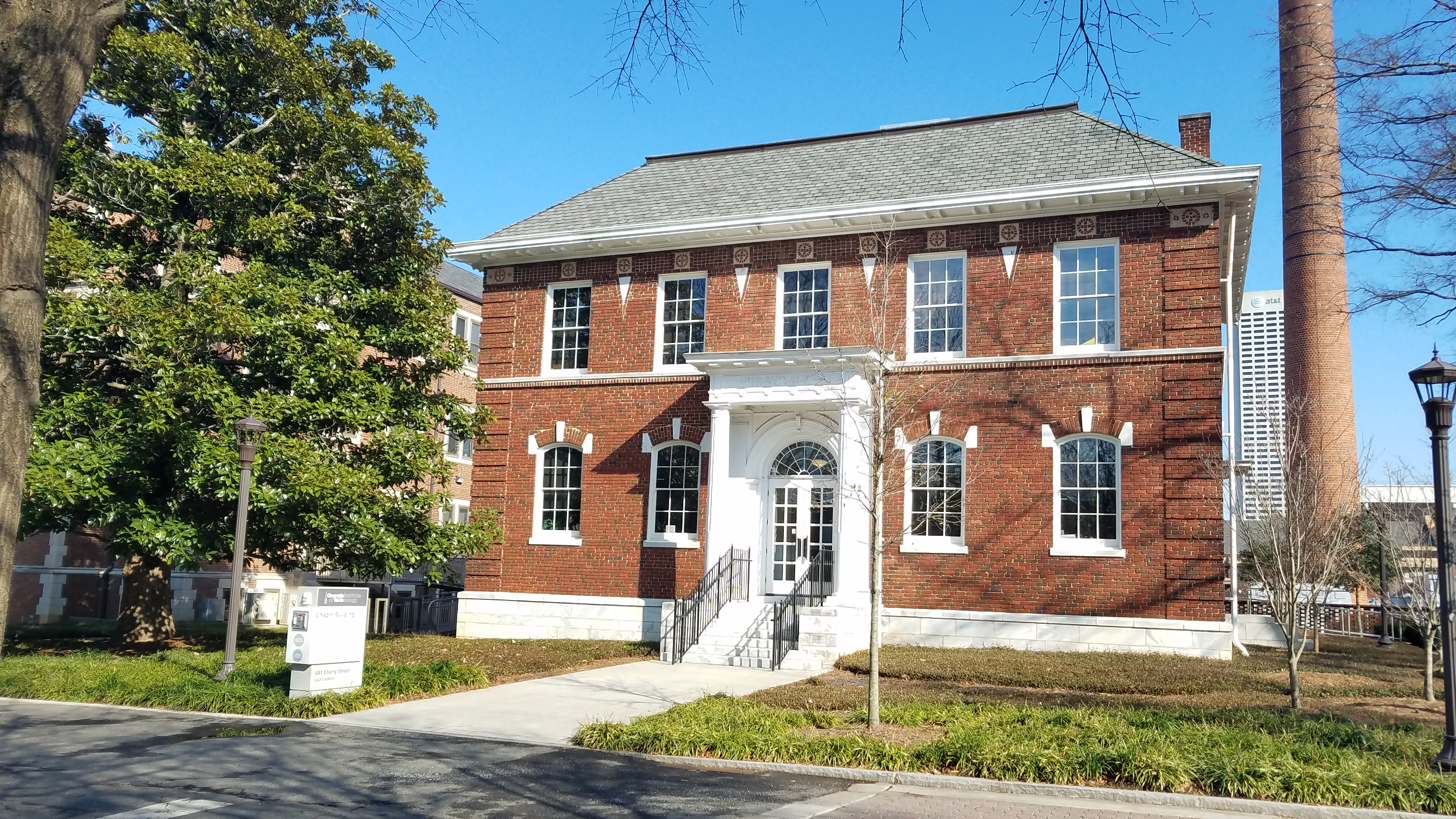
Chapin Building, originally named the Joseph Brown Whitehead Memorial Hospital

Because of the philanthropy of his widow, Joseph Brown Whitehead has been the namesake for three health buildings on the main campus of the Georgia Institute of Technology. The original building, built in 1911, has since been renamed the Chapin Building, while the Joseph Brown Whitehead Building currently serves as the home for the campus health services.
