= Creative Discovery Museum =

Children's museum in Chattanooga, Tennessee, United States

Coordinates: 35.05269°N 85.31228°W

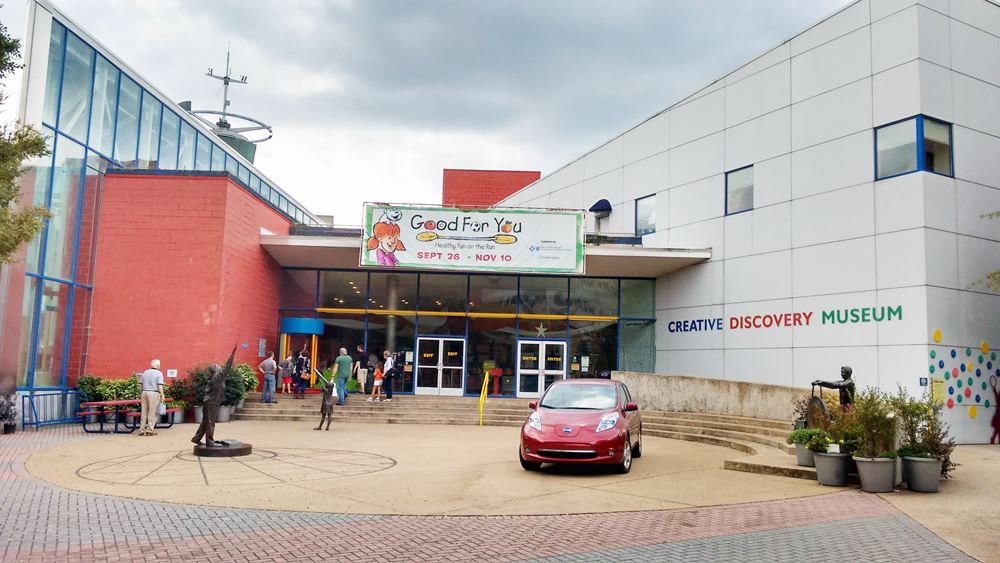
- Front entrance
- Established: May 26, 1995; 31 years ago
- Location: 321 Chestnut St, Chattanooga, TN, U.S.
- Type: Children's museum
- Chairpersons: Christie Burbank; Patrick Stowe
- Website: www.cdmfun.org

The Creative Discovery Museum is a children's museum located in downtown Chattanooga, Tennessee. It was opened on May 26, 1995. The museum contains art, music, and field science areas, along with a water-themed zone called RiverPlay, a rooftop exhibit, an inventor's workshop, and a temporary exhibit space. Exhibits are mostly designed for children aged 18 months to 12 years.

== Activities ==
The Creative Discovery Museum offers multiple programs including school tours, birthday parties, lock-ins, and outreach programs to Chattanooga-area schools and education centers. Guided lessons are sometimes available in the art, kitchen, and science areas as well as story time; the lesson topics change almost monthly. Tours are available for larger parties including school groups and visiting day camps. Birthday parties can be scheduled and are a hit among younger children. Lock-ins provide free time for play in the museum, scheduled time in the gift shop, dinner (usually pizza), snacks, and a lesson.

== Areas ==
The museum has several areas in which children can learn and play. RiverPlay is a two-story tall exhibit with a riverboat area for toddlers and larger area for older children. Kids and parents can climb to the top of the exhibit, over a swinging bridge out to a lookout station, and then slide through a twisting tunnel back down. There is a water table where children can learn how lock and dam systems work. Toddlers have their own section of the museum called The Little Yellow House. The art area is popular and teaches children about art from all across the world. The music area is newly renovated and contains exhibits which demonstrate different instruments and music from different cultures. The field science area contains a section where children can dig fossils out of the sand and investigate various dinosaurs.
