= Baylor School =

Prep school in Chattanooga, Tennessee, US

Coordinates: 35.087°N 85.338°W

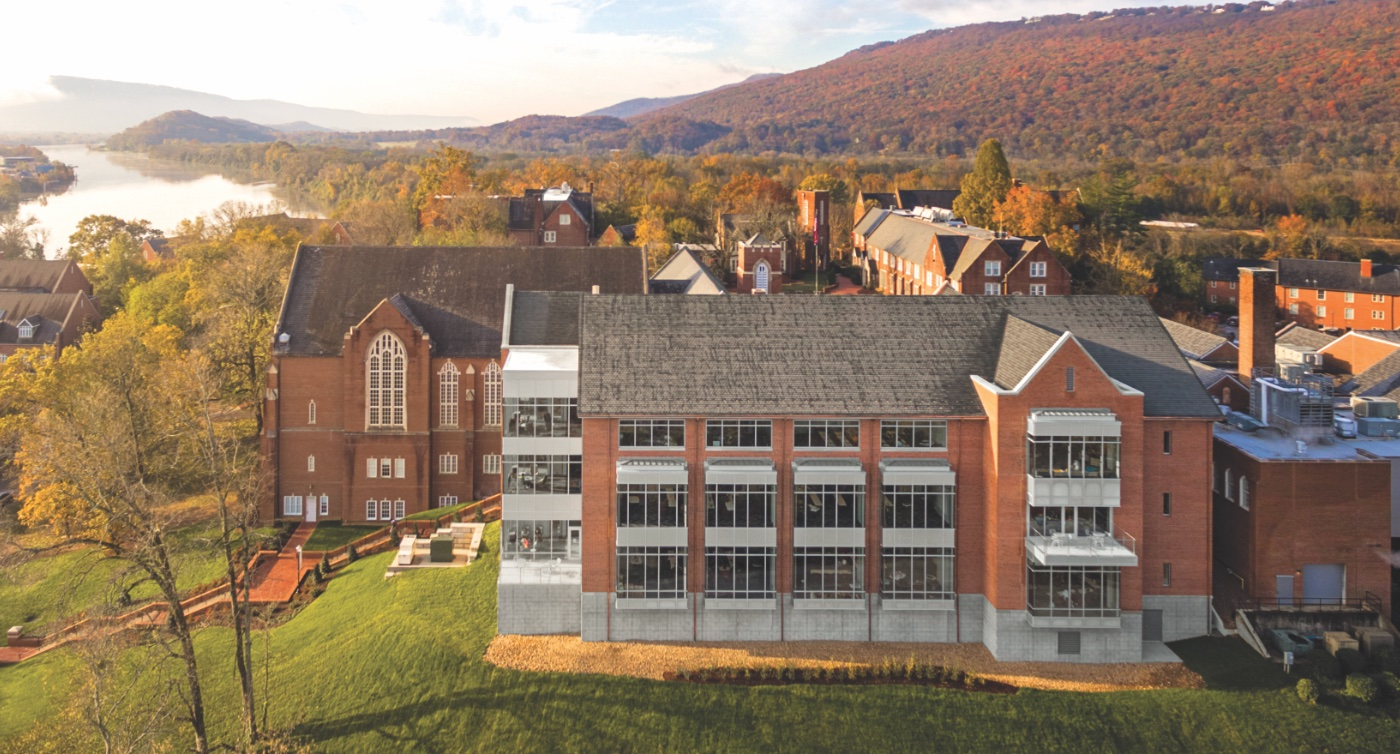

Location
- 171 Baylor School Road; Chattanooga, Tennessee 37405; United States

Information
- School type: Private, boarding, day
- Motto: Amat Victoria Curam (Victory Loves Care)
- Established: 1893
- CEEB code: 430275
- Headmaster: Chris Angel
- Faculty: 140 teaching faculty
- Grades: 6 to 12
- Gender: Coeducational
- Enrollment: 240 boarding (9-12); 525 day (9-12); 355 day (6-8); 1120 total
- Average class size: 15 students
- Student to teacher ratio: 8:1
- Classes offered: 28 AP Courses Advanced Research Tract
- Campus size: 690 acres (2.8 km^{2})
- Campus type: Suburban
- Colors: Red , Gray , and White
- Athletics: 27 varsity sports
- Athletics conference: TSSAA
- Mascot: Red Raider
- Rivals: McCallie (Boys) & GPS (Girls)
- Newspaper: Headlines from the Hill
- Yearbook: The Tower
- Endowment: $165 million as of 2025
- Website: baylorschool.org

Baylor School is a private, coeducational college-preparatory school in Chattanooga, Tennessee, United States. Founded in 1893, the school's current campus comprises 690 acres and enrolls students in grades 6 to 12, including boarding students in grades 9 through 12. These students are served by Baylor's 140-member faculty, over two-thirds of whom hold advanced degrees, including nearly 40 adults who live on campus and serve as dorm parents. Baylor has had a student win the Siemens Award for Advanced Placement in math and science and a teacher received the National Siemens Award for Exemplary Teaching.

For the 2025–26 school year, Baylor enrolled 1120 students in grades 6–12. Boarders comprise 31% of Baylor's upper school student body and originate from 19 states and 18 different countries. 88% of Baylor's coed boarding population hails from North America. Baylor maintains a 1:1 male-to-female ratio across day and boarding enrollment.

Baylor consistently wins the Max Preps Cup for the top overall high school athletics program in Tennessee, including for the 2024-25 year. Baylor has won 286 TSSAA state championships, the most of any school in Tennessee. The school has also repeatedly been named national champion in both men's and women's swimming, by Swimming World magazine.

== History ==
=== Origins ===
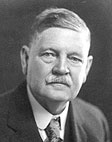
John Roy Baylor

Baylor School was founded in 1893 by John Roy Baylor, a graduate of the University of Virginia. He had been hired by leading men of Chattanooga to establish a college-preparatory school for the "young men of the city", and on September 12, Baylor's University School of Chattanooga opened its doors for its first class, a group of 31 boys between ages of 10 and 17, each charged a tuition of $100. These classes were originally held in an old house in downtown Chattanooga, located at 101 McCallie Avenue; the school later moved to a location on Palmetto Street, also in the city. The first classes of the school were all-male; in 1900, the school began enrolling young women, but by 1912 had reverted to having an all-male class. The school did not again admit women until 1985, over 70 years later. In 1915, with the help of philanthropist John Thomas Lupton, Baylor moved to its current location overlooking the Tennessee River. That 30-acre (120,000 m^{2}) campus has since expanded to 670 acres (2.7 km^{2}), but the quadrangle in the center of campus has never moved, marking the location of the heart of Baylor School.

=== Military school ===
In 1914, World War I broke out in Europe; by the fall of 1917, hundreds of thousands of American soldiers were fighting in the war. In response to the growing need of the United States for honorable, well-educated soldiers, Baylor became a military school, fully accredited by the U.S. War Department. Baylor remained a military school until 1971—the midst of the Vietnam War, when public support for the war was at an all-time low.

=== New headmasters ===
In 1925, the school began calling itself "Baylor School" in honor of its founder, who died in the following year. The school then named Dr. Alexander Guerry as its second headmaster. He remained in that position from 1926 to 1929, before leaving the school to become chancellor of the University of Chattanooga and then chancellor of The University of the South. His successor was Herbert B. Barks Sr., who remained as headmaster for the next 35 years. His successor was headmaster Scott Wilson, a graduate of the class of 1975. In 2021 Wilson retired. He is succeeded by Chris Angel, Baylor class of 1989.

=== Rivalries ===
The school has maintained a strong rivalry with the crosstown boys-only McCallie School ever since McCallie's founding in 1905. Baylor historically had close ties with Chattanooga's Girls Preparatory School, until Baylor began admitting girls in 1985. The two schools are now rivals in girls' athletics.

== Finances ==
=== Endowment ===
Baylor's endowment (or net fund balance) is currently $165 million, which includes the standalone $15 million Weeks endowment dedicated to supporting STEM programming and the Baylor Research Scholars program. This endowment is maintained by about 20 trustees and is one of the 30 highest endowments among boarding schools in the United States. On a per-student basis, $165 million divided by 1120 students yields an average value of over $145,000 per student, higher even than several universities such as Babson College, The College of William & Mary, and Rochester Institute of Technology.

=== Tuition ===
Baylor's tuition for 2025-2026 is $32,650 for day students, $66,000 for domestic boarding students and $71,250 for international boarding students. For day and boarding applicants, Baylor offers need-based financial aid in addition to merit scholarships via the Baylor Scholarship Program. For day students, Baylor also offers need-based financial aid, and awards the Jo Conn Guild Scholarship for students of exceptional merit. For Baylor's 2015–16 school year, the average boarding student received an aid package worth $27,118; the average day student received an aid package worth $11,096.

== Admissions ==
- Baylor's admissions process is highly selective with both day and boarding admissions operating from a waitlist each spring.
- Baylor receives approximately 4.5 boarding applications for each boarding enrollment spot and 2.5 day applications for each day enrollment spot.
- Baylor maintains an early decision admissions process with a December 15 deadline for day and boarding applicants, as well as regular decision admissions process with a January 15 deadline. Day and boarding applications are received as part of a rolling decisions process after the January 15 deadline; however, admissible students who apply after the regular decision deadline may be waitlisted due to enrollment capacity constraints.

== Academics ==
- Baylor offers 28 advanced placement courses. In 1954, it was one of only 38 secondary schools, and the only one in the South, invited to participate in the then-new AP program.
- Baylor's core curriculum consists of mathematics, English, science, history, and language classes. Baylor offers language classes in: Spanish, French, Latin, German, and Chinese.
- Baylor offers a two or three-year Research Scholars program with tracts in engineering, biochemistry, environmental, and sustainability in which students are guided by a Ph.D. teaching faculty as they pursue thesis-level research.

== Boarding ==
- Baylor's boarding community consists of 240 male and female boarders from 17 states and 18 countries. 88% of Baylor's boarding population hails from North America.
- In 2025, Baylor announced plans for the addition of a new dorm complex to house 96 beds, a student wellness center, event space, and new admissions center. The dorm is expected to come online Fall 2027, though increases in enrollment will be staged as older dorms on campus are renovated over the ensuing two-to-three year period.
- Baylor's boarding capacity has grown by 20% since the 2022–23 school year, driven by the completion of a new dorm, Howalt Hall.

== Athletics ==
Baylor consistently wins the Max Preps Cup for the top overall high school athletics program in Tennessee, including for the 2024-25 year. Baylor has won 286 TSSAA state championships, the most of any school in Tennessee. Baylor's 1973 football team was named national champions by the National Sports News Service, and both men's and women's swim teams have been named national champions by Swimming World magazine. Brian Gottfried, who played tennis for Baylor and was later inducted into its Hall of Fame, rose after graduating to become the number-three ranked singles player in the world. Baylor's teams are nicknamed the Red Raiders and Lady Raiders. Baylor competes in the Tennessee Secondary School Athletic Association and its current varsity sports (as of 2026) are:

- Baseball
- Basketball
- Cheerleading
- Crew
- Cross country running
- Diving
- Football
- Golf

- Lacrosse
- Softball
- Soccer
- Swimming
- Tennis
- Track and field
- Volleyball
- Wrestling

=== State championships ===
As of December 2024

State championships
| Season | Sport | Number of championships | Year |
|---|---|---|---|
| Fall | Football | 3 | 1973, 2022, 2025 |
| Fall | Cross country, boys | 8 | 1986, 1988, 1993, 1994, 1999, 2000, 2007, 2008 |
| Fall | Cross country, girls | 7 | 1991, 1995, 1997, 2008, 2009, 2010, 2012 |
| Fall | Crew | 3 | 2007, 2008, 2021 |
| Fall | Golf, girls | 20 | 1995, 1996, 1997, 1998, 1999, 2000, 2001, 2002, 2003, 2004, 2005, 2006, 2007, 2008, 2009, 2010, 2012, 2013, 2020, 2021 |
| Fall | Soccer, boys | 9 | 1976, 1979, 1980, 1997, 2000, 2007, 2012, 2018, 2022 |
| Fall | Soccer, girls | 11 | 1997, 1999, 2001, 2002, 2003, 2004, 2010, 2011, 2017, 2023, 2024 |
| Fall | Volleyball | 4 | 1997, 1998, 2014, 2017 |
| Winter | Wrestling, girls | 1 | 2022 |
| Winter | Bowling, boys | 1 | 2002 |
| Winter | Fencing | 17 | 2000, 2001, 2002, 2003, 2004, 2005, 2006, 2007, 2008, 2009, 2011, 2012, 2013, 2014, 2015, 2016, 2017 |
| Winter | Swimming, boys | 30 | 1968, 1972, 1974, 1982, 1983, 1984, 1985, 1986, 1987, 1988, 1989, 1990, 1992, 1993, 1994, 1995, 1996, 1997, 2007, 2008, 2009, 2011, 2013, 2014, 2015, 2017, 2018, 2020 (tie), 2021, 2022, 2026 |
| Winter | Swimming, girls | 18 | 1990, 1992, 1993, 1994, 1995, 1996, 1997, 1998, 2008, 2009, 2010, 2011, 2012, 2013, 2019, 2020, 2021, 2022, 2026 |
| Winter | Swimming, combined | 31 | 1987, 1988, 1989, 1990, 1992, 1993, 1994, 1995, 1996, 1998, 1999, 2000, 2001, 2004, 2006, 2007, 2008, 2009, 2010, 2011, 2012, 2013, 2014, 2015, 2016, 2017, 2018, 2019, 2020, 2021, 2022 |
| Winter | Wrestling, boys | 19 | 1962 (Pre-TSSAA), 1978, 1979, 1981, 1999, 2001, 2002, 2004, 2005, 2006, 2007, 2008, 2010, 2011, 2019, 2020, 2021, 2022, 2025 |
| Winter | Wrestling, duals | 14 | 2001, 2002, 2005, 2007, 2008, 2009, 2011, 2014, 2015, 2019, 2020, 2021, 2022, 2025 |
| Spring | Baseball | 5 | 2003, 2006, 2018, 2019, 2021 |
| Spring | Golf, boys | 19 | 1988, 1989, 1993, 1994, 1995, 1996, 1999, 2000, 2001, 2003, 2004, 2005, 2006, 2007, 2008, 2012, 2015, 2018, 2020, 2021 |
| Spring | Lacrosse, boys | 1 | 2010 |
| Spring | Softball | 14 | 1993, 1994, 2003, 2004, 2005, 2011, 2012, 2013, 2015, 2016, 2017, 2018, 2019, 2021 |
| Spring | Tennis, boys | 16 | 1971, 1973, 1974, 1975, 1979, 1982, 1983, 1985, 1986, 1988, 1989, 1990, 1993, 1996, 1997, 2016 |
| Spring | Tennis, girls | 13 | 1993, 1996, 1999, 2000, 2011, 2012, 2013, 2014, 2015, 2016, 2017, 2018, 2019 |
| Spring | Track & Field, boys | 2 | 2000, 2002 |
| Spring | Track & Field, girls | 7 | 1997 (Relays), 1998, 1999, 2008, 2009, 2010, 2011 |
| Total | | 270 | |

== Programs ==
- Walkabout is an outdoors program that takes students kayaking, rock climbing, bouldering, trekking, hiking, and caving. Walkabout also goes on an annual trip to Costa Rica for advanced kayakers and a biennial trip to India to trek.
- Baylor's community service program, "R.E.S.P.E.C.T." (Regard Every Soul Purely Embracing Compassionate Thoughts), takes 10 students (juniors and seniors) to Kingston, Jamaica, every spring break after they have spent the school year raising money to send Jamaican children to school. On this trip, they visit a state-run home for the aged, a state-run orphanage, and the community whose children are sent to school with the money these high school students have raised. Students from the community service program also take trips to Asheville, North Carolina, twice a year to volunteer in a local homeless shelter. Baylor also does community service within the community of Chattanooga; there is an after school program in which students go to schools or centers within Chattanooga to help tutor children from surrounding schools and help them in their school work. This program is offered throughout the entire school year.
- Baylor has more than 60 other extracurricular organizations, including the Round Table Literary Discussion Society, which began in 1942, the Peer Tutor Program, the Student Congress and Model United Nations Team, and the annual Periaktoi art magazine.
- Tenth- and eleventh-grade students can participate in a student exchange program with schools around the world, such as the Southport School and St Hilda's School in Southport, Queensland, Australia, along with Bishops College in Cape Town, South Africa.
- Seniors end their year with a senior camping trip, a tradition begun in 1975.

== Campus ==
Baylor's 670-acre (2.7 km^{2}) campus is located on the banks of the Tennessee River with red-brick buildings scattered around the campus, some almost 100 years old. Some of the buildings and facilities include:

=== Academic facilities ===
- Katherine and Harrison Weeks Science Building, Baylor's science building, houses biology, chemistry, physics, astronomy, forensic science, human physiology, environmental science, genetics, and Lower School science classes. Baylor's main computer lab, "the Bullpen," is located on the bottom floor of Weeks. This computer lab is open to the public and also hosts Baylor's computer science and computer applications classes in private computer classrooms. The building opened in 1999, named for benefactor Katherine Weeks and her husband, Harrison, a student from 1925 to 1928.
- Barks Hall is home to Baylor's Lower School. The top two floors of Barks belong to Hedges Library, Baylor's school library. The 1961 building is named for former headmaster Herbert B. Barks.
- Academic Hall, formerly known as the Lower School Building, is the home of Baylor's foreign language classes, as well as an English classroom. Languages offered are Spanish, French, German, Chinese, and Latin.
- Probasco Academic Center serves as the hub for English and history classes. The $14 million building with newly updated classrooms opened in September 2018. It was built on the site of a former dorm and academic building, Trustee Hall.
- An addition to Baylor's Alumni Chapel was dedicated in 1991 by Rev. Billy Graham. The main chapel is where weekly assemblies and chapel services are held. (The school began as a non-sectarian school; now not a religious school, it retains a chaplain and required "chapel" meetings that feature guest speakers. Electives are taught in ethics and religion.) The original 1927 chapel, now called Old Chapel, is now used for upper-school study hall. Beneath the main chapel is a majority of the mathematics department. The chapel also houses the Board of Trustees' board room.

=== Art facilities ===
- Ireland Fine Arts Center is Baylor's fine arts building. Ireland houses Baylor's pottery, drawing, painting, print making, and lower-school art classes. Ireland provides inspirational views for artists as it overlooks the Tennessee River. Named for the family of benefactor Bill Ireland, class of 1941.
- The Roddy Performing Arts Center is home to Baylor's performing arts. Dance, drama, photography, and film classes are located in Roddy. Roddy has a 148-seat black box theater, equipped with a state of the art Strand Lighting system. The building also houses a large scene shop, dance studio, photo studio, screening rooms, and a darkroom. Roddy is also used by outside production companies throughout the year to bring special productions to the Baylor community. Named for the benefactors, the Roddy family of Knoxville, Tenn.
- Baylor's Music Building is the building on Baylor's campus that houses all music related items. This includes rooms for both middle and upper school choir, orchestra, and band, along with many practice rooms and smaller rehearsal rooms. The Music Building houses Baylor's choir, band, orchestra, and various other music classes.

=== Residential facilities ===
- Lowrance Dorm is one of Baylor's four girls' dorms. Lowrance overlooks the Tennessee River, and is home to students of all grades. Lowrance, built in 1989, also houses the infirmary. It is named in honor of Ruth Lowrance Street, the wife of trustee Gordon P. Street and mother of trustee Gordon P. Street Jr.
- Hunter Hall is home to Baylor's admission and administrative staff. Hunter is located at the center of campus and houses a girls' dormitory as well as two classrooms in Hunter. Built in 1917 as Academic Building, it is named for 1907 alumnus and trustee George T. Hunter.
- Probasco Hall is one of four boys' dorms. The 1966 building is named for benefactor Scott L. Probasco.
- Riverfront Dorm is Baylor's newest girls' dorm. It overlooks the Tennessee River. Riverfront, along with Harrison Hall, are Baylor's only dorms that are fully residential (i.e. no classrooms or offices).
- Lupton II, III, and Lupton Annex are the home to Baylor boys from all grades. Lupton III is known for having the largest dorm rooms on campus. Lupton also overlooks the Tennessee River. Latin, French, English, mathematics, and history classes are also held in the bottom two floors of Lupton. Lupton Annex and Lupton are connected at the third and fourth floors. The first Lupton Hall was built in 1915. The buildings are named for Coca-Cola bottler John Thomas Lupton, the largest benefactor of the school.
- Harrison Hall houses 24 male students and two dorm parents, was dedicated on May 8, 2009. It honors the family of trustee J. Frank Harrison.
- Howalt Hall is the newest of Baylor's residential life facilities. Opening in September 2023, Howalt Hall houses 24 students and two residential life faculty families.

=== Dining facilities ===
- Guerry Hall is the dining hall. The 1931 building was recently expanded and modernized. It honors the school's second headmaster, Alexander Guerry. Also, Guerry Hall is being renovated the summer of 2015.

=== Athletic facilities ===
- The Field House is Baylor's main home for athletics. It has three basketball courts made of a multi-versatile surface, a cardio-weight room, several men's and women's locker rooms, several coaches' offices, the training room, James C. Duke Arena (Baylor's main basketball court), and the meeting room for Baylor's Honor Council. The newest addition to the Field House is Baylor's Aquatic Center, the school's multimillion-dollar, Olympic-sized swimming pool, which opened in 2006.
- Baylor's Alexander Guerry Tennis Center, completed in 1987, includes 12 outdoor courts and 7 indoor courts. Named for the benefactor.
- The Luke Worsham Memorial Wrestling Arena is Baylor's new wrestling facility. It was built in the structure of Baylor's former swimming pool, but is now a state-of-the-art wrestling arena. Named for the former teacher and wrestling coach.
- Heywood Stadium is home to Baylor's football team in the fall, track and field and lacrosse teams in the spring. Built in 1971, it was named for former coach Humpy Heywood. The field is named for former football coach E.B. "Red" Etter.
- Baylor also has its own Short Game Center where Baylor's boys' and sixteen-time state champion girls' golf team practice.
- The Lower Fields are home to Baylor's varsity and junior varsity baseball, softball, lacrosse, and soccer teams. Baylor's cross country loop and crew boathouse are also located at the Lower Fields.
- The Parry Center, located near the Tennis Center, is home to Baylor's Walkabout program. There is also an indoor climbing gym located directly behind the Parry Center.

=== Other campus features ===
- Perched in the quadrangle in the heart of the campus is a statue of the mythological character Icarus, placed in memory of a student, Johnson Bryant, who died in a 2003 car wreck while a student at Baylor. The statue stands as a reminder to students to always find balance to avoid a similar fate.

== Traditions ==
As an outgrowth of the well-known Baylor/McCallie rivalry, the oldest rivalry in Tennessee, the school week of the football game is referred to as "Spirit Week". During this time, students may forgo wearing the required uniform to wear themed costumes. The most commonly recurring of these themes is "Red Day," typically the Friday of the Baylor/McCallie football game, in celebration of the school's color; students dress in as much red as possible. Prizes are awarded to whichever student is deemed by the school to be wearing the most red.

In 2009 Baylor won the well-known rivalry football game against McCallie for the first time in eleven years, and subsequently won the game against McCallie five more times, from 2009 to 2013. Their most recent win against McCallie was in 2015. (The wins occurred in four regularly scheduled Baylor-McCallie games as well as a TSSAA playoff game.) In 2014, Baylor's streak was cut short when McCallie decided to play at their home field, Spears Stadium. After that, the winning team was usually determined by home field advantage. This was the case until 2017, when McCallie won big against Baylor at Heywood Stadium. Baylor then suffered six straight losses against McCallie on both fields, as well as Finley Stadium in 2020 (they could not play at Spears Stadium due to the COVID pandemic). In 2022, the Red Raiders finally snapped the Blue Tornados' six-game winning streak, winning 31–27. The Red Raiders replicated Spirit Week game victories in 2024 and 2025 as well.

== Honor code and Honor Council ==
Baylor students must abide by the rules of Baylor's honor code, established in 1916. Baylor School's honor code is based on the honor code at the University of Virginia. When students enter the school, they sign a pledge: "the Honor System is an understanding among Baylor student that they do not want among them one who will lie, cheat, or falsify information. I understand this principle, and I recognize that I shall be expected to live in accordance with it." After entry to Baylor, before every test, Baylor students sign their name, pledging "I pledge that I have upheld both the letter and the spirit of the Baylor Honor Code, neither giving nor receiving unauthorized assistance on this assessment." Students who are charged with violating the honor code must stand trial with the Honor Council, consisting of two freshmen, three sophomores, four juniors, and five seniors. Punishments for violation of the honor code range from a warning to expulsion.

== Notable alumni and faculty ==
=== Alumni ===
Baylor alumni are noted in a wide variety of fields. Perhaps the Baylor alum with the most historical significance is businessman Jo Conn Guild, who together with Wendell Willkie sued to oppose the Tennessee Valley Authority nearly one hundred years ago. In the current era, many alumni are noted for their work in politics, including U.S. Ambassador to NATO David M. Abshire, U.S. presidential candidate Thomas J. Anderson, Tennessee State Senator Bo Watson, Tennessee Attorney General Robert E. Cooper Jr., current Chattanooga mayor Tim Kelly, former Chattanooga mayor Andy Berke, Georgia Congressman Charlie Norwood, and the 48th governor of Alabama, Fob James. Several Baylor graduates have excelled in medicine, including emergency medicine physician Francis M. Fesmire, and psychiatrist Robert Taylor Segraves. A number of Baylor graduates, such as Hugh Beaumont (famous for being the father on the classic 1950s and early 1960s TV show Leave it to Beaver), have gone on to have notable careers in entertainment. Many Baylor students go on to play sports collegiately and professionally, including Brian Gottfried who reached No. 3 in the world in tennis, World No. 4-ranked tennis player Roscoe Tanner, collegiate and pro golfers Keith Mitchell and Harris English, Olympic gold medal-winning swimmer Geoff Gaberino, swimmer Brad Hamilton, Pro Football Hall of Famer John Hannah, College Football Hall of Famer Herman Hickman, and pro football player Jacques McClendon and pro football player David Thomas, and Major League Baseball Rookie of the Year (2025) Nick Kurtz. Notable alumni involved in journalism and literature include Pulitzer Prize–winning journalists and authors Bill Dedman and Wendell Rawls Jr.; newspaper editors Shelby Coffey III, and Albert Hodges Morehead; and authors Coleman Barks, William E. Duff, and Arthur Golden.

=== Headmasters ===
Headmasters through the years include:

- 1893–1926: John Roy Baylor was the founder and led the school in its 25th anniversary in 1918; the school was named after him one year prior to his death in 1926.
- 1926–1929: Alexander Guerry became the headmaster upon the death of the founder. He went on to lead the University of Tennessee at Chattanooga and Sewanee: University of the South.
- 1929–1964: Herbert B. Barks Sr. led the school through the Depression, World War II, and a 1940 polio epidemic that killed one student. He also led the school in its 50th anniversary celebrations in 1943.
- 1964–1970: Charles E. Hawkins, III led the school through the turbulent sixties, headed the celebrations of the school's 75th anniversary in 1968, and resigned as the school was debating dropping the military program. He was succeeded by an acting headmaster, teacher Bryce Harris.
- 1971–1988: Herbert B. Barks Jr. was the son of the former headmaster and a 1951 alumnus. He was headmaster when 40 girls (the Fab 40) were admitted in 1985.
- 1988–1998: L. Laird Davis Jr. saw the school celebrate its centennial celebrations in 1993, the completion of the fine arts complex, and the groundbreaking for the Weeks Science Building.
- 1998–2004: James E. Buckheit added the sixth grade and saw the school through the beginning of the 21st century. He was then followed by an interim headmaster, former Baylor teacher Jack Stanford.
- 2004–2009: Bill Stacy was a former chancellor of the University of Tennessee at Chattanooga.
- 2009–2021: Scott Wilson is a 1975 alumnus and former teacher, coach, and admissions director. The school added a new academic center, a sports performance center, renovations of several buildings, and new academic programs.
- 2021–: Chris Angel, a 1989 alumnus, was named in April 2020 to begin at the end of the 2020–2021 school year.
