= List of bottling companies =

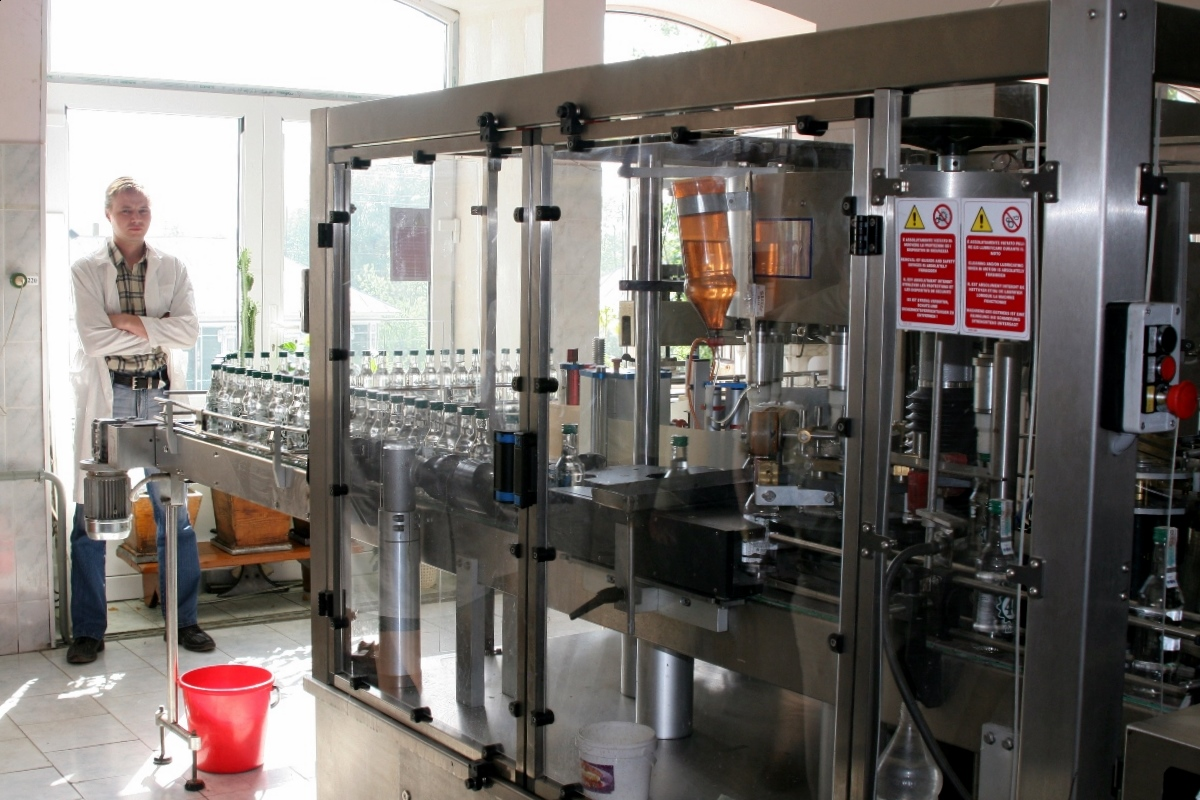
A vodka bottling machine for Shatskaya Vodka, in Shatsk, Russia

A bottling company is a commercial enterprise whose output is the bottling of beverages for distribution. A bottler is a company which mixes drink ingredients and fills up cans and bottles with the drink. The bottler then distributes the final product to wholesale sellers in a geographic area. Large companies like The Coca-Cola Company sell their product to bottlers such as the Coca-Cola Bottling Co., who then bottle and distribute it.

== A ==
- A.J. Canfield Company
- The American Bottling Company
- Arizona Beverage Company
- A-Treat Bottling Company

== B ==
- Boylan Bottling Company
- Brænne Mineralvatn
- Britvic
- Brooklyn Bottling Group

== C ==
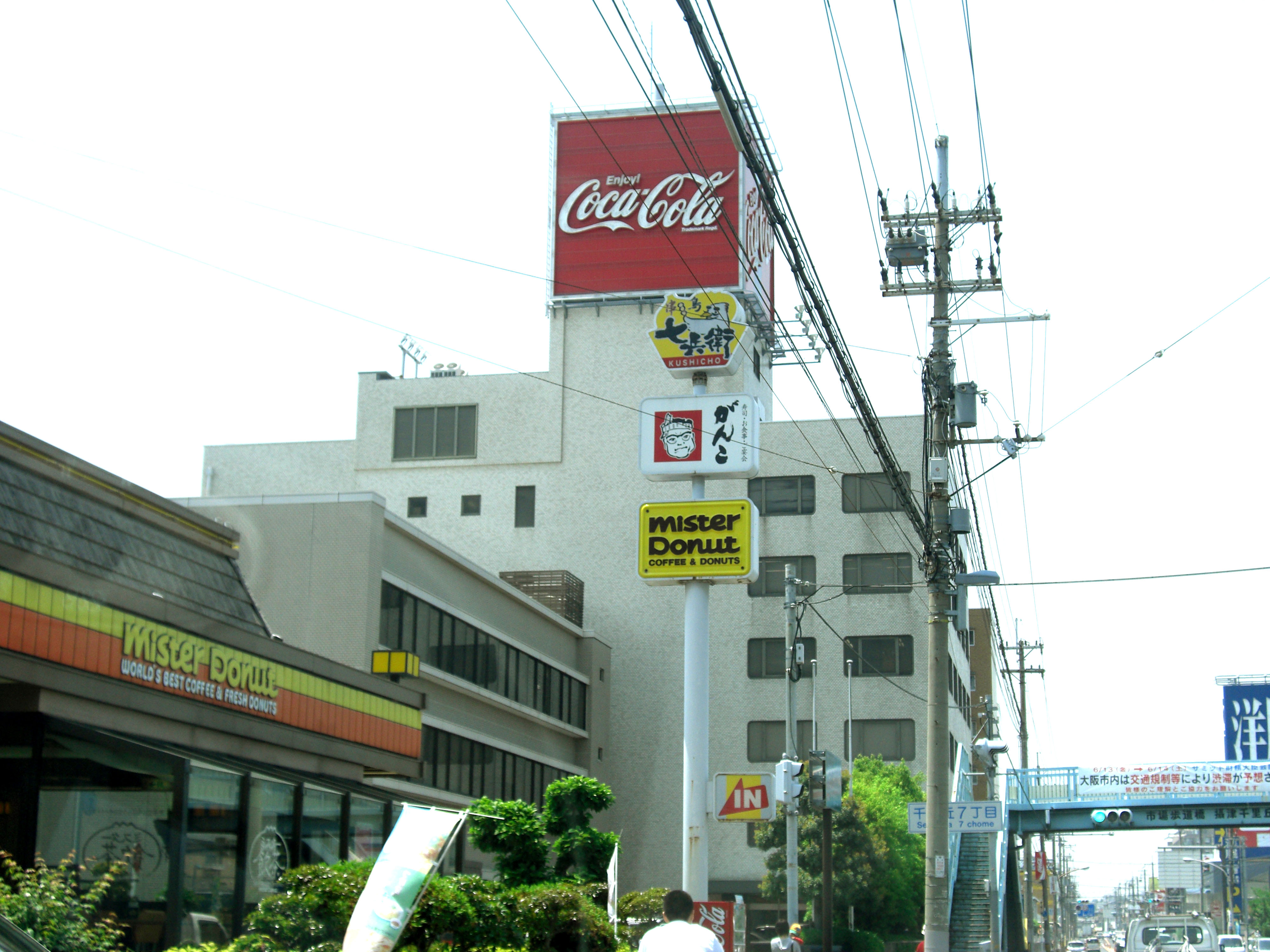
Kinki Coca-Cola Bottling, Senrioka Settsu-City, Osaka, Japan

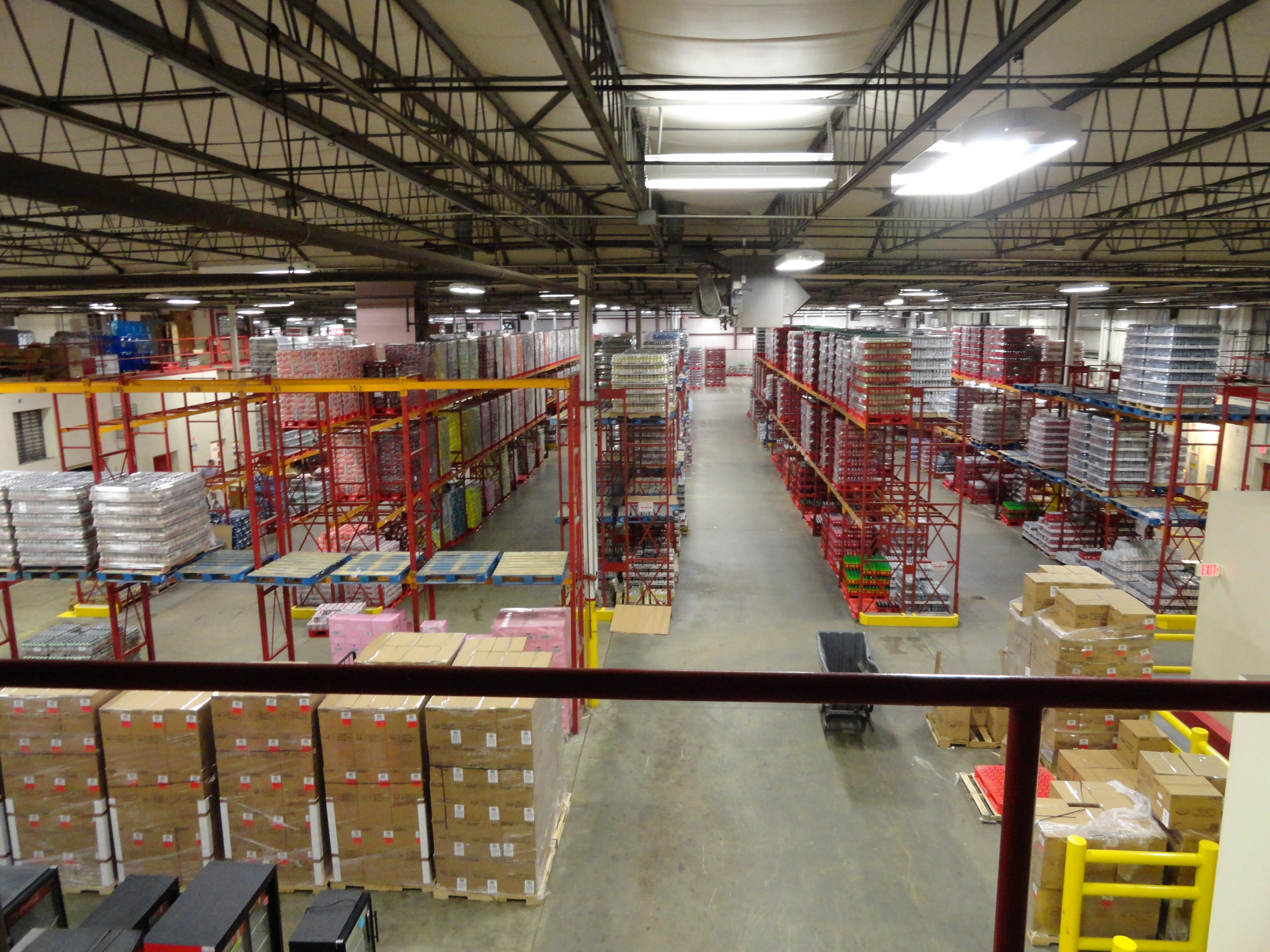
Coca-Cola Bottling Company of Cape Cod warehouse

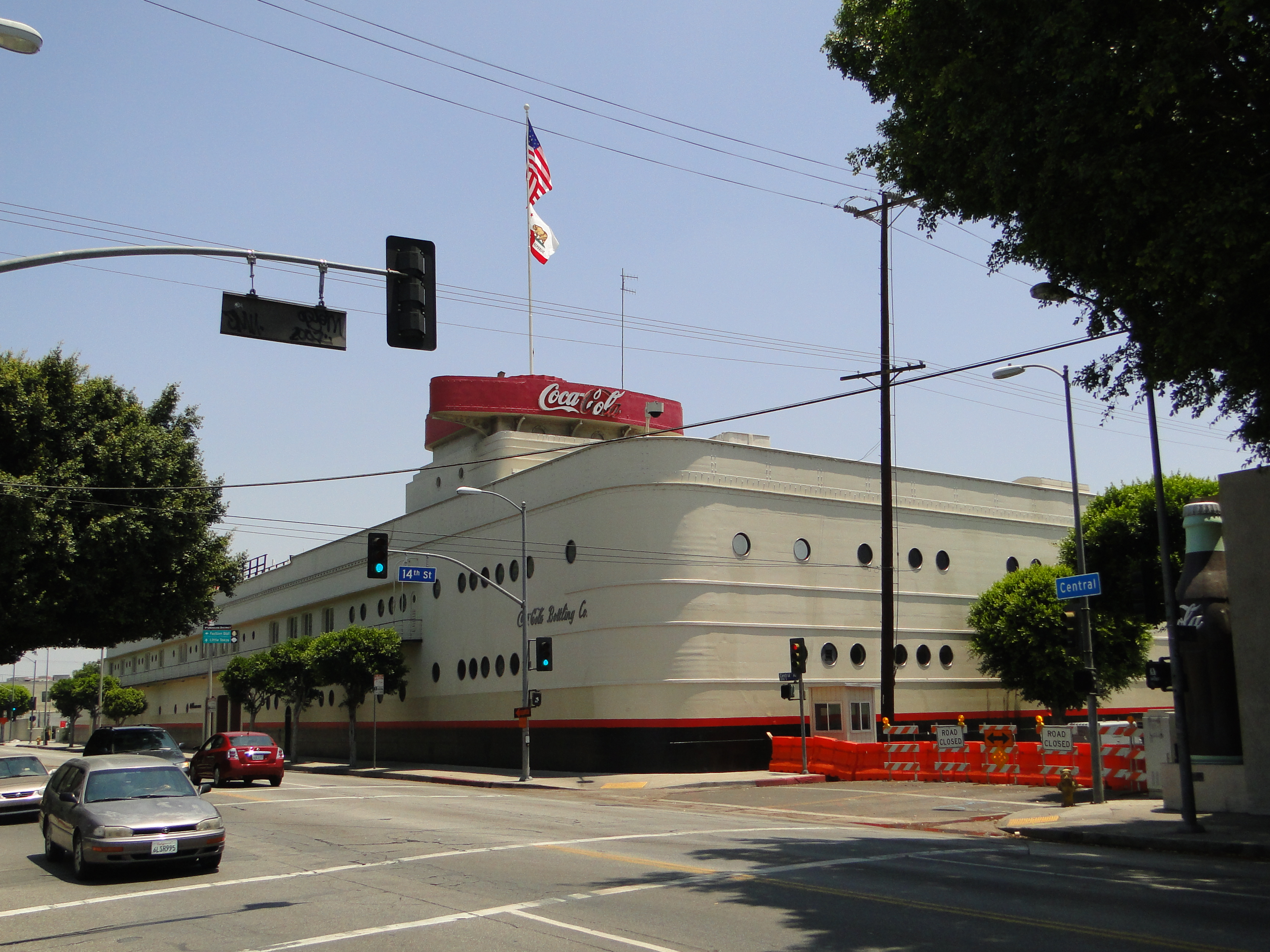
Coca-Cola Bottling Company building in Los Angeles, California

- Catawissa Bottling Company
- The Central America Bottling Corporation, Guatemala
- Coca-Cola bottlers

- Arca Continental
- Cameron Coca-Cola
- Central Bottling Company (Israel)
- Coca-Cola Andina
- Coca-Cola Amatil
- Coca-Cola Beverages Northeast
- Coca-Cola Bottlers Philippines, Inc.
- Coca-Cola Bottling Co. Consolidated
- Coca-Cola Bottling Company of Cape Cod
- Coca-Cola Bottling Company United Inc.
- Coca-Cola Embonor
- Coca-Cola European Partners
- Coca-Cola Hellenic
- Coca-Cola Içecek
- Coca-Cola Korea
- Dixie Coca-Cola Bottling Company Plant
- FEMSA
- Kirin Brewery Company
- Panamco
- Rome Coca-Cola Bottling (in the U.S. state of Georgia)
- San Miguel Corporation
- Shepparton Preserving Company
- Swire Group

- Cott

== G ==
- Gosling Brothers
- Gladstone Springhouse and Bottling Plant

== K ==
- Knox Glass Bottle Company

== M ==
- Malvern water
- Monarch Beverage, Inc., of Indianapolis, Indiana
- Monarch Beverage Company, of Atlanta, Georgia

== N ==
- National Beverage
- Natrona Bottling Company

== P ==
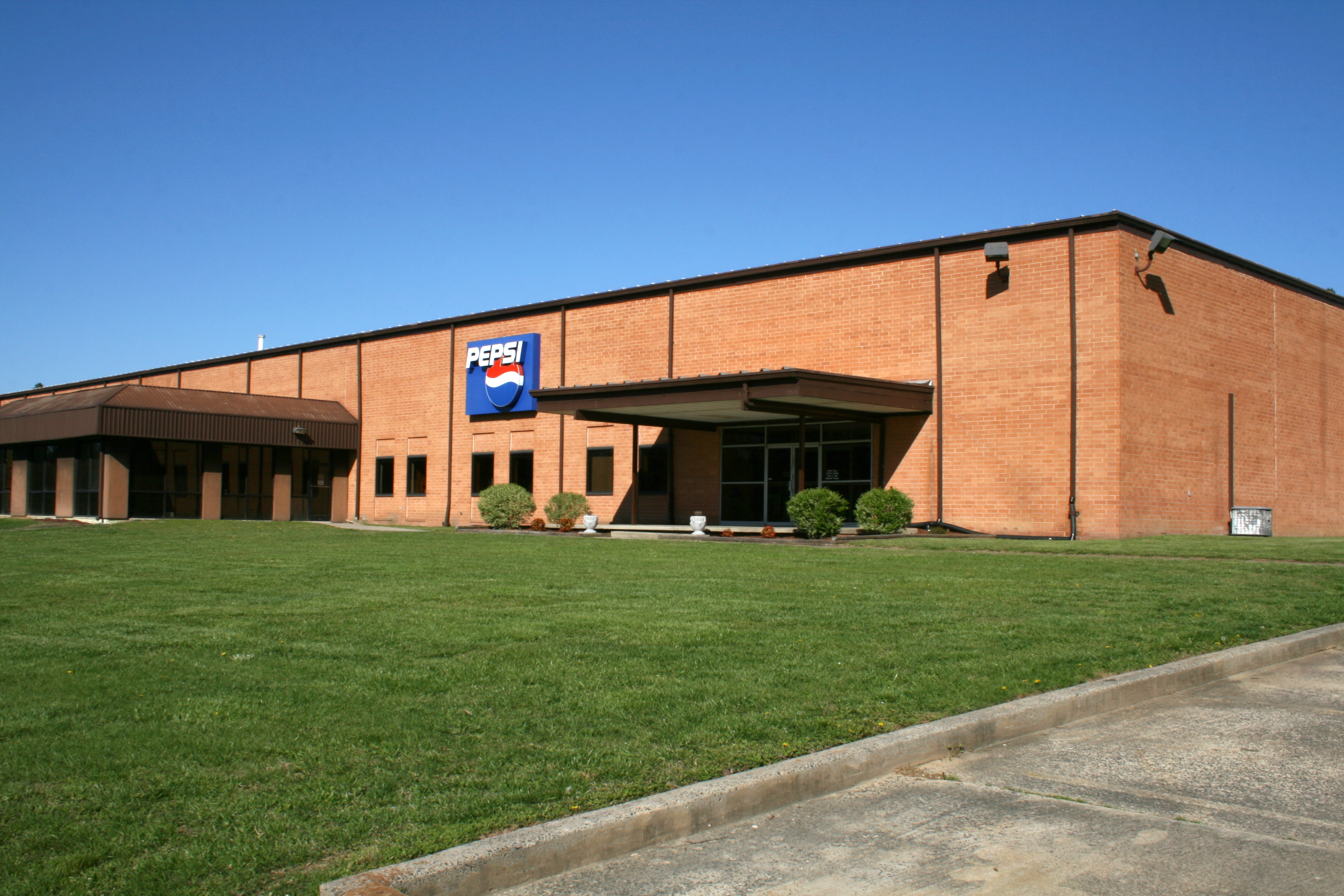
Pepsi Cola Bottling Company of Durham, North Carolina

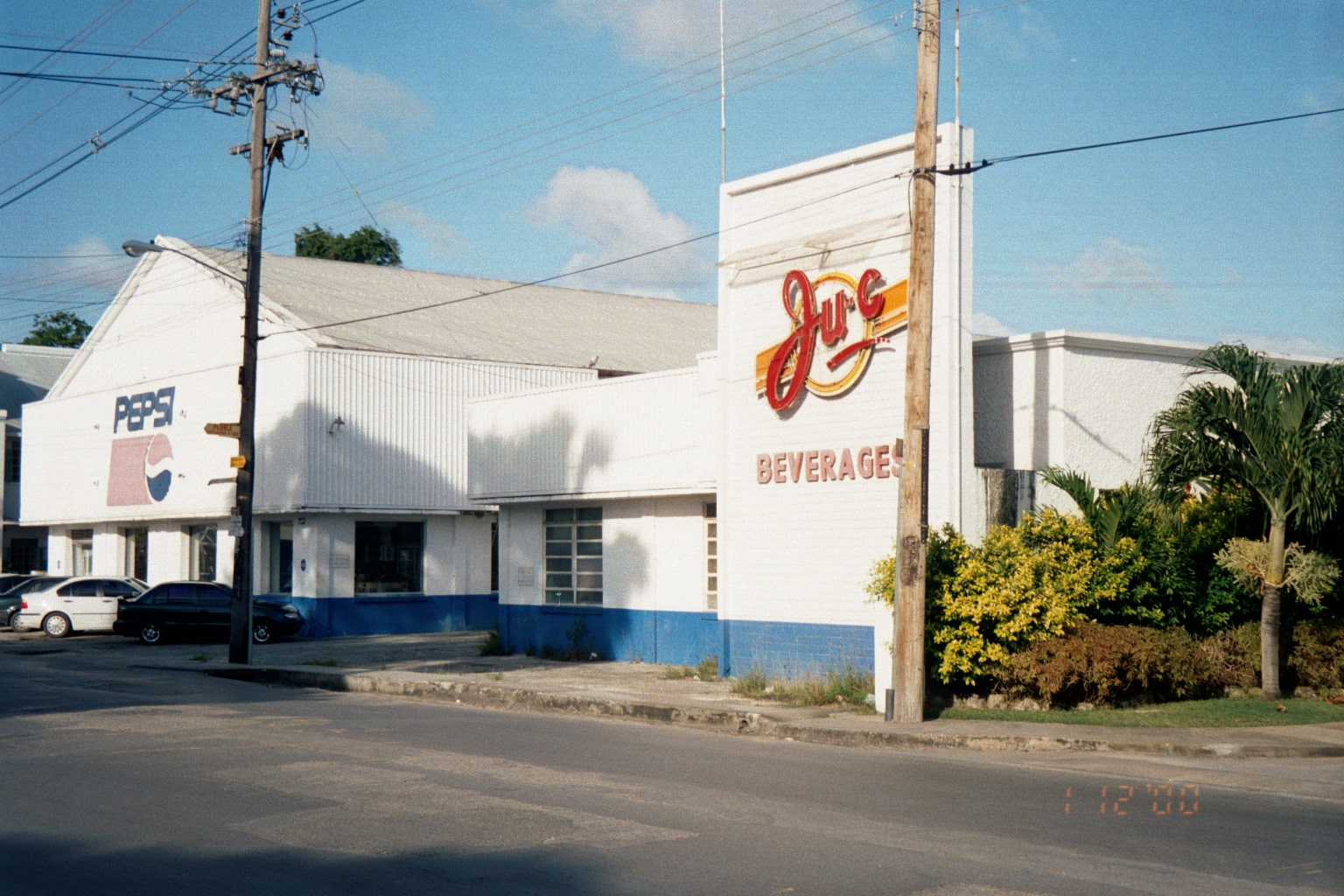
Bottlers Limited, and Pepsi-Cola Bottling Co., Ltd. bottling plant on Highway 7 in Barbados. Shown is a logo for the Barbadian soft-drink brand Ju-C. (Pronounced "Juicey")

- PepsiCo bottlers for Pepsi products

- Ahmad Hamad Al Gosaibi & Brothers
- AmBev
- Baghdad Soft Drinks Co
- Brasserie Nationale d'Haiti
- Britvic
- Buffalo Rock
- PepsiAmericas
- Pepsi Philippines
- Pepsi-Cola Canada Beverages (West) Ltd.

- R.W.D.S.U., Local 558 v. Pepsi-Cola Canada Beverages (West) Ltd.

- Quilmes Industrial S.A.
- The Pepsi Bottling Group
- Varun Beverages

- Polar Beverages

== R ==
- Rauch

== T ==
- TUBES Production Company

== V ==
- Varun Beverages

== W ==
- Wet Planet Beverages
- White Rock Beverages

== Z ==
- Zest-O Corporation

== See also ==
- Anchor bottler
- Bottling line
- List of bottle types, brands and companies
- Packaging and labeling
