= 2018 Alabama Coca-Cola strike =

Labour strike action undertaken by workers of Coca-Cola company in Alabama

- Date: August 9–20, 2018
- Location: Leroy, Alabama; Mobile, Alabama; Robertsdale, Alabama; Ocean Springs, Mississippi

Parties
Teamsters Local 991	Coca-Cola Bottling Company United

The 2018 Alabama Coca-Cola strike was a labor strike involving workers of Birmingham, Alabama-based Coca-Cola Bottling Company United in Alabama and Mississippi. The main causes of the strike were disputes over wages and cost of insurance. Starting August 9, members of the International Brotherhood of Teamsters protested what they alleged were unfair labor practices. The strike, which involved three distribution plants in Alabama and one in Mississippi, ended August 20.

== Background ==
In 2017, Coca-Cola Bottling Company United took over multiple Coca-Cola production and distribution facilities from Coca-Cola Bottling Co. Consolidated in the states of Alabama and Mississippi. Shortly after this consolidation, United announced plans to hire additional workers. However, in 2018 members of Teamsters Local 991, which represented United workers in the region, voiced disapproval of United's plans to cut the starting pay for new hires by between $5 and $7 an hour. (Note: Some sources give this figure as between $6 and $8 per hour.) Union members alleged that the pay discrepancy would hurt higher-wage earners in the company, as United would be more inclined to hire lower-paid workers to replace them. Tensions between the union and company were exacerbated on July 15, when employment contracts with union members expired. Following this, employees continued to work under a three-week extension. The union expressed concern over increased costs for insurance through the company. On August 9, the union announced a strike at four locations: Robertsdale, Leroy, and Mobile in Alabama, and Ocean Springs in Mississippi. A previous strike involving Local 991 and Consolidated had occurred about ten years earlier.

== Course of the strike ==
The strike began at 2:30 am on August 9, with the union alleging unfair labor practices from the company. Over 200 members (Note: Sources differ on the exact number, with claims of 250 and 275.) of Local 991 ceased work at three distribution plants in Alabama and one in Mississippi. Picketing occurred along U.S. Route 90 in Tillmans Corner, Alabama and Alabama State Route 104 in Baldwin County, Alabama. On August 11, the union president reported that they had not heard from the company since August 8, with the company claiming to be communicating through mediators. On August 13, union and company representatives met with a Federal mediator in an attempt to settle the dispute. On August 20, the strike ended without a contract agreement, with union members returning to work at 5 am that day. According to union members, a contract agreement seemed likely, and negotiations through a mediator were continuing.
