= Monarch Beverage =

Monarch Beverage may refer to:

- Monarch Beverage Company of Atlanta, Georgia
- Monarch Beverage, Inc. of Indianapolis, Indiana
