= Catawissa Bottling Company =

American soft drink producer

- Company type: Private
- Industry: Beverages
- Founded: March 1926
- Founder: Bruce Gregorowicz and Suzanne Wegronovich Gregorowicz
- Headquarters: Catawissa, Pennsylvania, U.S.
- Area served: North Eastern USA
- Products: Moxie; Double Cola; Big Ben (various flavors)
- Services: Bottling

Catawissa Bottling Company is a producer of soft drinks located in Catawissa, Pennsylvania. The company also distributes beer, ice, cups, taps, and related items.

Catawissa Bottling Company was formed in 1926, when the Pennsylvania Department of Agriculture issued a license to bottle soda to Bruce Gregorowicz and his wife Suzanne Wegronovich Gregorowicz. The couple purchased a creamery in Catawissa and converted it to a bottling facility.

The original flavors of soda produced by the company included orange soda, lemon soda, birch beer, root beer, lime cloud, lemon sour, cream soda, strawberry, ginger ale, grape, cherry, sarsaparilla, white birch beer, orangeade, raspberry, teaberry, lemonade, uffri cola, celery cola, pop, and still grape. Flavors added later include golden birch beer, root beer, cream soda, sarsaparilla, cola, and blue birch beer.

The company uses cane sugar in their proprietary sodas rather than high fructose corn syrup, and markets them under the brands "Catawissa Sparkling Beverages" and "Big Ben's".

Catawissa Bottling Company produced the Moxie brand of soda under license from 1945 to 1967. In 1978, the company again contracted to produce Moxie, which it continues to produce to this day in addition to selling Moxie collectibles and paraphernalia.

== See also ==
- List of bottling companies
