= Varun Beverages =

Indian organization

Varun Beverages Limited
- Type: Public
- Traded as: NSE: VBL; BSE: 540180
- Industry: Food and beverage
- Founded: 1995; 31 years ago
- Headquarters: Gurgaon, Haryana, India
- Area served: India; Nepal; Sri Lanka; Madagascar; Democratic Republic of Congo; Morocco; Mozambique; Zambia; Zimbabwe; South Africa; Botswana; Namibia
- Key people: Ravi Jaipuria (Founder-Chairman)
- Revenue: ▲₹21,685 crore (US$2.3 billion) (CY2025)
- Operating income: ▲₹5,070 crore (US$540 million) (CY2025)
- Net income: ▲₹3,062 crore (US$330 million) (CY2025)
- Number of employees: 10,000+ (2024)
- Parent: RJ Corp
- Subsidiaries: The Beverage Company; Varun Beverages Morocco; Varun Beverages Lanka (Pvt) Ltd; Lunarmech Technologies Pvt Ltd
- Website: varunbeverages.com

Varun Beverages Limited (VBL) is an Indian multinational company that manufactures, bottles and distributes beverages. It is the largest bottling company of PepsiCo's beverages in the world outside the United States. The company was incorporated in 1995 as a subsidiary of RJ Corp, and named after founder Ravi Jaipuria's son.

Apart from carbonated soft drinks of PepsiCo such as Pepsi, 7 Up, Mountain Dew and Mirinda, the company distributes Tropicana and Tropicana Slice fruit juice brands, Gatorade sports-themed beverages, Sting energy drinks, Creambell milkshakes, Duke's club soda, Lipton ready-to-drink ice tea, and Aquafina brand of bottled water. As of 2019, Varun Beverages is PepsiCo bottler in 27 states and 7 union territories of India. The company also manufactures and distributes its products in Nepal, Sri Lanka, Morocco, Mozambique, Zambia, Zimbabwe, Democratic Republic of Congo, Madagascar, South Africa, Lesotho, Eswatini, Namibia, and Botswana.

In 2022, VBL entered into an agreement to manufacture Kurkure Puffcorn for PepsiCo India Holdings.

In 2022, 70% volumes came from selling Carbonated Soft Drinks (CSDs), 23% volumes came from selling packages of drinking water, and the rest 7% volumes came from selling Non-Carbonated Beverages (NCBs). 81% of volume came from India and the rest internationally.

In December 2023, Varun Beverages acquired PepsiCo's South African bottler Bevco for ₹1,320 crore.

In April 2024, Varun Beverages started manufacturing soft drinks at its Gorakhpur facility.

In November 2024, Varun Beverages announced acquisitions of SBC Beverages Tanzania Limited (SBCT) for ₹1304 crore, SBC Beverages Ghana Limited (SBCG) for ₹127 crore, and a 39.93% stake in Lunarmech Technologies Pvt Ltd for ₹200 crore.

In December 2025, Varun Beverages announced the acquisition of a 100% stake in South African soft drinks company Twizza through its South African subsidiary, at an enterprise value of ZAR 2,095 million (approximately ₹1,118 crore).

== See also ==
- List of bottling companies
