= Brænne =

Brænne is a Norwegian surname. Notable people with the surname include:

== People ==
- Bendik Brænne (born 1987), Norwegian musician
- Berit Brænne (1918–1976), Norwegian actress and writer
- Bernhard Brænne (1854–1927), Norwegian businessman and politician
- Randi Brænne (1911–2004), Norwegian actress
- Trond Brænne (1953–2013), Norwegian actor, writer and radio personality

== Other ==
- Brænne Mineralvatn, Norwegian bottling company
