= Natrona Bottling Company =

American soft drink bottling company

- Type: Private
- Industry: Beverage / Bottling
- Founded: 1904; 122 years ago
- Founder: Ed Welsh
- Headquarters: Natrona, Pennsylvania, United States
- Area served: Western Pennsylvania
- Products: Soft drink
- Website: www.natronabottling.com

Natrona Bottling Company (founded as the Natrona Bottling Works) is an independently-owned soft drink bottling company in Harrison Township, Allegheny County, Pennsylvania, that produces a line of soft drinks that uses cane sugar and is packaged in glass bottles. Located approximately 24 miles (39 km) northeast of Pittsburgh, the company is the last glass soda pop bottling company in Allegheny County.

== History ==
The company was founded as the Natrona Bottling Works in 1904 by Ed Welsh, and was purchased by the Bowser family in 1939, who changed the name to the Natrona Bottling Company. John Bowser hired his 15-year-old brother Paul, who worked at the company after school and on weekends. Paul operated and later owned the company – for a combined seventy years – until his death in 2008.

== Flavors ==
The Natrona Bottling Company produces a line named Red Ribbon, including Red Ribbon Original Cherry Supreme, Red Ribbon Home Brewed Style Root Beer, and Red Ribbon Sodium Free Grape. Other flavors include Plantation Style Mint Julep, non-carbonated grape flavored Pennsylvania Punch (similar to Delaware Punch), spicy Jamaica’s Finest Ginger Beer, and Bauser Champayno, a non-alcoholic champagne-like beverage.

== See also ==
- List of bottling companies
