= Ravi Jaipuria =

Indian entrepreneur

- Born: Ravi Kant Jaipuria; 28 November 1954 (age 71); Delhi, India
- Other name: RJ
- Occupation: Businessman
- Organization(s): RJ Corp, Devyani International, Varun Beverages, Creambell, J-Mart
- Children: 2
- Father: Chunilal Jaipuria

Ravi Kant Jaipuria (born 28 November 1954) is an Indian businessman, who is the chairman of RJ Corp. Under his company, RJ Corp, he manages Varun Beverages which is one of the largest bottling partner for PepsiCo's soft drink brands outside the US, and Devyani International, which is India's largest franchisee of Yum! Brands and operates KFC, Pizza Hut, Costa Coffee and TWG Tea outlets. He is referred to as India's cola king.

== Education and career ==
Jaipuria studied business management in the United States and returned to India in 1985. He joined the family business as a bottler for Pepsi-Cola. He also holds a minority stake in Medanta, a health care firm. In 2013, Jaipuria, through his company Varun Bevrages, took over his brother CK Jaipuria’s Pepsi products manufacturing and marketing business in Delhi.

Varun Beverages got listed on BSE and NSE after an initial public offering in 2016. Devyani International got listed on the BSE and NSE after its IPO in 2021. In October 2024, Jaipuria was ranked 14th on the Forbes list of India’s 100 richest tycoons, with a net worth of $17.3 billion.

== Personal life ==
He is married to Dhara Jaipuria. They have two children, a son Varun and a daughter Devyani. He hails from a Marwari Hindu family.

== Recognition ==
- Ravi Jaipuria was awarded the Bottler of the Year by PepsiCo in 1999. He received the award from former US President George H. W. Bush.
- According to Forbes, Ravi Jaipuria ranked #83 in Forbes's India Rich List in 2016.
- He was placed #73 in Forbes's India Rich List in 2015, #60 in Forbes's India Rich List 2014 and #47 in Forbes's India Rich List 2013.
