= Wrentham Village Premium Outlets =

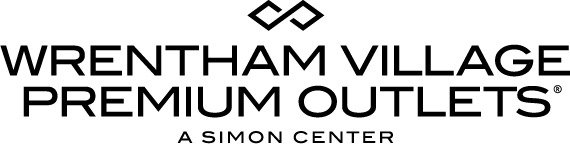
- Location: Wrentham, Massachusetts, United States
- Coordinates: 42.038313°N 71.352682°W
- Address: 1 Premium Outlet Boulevard
- Opened: 1997
- Manager: Simon's Premium Outlets
- Owner: Simon Property Group
- Num. of stores: 170
- Floor area: 616,000 ft^{2} (57,200 m^{2})
- Floors: 1
- Website: www.premiumoutlets.com/outlet/wrentham-village

The Wrentham Village Premium Outlets is an open-air outlet power center owned by the Simon Property Group. It is located off I-495 and Route 1A in Wrentham, Massachusetts. The facility opened in 1997, and was expanded in 1998, 1999, and 2000. With 616,000 ft^{2} (57,200 m^{2}) and 170 retailers, it has been credited as the reason for the downfall of the nearby, smaller Worcester Common Outlets, which closed in 2006, as well as the Cape Cod Factory Outlet Mall, which closed in 2011. In September 2018, the Simon Property Group began a multiphase and multimillion-dollar renovation of the center.

== 2018-2020 renovation project ==
In September 2018, the Simon Property Group began a renovation of the center. The project, which is set to be completed by the end of 2019, will include new landscaping and lighting, signage, digital directories, and other improvements. As of March 2020, work on Wrentham St, Colonial Court, Heritage Court, and Liberty Court has been completed. Work is currently underway on Patriot Court and Freedom Court and work is ongoing throughout the center.
