= Bottle =

Narrow-necked container

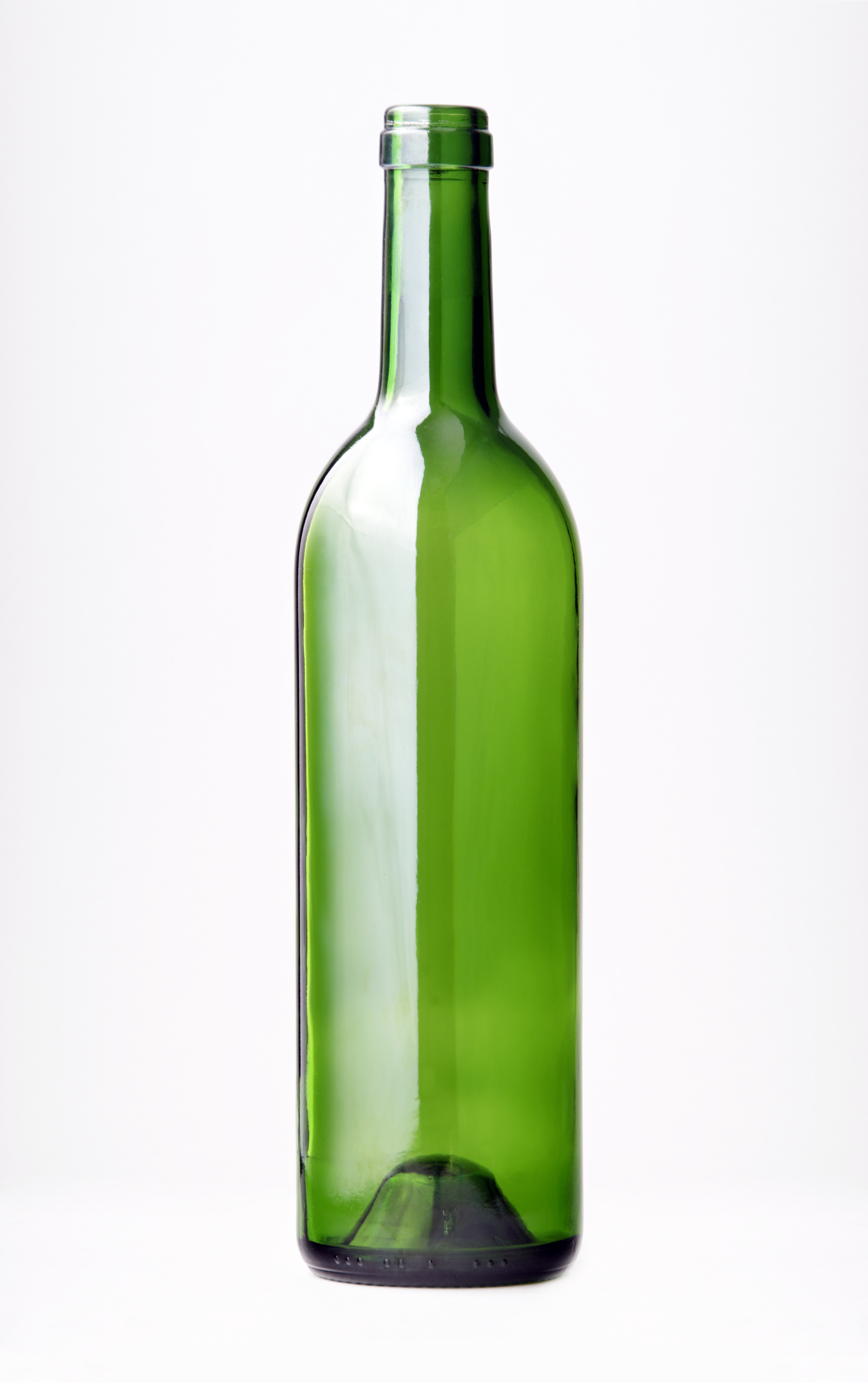
A classic wine bottle

A bottle is a narrow-necked container made of an impermeable material such as glass, pottery, porcelain, plastic or aluminium, in various shapes and sizes that stores and transports liquids. Its mouth, at the bottling line, can be sealed with an internal stopper, an external bottle cap, a closure, or induction sealing.

== Etymology ==
First attested in 14th century. The English word bottle derives from an Old French word boteille, from vulgar Latin butticula, from late Latin buttis ("cask"), a latinisation of the Greek βοῦττις (bouttis) ("vessel").

== Types ==
=== Glass ===
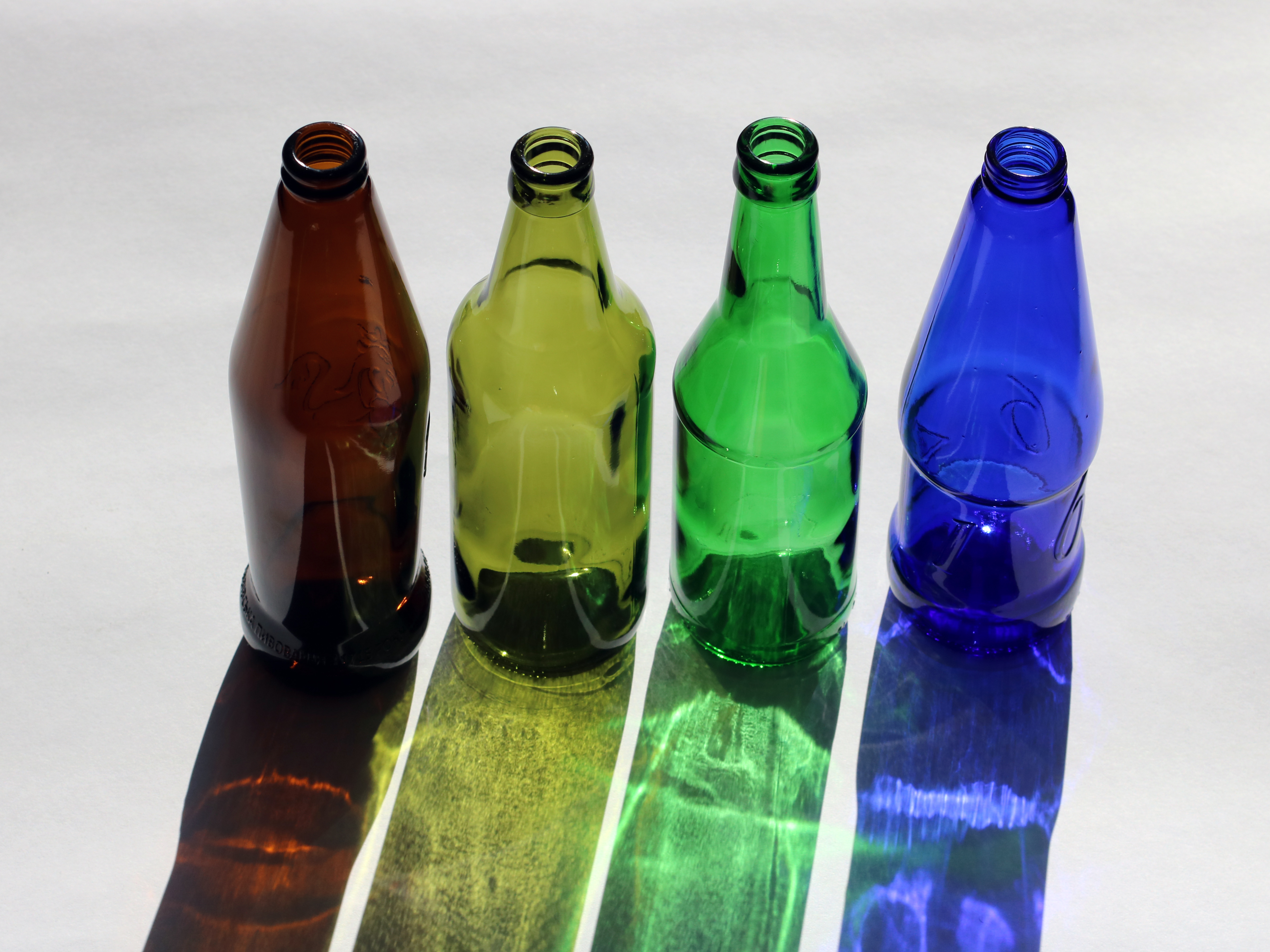
Empty beer bottles of different colors

==== Wine ====
The glass bottle represented an important development in the history of wine, because, when combined with a high-quality stopper such as a cork, it allowed long-term aging of wine. Glass has all the qualities required for long-term storage. It eventually gave rise to "château bottling", the practice where an estate's wine is put in a bottle at the source, rather than by a merchant. Prior to this, wine used to be sold by the barrel (and before that, the amphora) and put into bottles only at the merchant's shop, if at all. This left large and often abused opportunities for fraud and adulteration, as consumers had to trust the merchant as to the contents. It is thought that most wine consumed outside of wine-producing regions had been tampered with in some way. Also, not all merchants were careful to avoid oxidation or contamination while bottling, leading to large bottle variation. Particularly in the case of port, certain conscientious merchants' bottling of old ports fetch higher prices even today. To avoid these problems, most fine wine is bottled at the place of production (including all port, since 1974).

There are many sizes and shapes of bottles used for wine. Some of the known shapes:

- "Bordeaux": This bottle is straight-sided with a curved "shoulder" that is useful for catching sediment and is also the easiest to stack. Traditionally used in Bordeaux but now worldwide, this is the most common type.
- "Burgundy": Traditionally used in Burgundy, this has sides that taper down about 2/3 of the height to a short cylindrical section, and does not have a shoulder.
- "Champagne": Traditionally used for Champagne, it is similar to a Burgundy bottle, but with a wider base and heavier construction to withstand the pressure from the carbonation of the sparkling wine.

==== Codd-neck ====
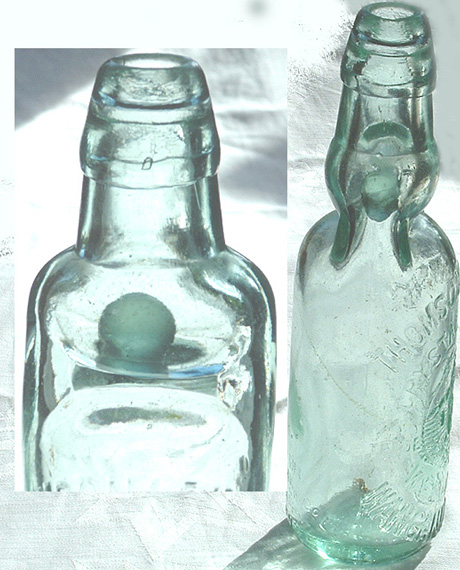
Codd-neck bottle

In 1872, British soft drink makers Hiram Codd of Camberwell, London, designed and patented a bottle designed specifically for carbonated drinks. The Codd-neck bottle was designed and manufactured to enclose a marble and a rubber washer/gasket in the neck. The bottles were filled upside down, and pressure of the gas in the bottle forced the marble against the washer, sealing in the carbonation. The bottle was pinched into a special shape, as can be seen in the photo to the left, to provide a chamber into which the marble was pushed to open the bottle. This prevented the marble from blocking the neck as the drink was poured.

Soon after its introduction, the bottle became extremely popular with the soft drink and brewing industries, mainly in Europe, Asia and Australasia, though some alcohol drinkers disdained the use of the bottle. One etymology of the term codswallop originates from beer sold in Codd bottles, though this is generally dismissed as a folk etymology.

The bottles were regularly produced for many decades, but gradually declined in usage. Since children smashed the bottles to retrieve the marbles, they are relatively scarce and have become collector items; particularly in the UK. A cobalt-coloured Codd bottle today fetches hundreds of British pounds at auction. The Codd-neck design is still used for the Japanese soft drink Ramune and in the Indian drink called Banta.

=== Plastic ===
The plastic is strain oriented in the stretch blow molding manufacturing process. Plastic bottles are typically used to store liquids such as water, soft drinks, motor oil, cooking oil, medicine, shampoo, milk, and ink. The size ranges from very small sample bottles to very large carboys. The main advantages of plastic bottles over glass are their superior resistance to breakage, in both production and transportation, as well as their light weight and low cost of production. Disadvantages include widespread plastic pollution.

=== Aluminium ===
An aluminium bottle is a bottle made of aluminium (or aluminum, outside of British English). In some countries, it is also called a "bottlecan". It usually holds beer, soft drinks or wine.

=== Hot water ===
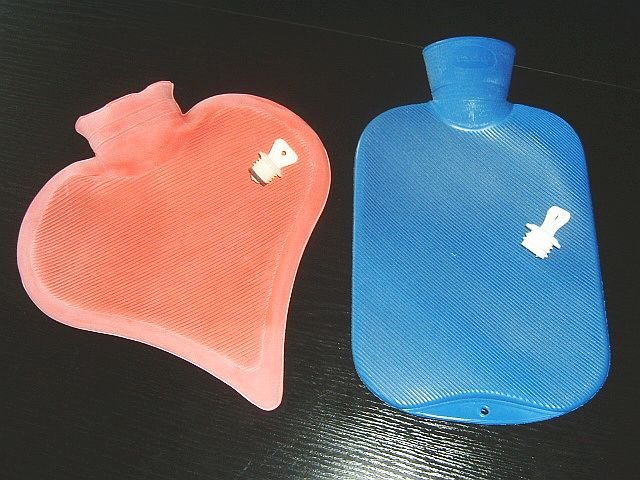
Two modern hot water bottles shown with their stoppers

A hot water bottle is a bottle filled with hot water used to provide warmth. It can be made from various materials, most commonly rubber, but has historically been made from harder materials such as metal, glass, earthenware, or wood.

== Gallery ==
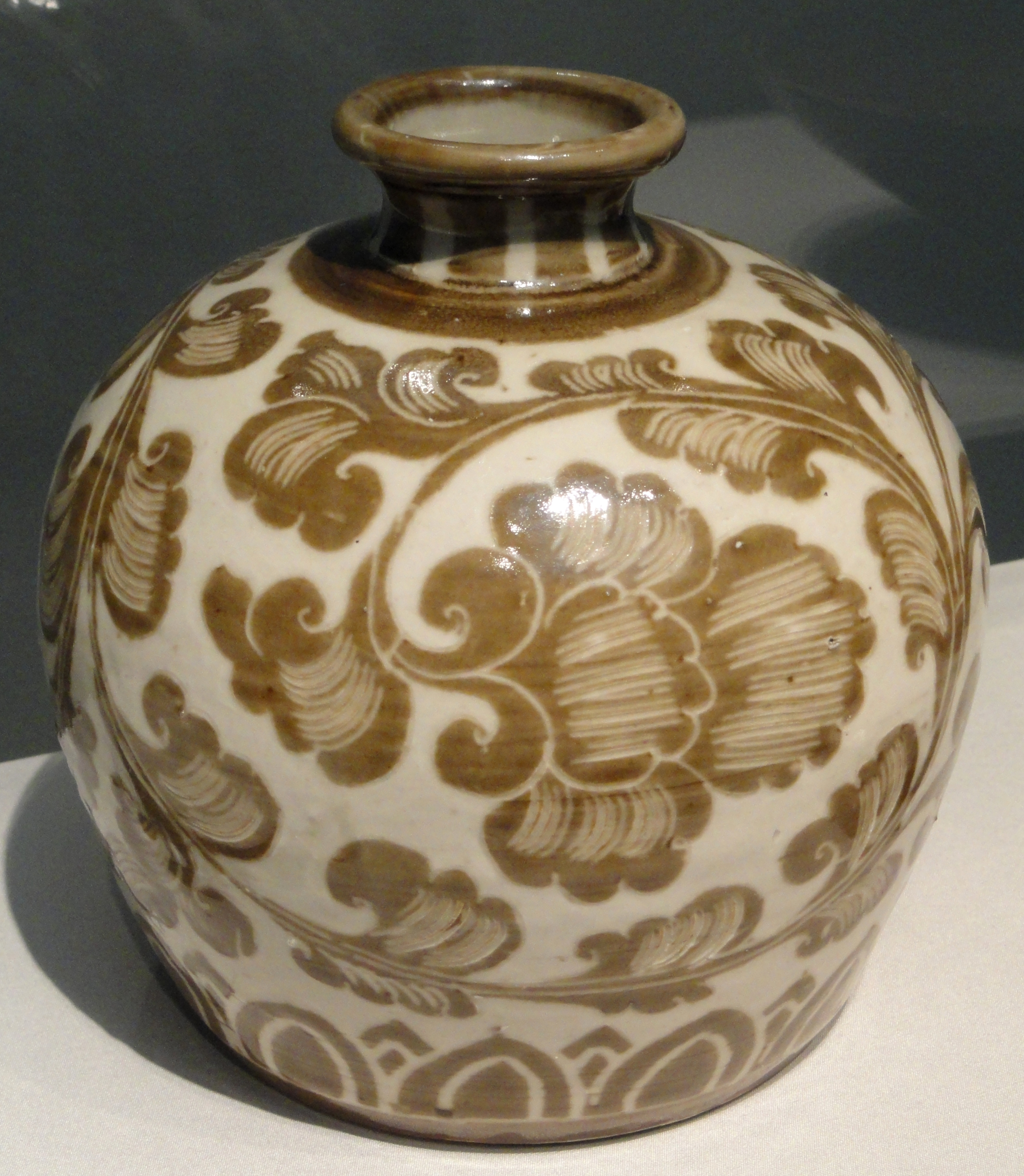
Chinese ding-ware porcelain bottle, 11th century, Song dynasty

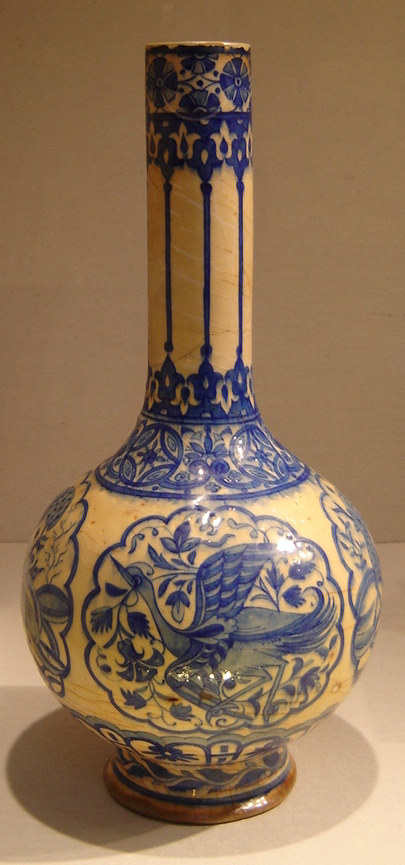
Composite body, painted, and glazed bottle. Dated 16th century Iran.

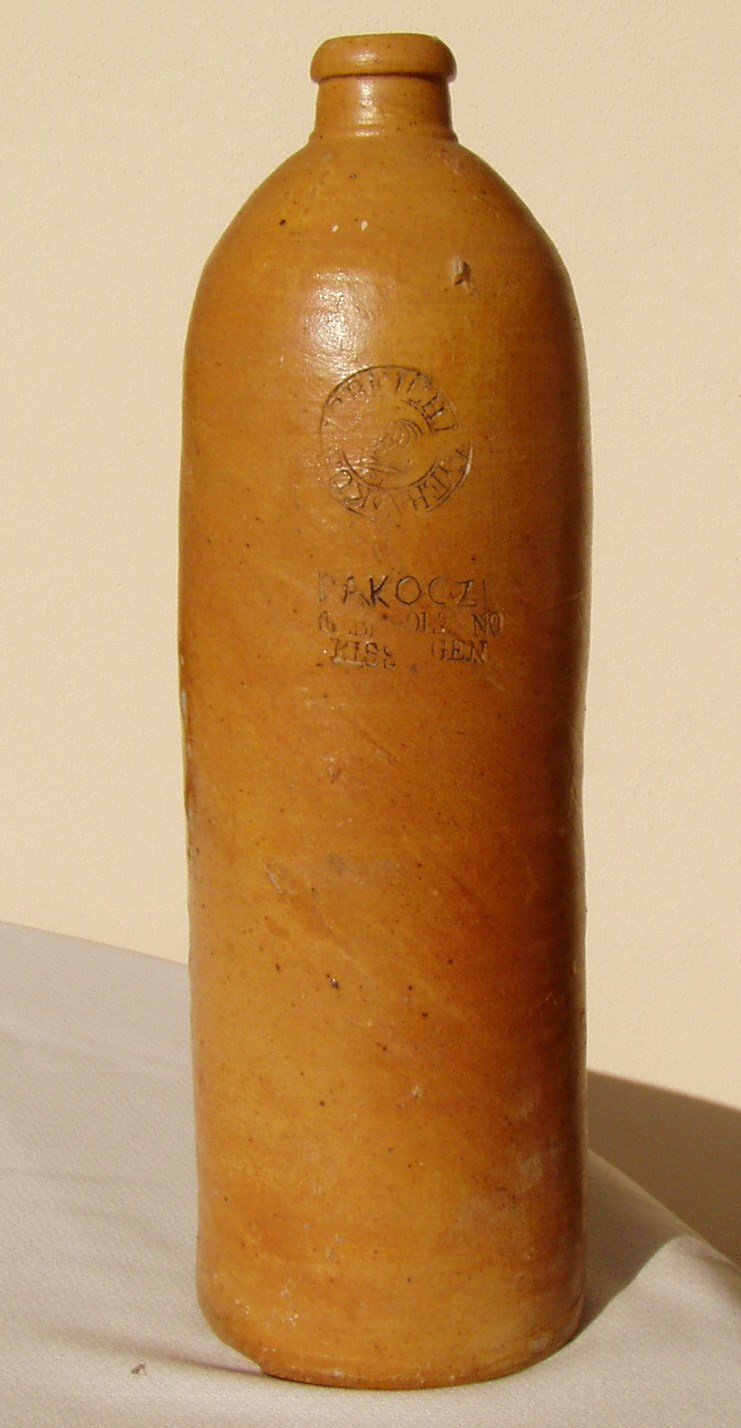
Stone ware jar for carrying water.

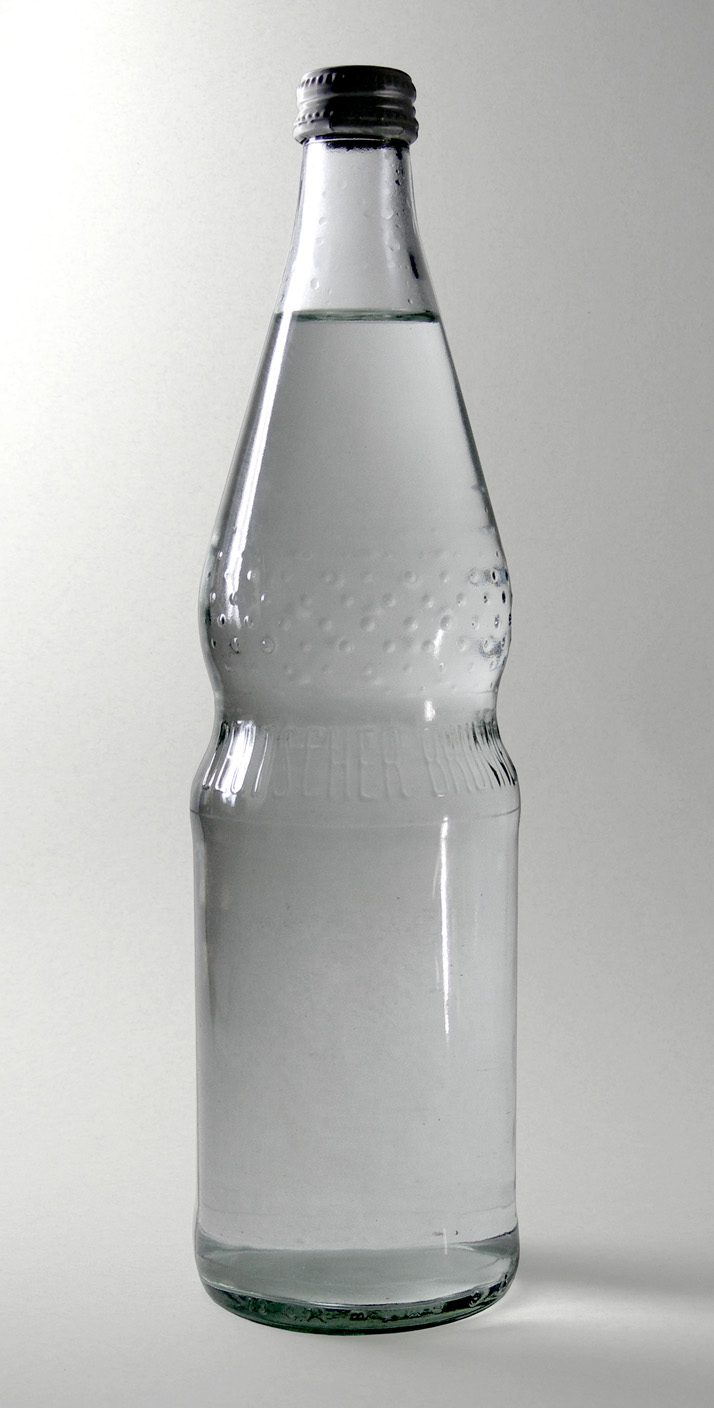
Normflasche bottle

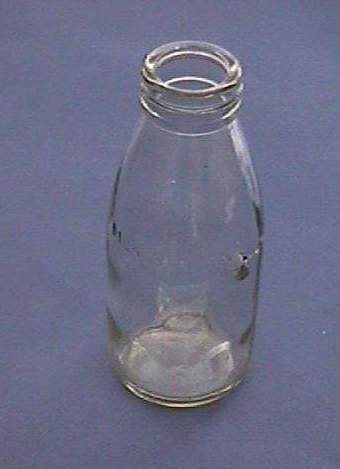
Reusable glass milk bottle

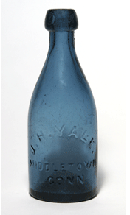
Excavated pontiled soda or beer "blobtop" bottle, circa 1855

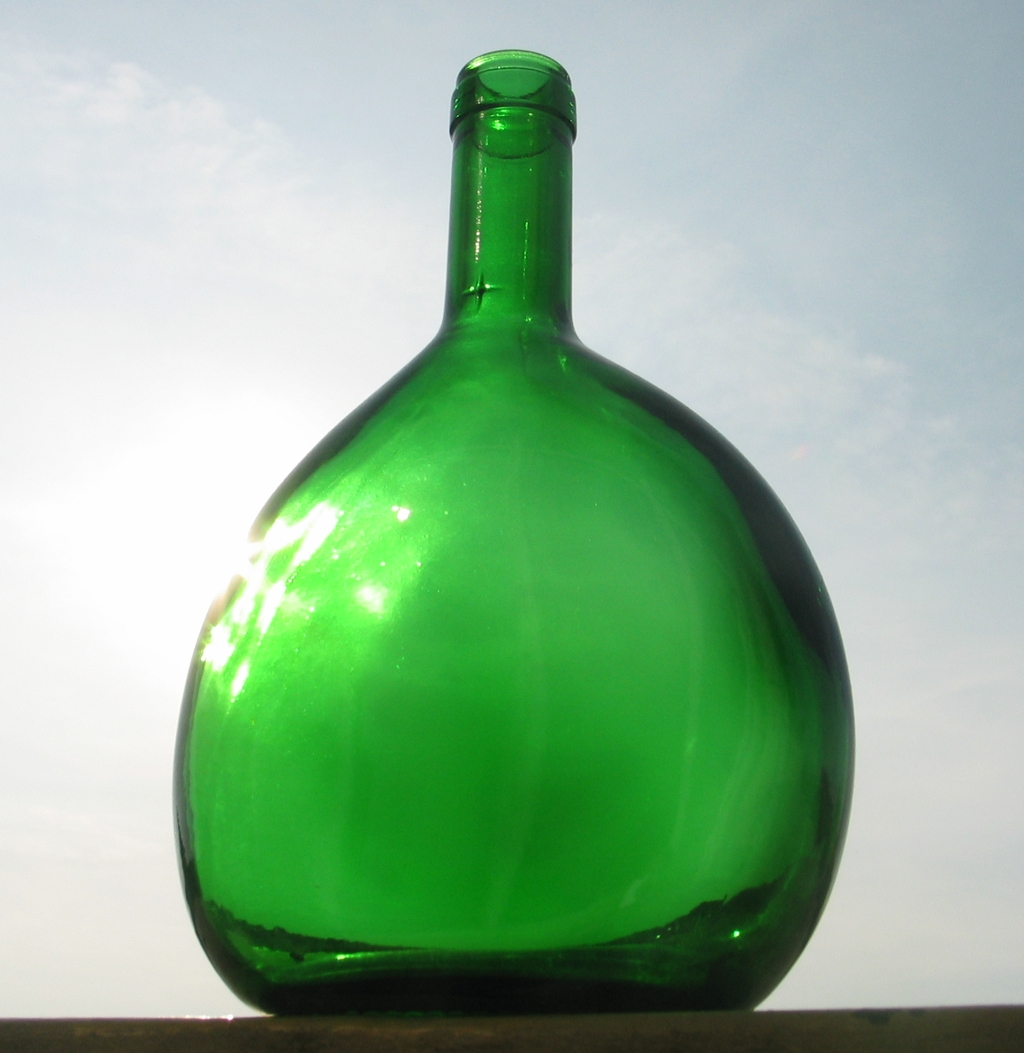
Bocksbeutel bottle

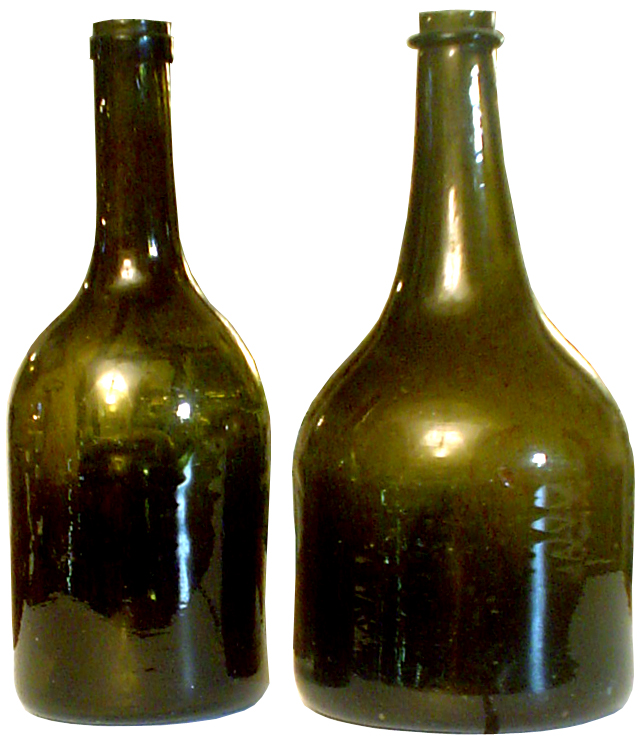
Two bottles for Maas wine, called "thieves", 18th century

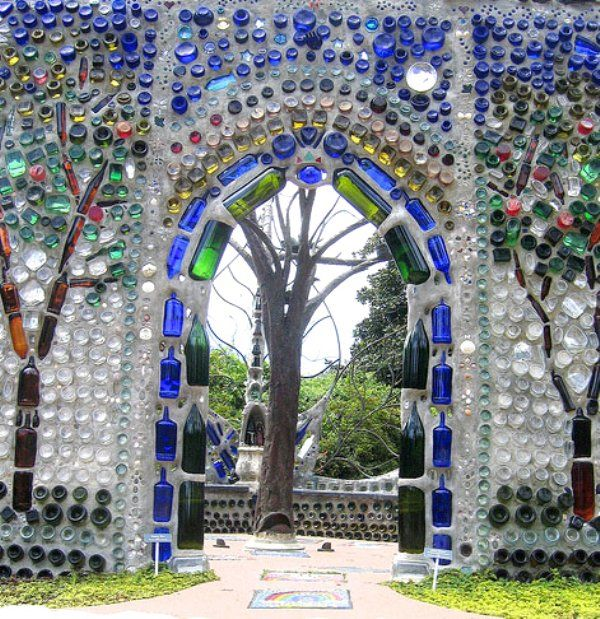
A bottle wall

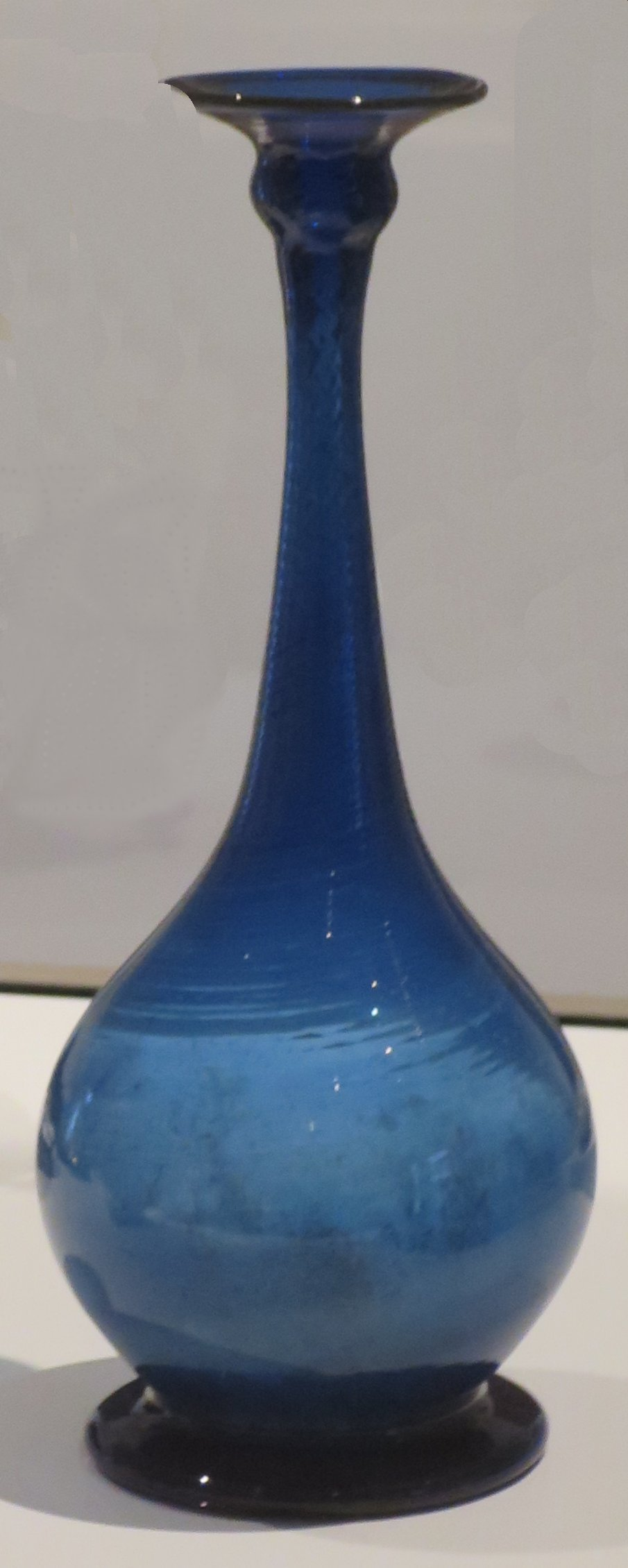
Blue glass bottle, 18th–19th-century Iran

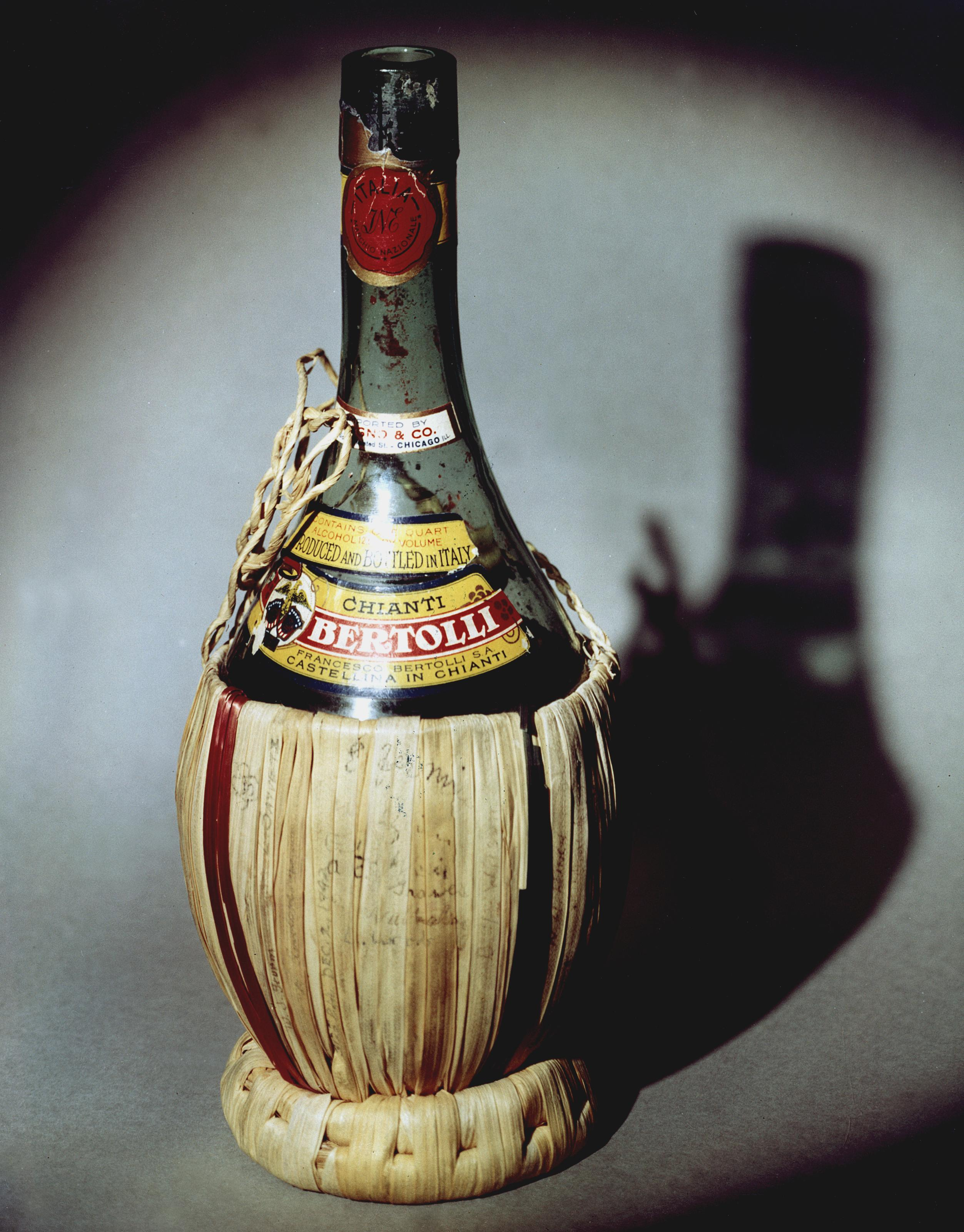
1940s Chianti fiasco

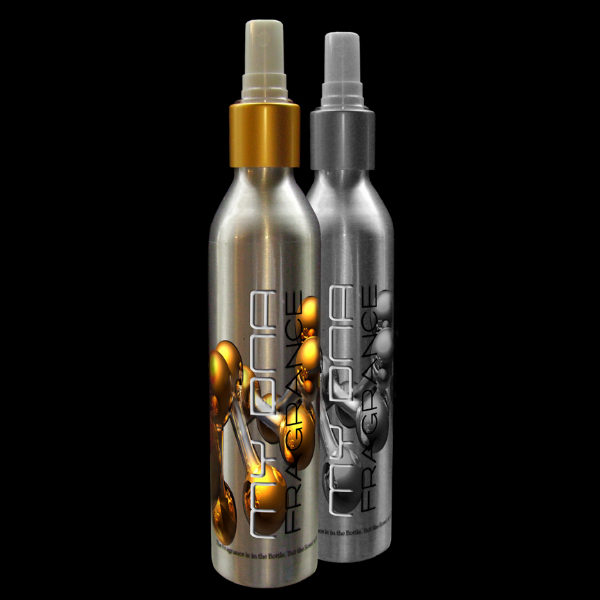
Aluminium spray bottle

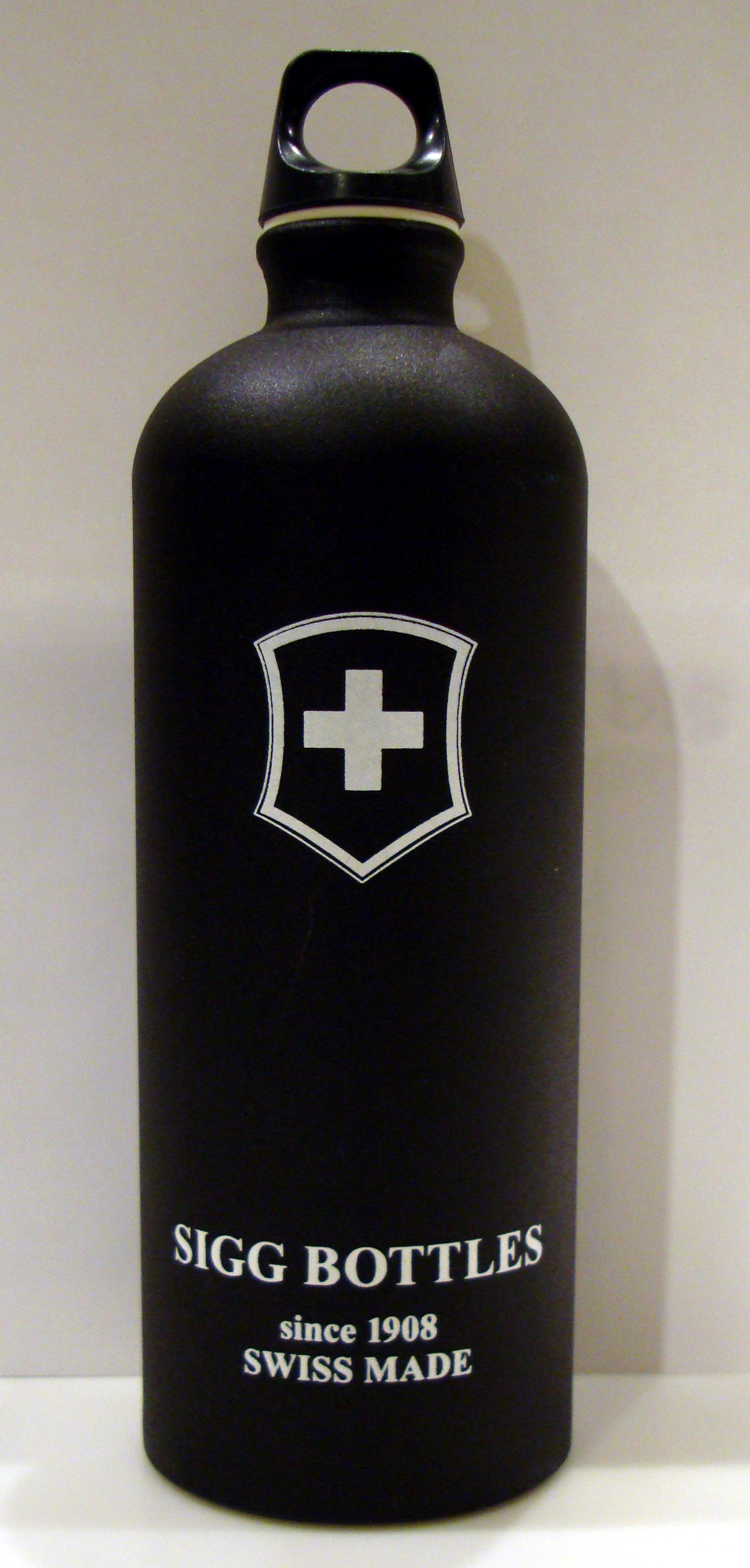
A contemporary metal bottle (Sigg)

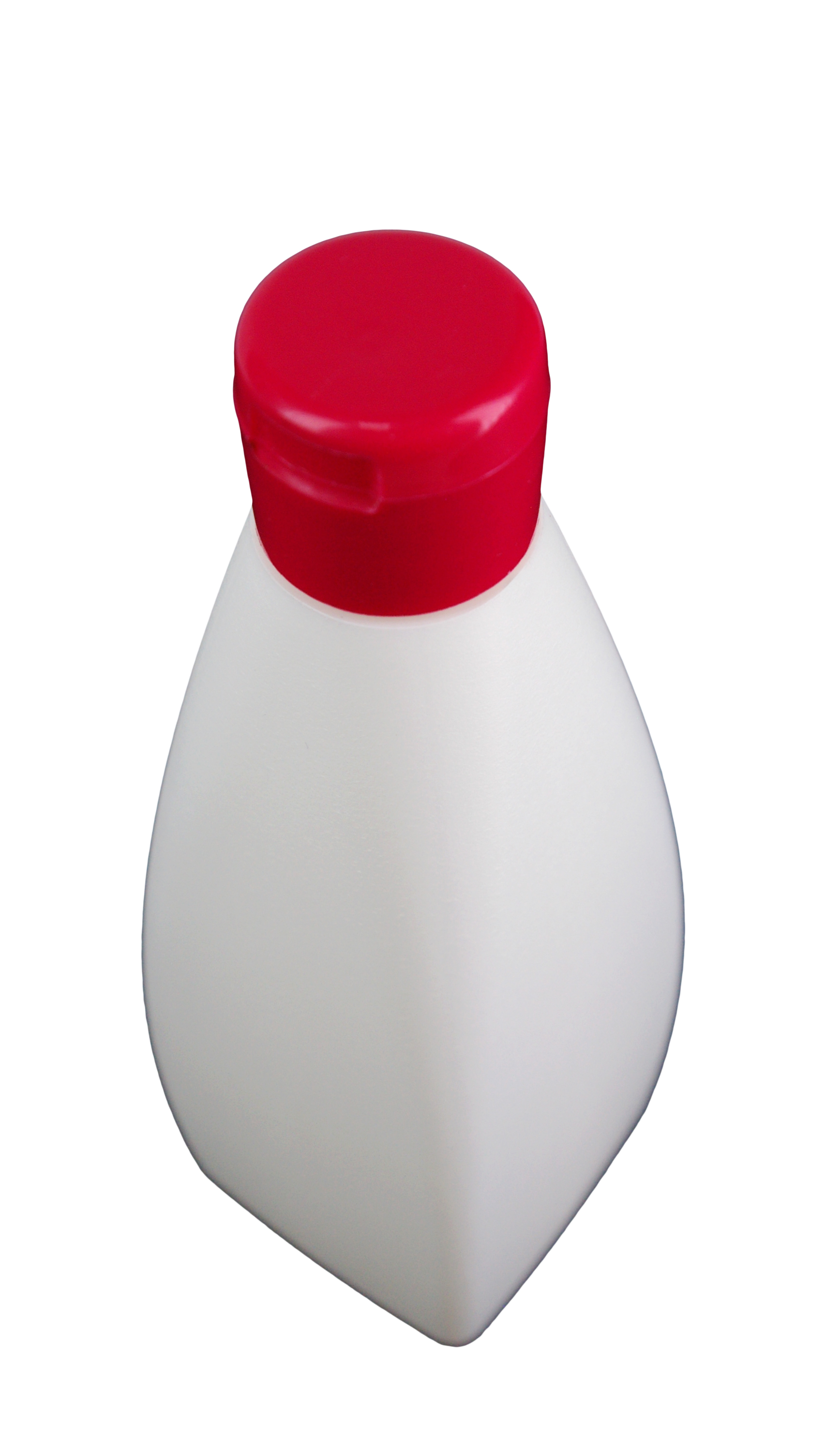
A bioplastic shampoo bottle made of PLA-blend bio-flex

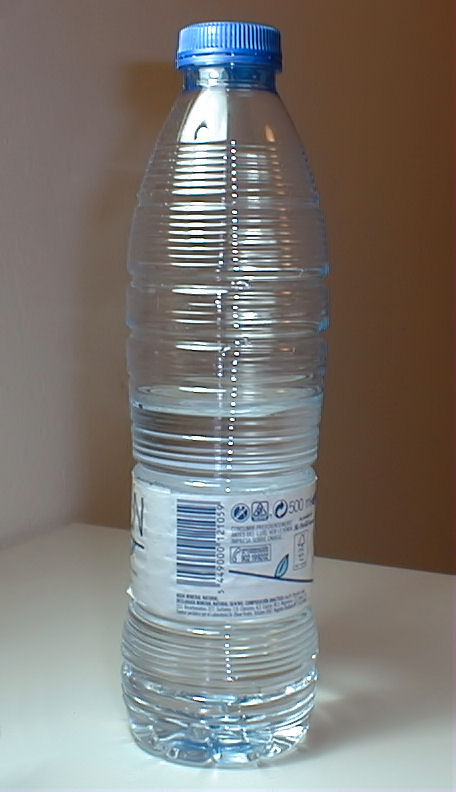
A PET bottle

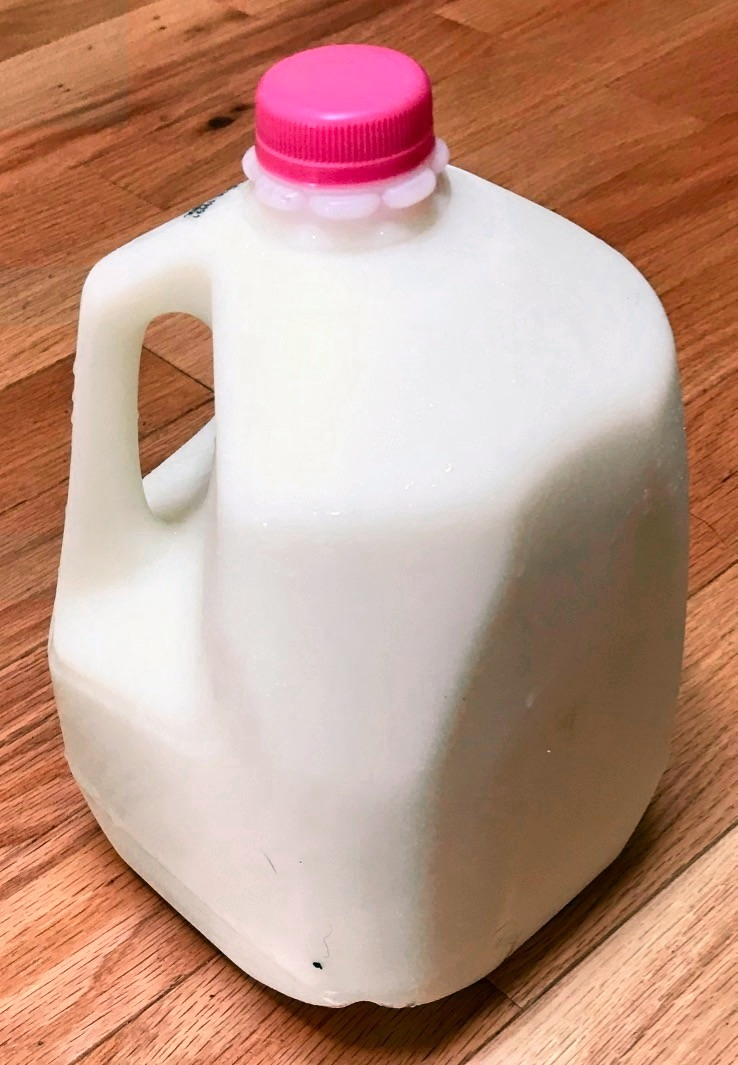
Plastic bottle of milk. One US gallon

== Miscellany ==
Bottles are often recycled according to the SPI recycling code for the material.

== See also ==
- Beer bottle
- Bottle sling
- Bottle wall
- Bottling company
- Bottling (concert abuse)
- Carinate
- Glass production
- Helmholtz resonance
- Klein bottle
- List of bottle types, brands and companies
- List of bottling companies
- Reuse of bottles
- Speyer wine bottle
