= J. Frank Harrison III =

American heir and businessman

J. Frank Harrison III is an American heir and businessman. He is the chief executive officer and chairman of Coca-Cola Bottling Co. Consolidated (Nasdaq: COKE).

== Biography ==
=== Early life ===
J. Frank Harrison III is the great-grandson of J. B. Harrison, founder of Coca-Cola Bottling Co. Consolidated. He graduated from the University of North Carolina at Chapel Hill in Chapel Hill, North Carolina and received a Master's in Business Administration from Duke University in Durham, North Carolina in 1983.

=== Career ===
He started his career at Coca-Cola Bottling Co. Consolidated as division sales manager and vice president in 1977. He was appointed to its board of directors in 1986, and served as its vice chairman from November 1987 to December 1996. Since 1996, he has served as its chairman and chief executive officer.

He serves on the board of directors of the American Beverage Association. Additionally, he has served on the board of directors of Wachovia (now Wells Fargo).

=== Personal life ===
He is married to Jan Harrison. They reside in Charlotte, North Carolina. He is a practicing Christian. He founded a ministry called With Open Eyes in Sudan, where his late son, J. Frank Harrison IV, died while working there as a missionary.
