= Cape Cod Factory Outlet Mall =

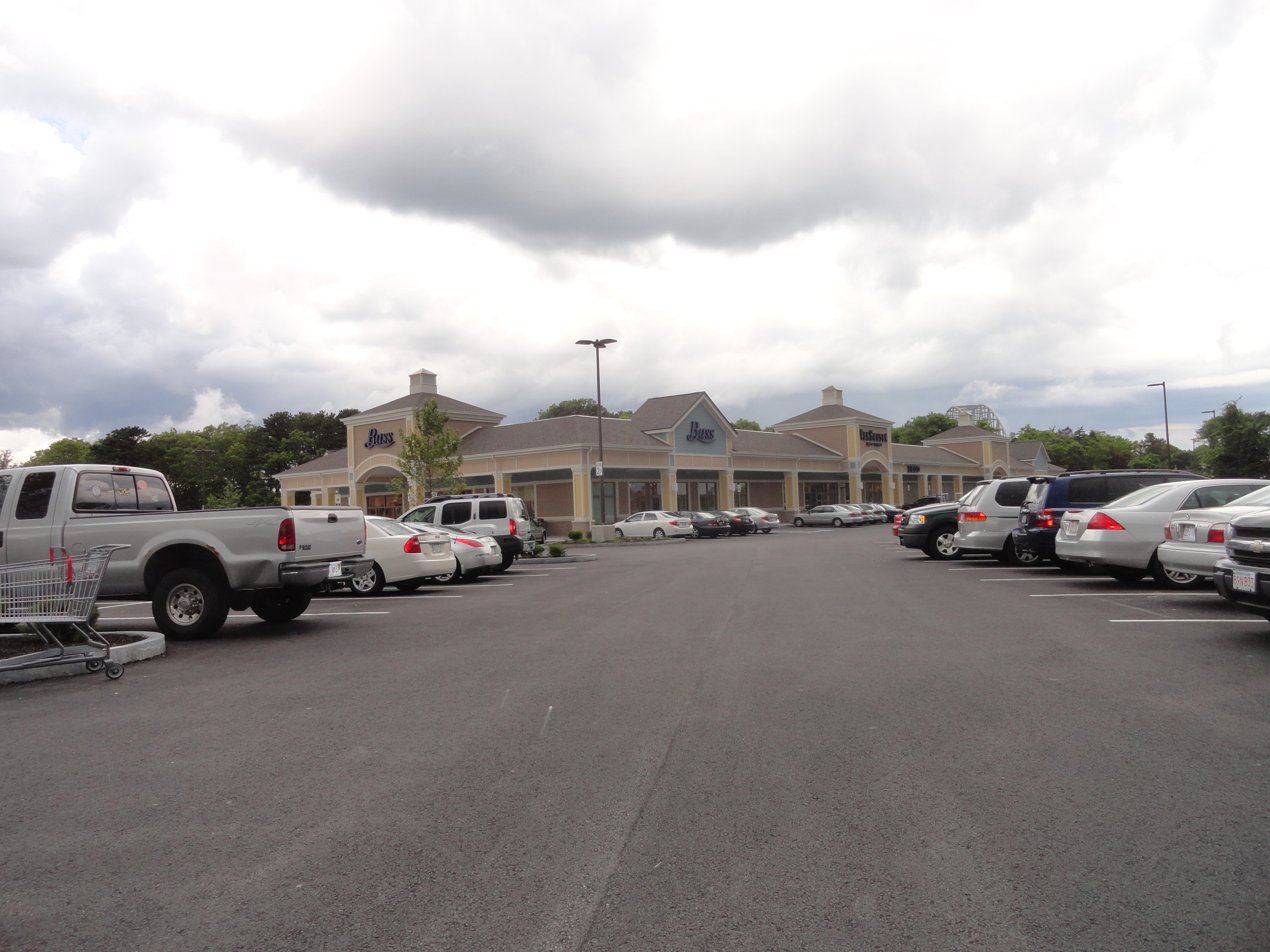
- The new mall building in 2012
- Location: Sagamore, Massachusetts
- Coordinates: 41°46′18.40″N 70°32′43.76″W
- Opened: 1972 (original, indoor mall); Summer 2012 (outdoor mall)
- Closed: July 4, 2011 (indoor mall)
- Owner: Compass Bourne LLC.
- Num. of stores: 8
- Num. of anchor tenants: 1
- Floors: 1

The Cape Cod Factory Outlet Mall was an outdoor mall located in Bourne, Massachusetts. It was first developed into a shopping center in 1972 as an indoor outlet mall, but by 2012 was developed into an outdoor plaza. When it was an indoor mall, it boasted approximately 25 shops, from outlets to local brands. The mall's grounds also once housed the original location of the Coca-Cola Bottling Company of Cape Cod, as well as a former motel.

The indoor mall was originally opened in 1972, with the original part being the area that housed the Carter's Childrenswear and Dress Barn. The mall then saw a major expansion in the late 1980s, when the main portion of the mall was added. In its heyday, it housed retailers such as Big Dog Sportswear, Osh Kosh B'Gosh, Buck-A-Book, and a Sbarro pizzeria.

The mall mostly thrived throughout the 1990s, with its apparent decline starting in the early 2000s, after Wrentham Village Premium Outlets opened nearby, siphoning much of their business. Buck-A-Book closed their store in the Cape Cod Factory Outlet Mall when the local chain went out of business in September 2005, which left one of the mall's largest tenant spaces vacant for the remainder of the mall's operation. The mall then continued to steadily lose tenants and fall into a state of disrepair for its remaining years. By 2009, the mall was well under 50% occupation. For these reasons, the mall came to be regarded as a dead mall.

The mall closed on July 4, 2011, after a decade of decreasing traffic and tenants, and before being razed. On September 12 of that year, it was announced that five stores (including Van Heusen, Izod, and Bass Outlet, but excluding Carter's) would return to the site, which was being rebuilt as a strip center anchored by Market Basket. Market Basket opened its store in June 2012.
