= Double Cola Company =

Soft drink manufacturer

The Double Cola Company
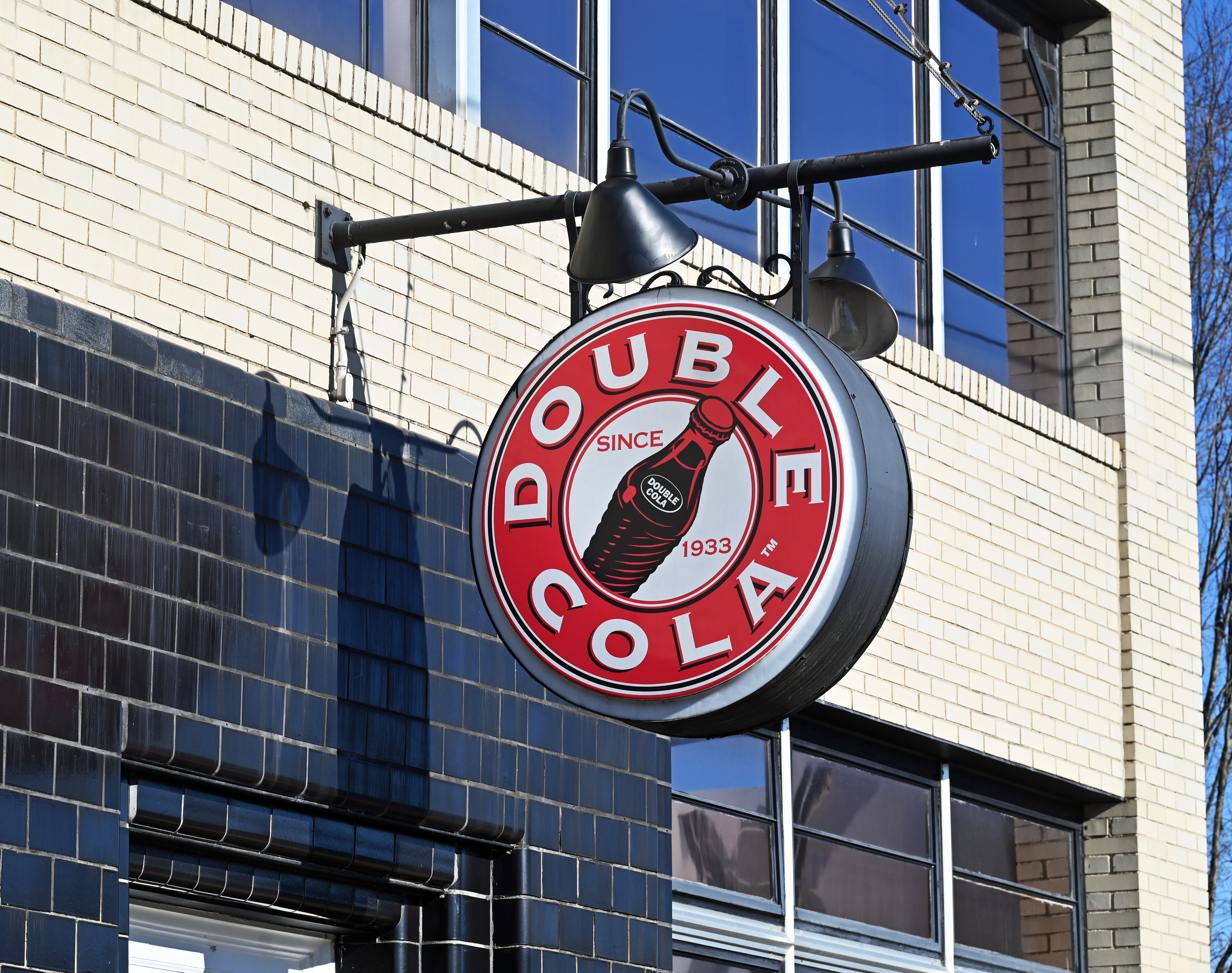
- Type: Private, wholly owned subsidiary
- Industry: Beverage
- Founded: 1922; 104 years ago
- Founder: Charles D. Little; Joe S. Foster
- Headquarters: Chattanooga, Tennessee, United States
- Products: Double-Cola; SKI; SKI InfraRED; JUMBO fruit flavors line CHASER; ORANTA; DOUBLE-DRY Ginger Ale; QUAD Energy; MINŌKU Coconut Water; ZILI Tea
- Number of employees: 20 (2003)
- Parent: K.J. International, Inc.
- Website: DoubleCola.com

Double Cola
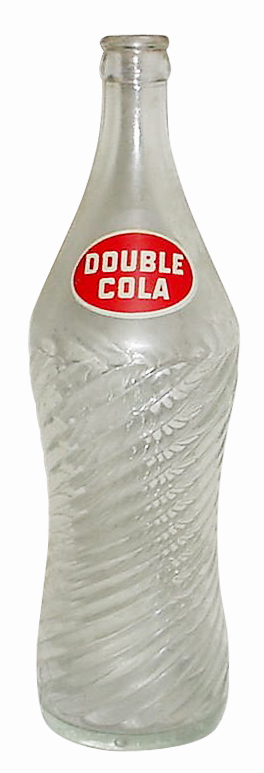
- Type: soft drink
- Manufacturer: Double Cola Company
- Origin: United States
- Introduced: 1933
- Variants: Ski, Jumbo Orange, Jumbo Grape
- Website: www.double-cola.com

The Double Cola Company is a manufacturer of soft drinks based in Chattanooga, Tennessee, United States.

Their primary product, Double-Cola, is predominantly distributed east of the Mississippi River in the US. It is also available in select international markets.

== History ==
The Good Grape Company was founded in 1922 by former Chero-Cola employees Charles D. Little and Joe S. Foster in Huntsville, Alabama, primarily to market the product Good Grape. The company moved to Chattanooga that same year. With Little's creation of Marvel Cola in 1924, Good Grape Company changed its name to Seminole Flavor Company. Marvel Cola was reformulated and renamed Jumbo Cola. The Double-Cola product was developed in 1933 and soon became the company's flagship product. The product was named Double-Cola because its 12-ounce (350 ml) bottles were twice the size of other soda bottles being sold at the time. It was soon followed by flavored Double-Orange, Double-Lemon, and Double-Grape and "Double-Dry" ginger ale.

During World War II's sugar rationing, Seminole continued bottling Double-Cola in the larger bottles, which hurt production. PepsiCo was in the same position, and Little had a chance to buy them and refused as he preferred just going forward with the cola Seminole had. Pepsi escaped bankruptcy and moved ahead of Seminole. In 1953 Seminole changed its name to The Double Cola Company as it is today though for a period known as the Double-Cola Co. USA.

In 1956, the company developed Ski, a soda pop comparable to Sun Drop. Ski is a citrus soda made with real orange and real lemon juice. The drink received its name when company asked employees to submit a name for their new product. Inspired by a weekend-long ski trip on Chickamauga Lake, then-employee Dot Myers submitted the names "Ski" and "Skee" into the contest. Management liked the name and it's been Ski ever since.

In 1957 Double-Cola made history by becoming the first major soft drink to be marketed in a 16-ounce (470 ml) returnable bottle. In 1962, the year Diet Double Cola was launched, Little sold the company to Fairmont Foods, which drained the company of resources. It was purchased in 1980 by K.J. International, Inc., from Canadian firm Pop Shops International, which acquired it from a consortium of private investors. It remains wholly privately held. Pop Shops had allowed the company to flounder as they focused on their existing brands.

In summer of 1960, Double Cola used a Chinese name as "(得寶可樂)", a locally made super king size with much more carbon dioxide for only 40 Hong Kong cents for a 16-ounce bottle which could serve three then-typical beverage cups.

== Since 2010 ==
In 2010 Diet Double-Cola was reformulated with Splenda to make it taste more like regular Double-Cola. Two years later the Double Cola was given new branding and packaging though the ingredients stayed exactly the same.

In 2013 The Double Cola Company expanded its product line outside of that of just soft drinks. Quad Energy, the company's first line of energy drinks, was released in 2012 in five different flavors; Berry Fusion, Lime Craze, Low Carb Kick, Orange Twist, and RE-Charge. The same year, The Double Cola Company released a coconut water product with MINŌKU Coconut Water. MINŌKU Coconut Water is sold under the claim of being ethically sourced in Thailand, and is sold nationally in the United States.

The Double Cola Company released ZILI Tea, a ready-to-drink tea brand, in 2013. The Double Cola Company website says, "ZILI Teas are all natural teas that harness the power of Mother Nature to hydrate, nourish, and satisfy."
