= Brænne Mineralvatn =

Norwegian drinks company

Brænne Mineralvatn was a small Norwegian bottling company established in 1915. They specialize in non-alcoholic drinks, chiefly carbonated soft drinks but also lemonade and mineral water. Brænne was among the last independent bottling companies in Norway. It shut down in 2010.

Their production facility was located between Ørsta and Volda, and their products where distributed mainly in the western part of Norway (Vestlandet). Brænne was the Norwegian manufacturer of R.C. Cola, a worldwide brand. They also cooperated with Lidl.

They had a large number of products, and their top sodas where:

- R.C. Cola
- Brus med pæresmak (green soda with pear taste)
- Brus med Annanassmak (orange soda with pineapple taste)
- Brus med sitronsmak (soda with a small taste of lemon)
- Saft type Rød (red juice type rød)
