= Coca-Cola Bottling Company of Cape Cod =

Coordinates: 41°43′30.18″N 70°29′18.33″W

Coca-Cola Bottling Company of Cape Cod, Inc.
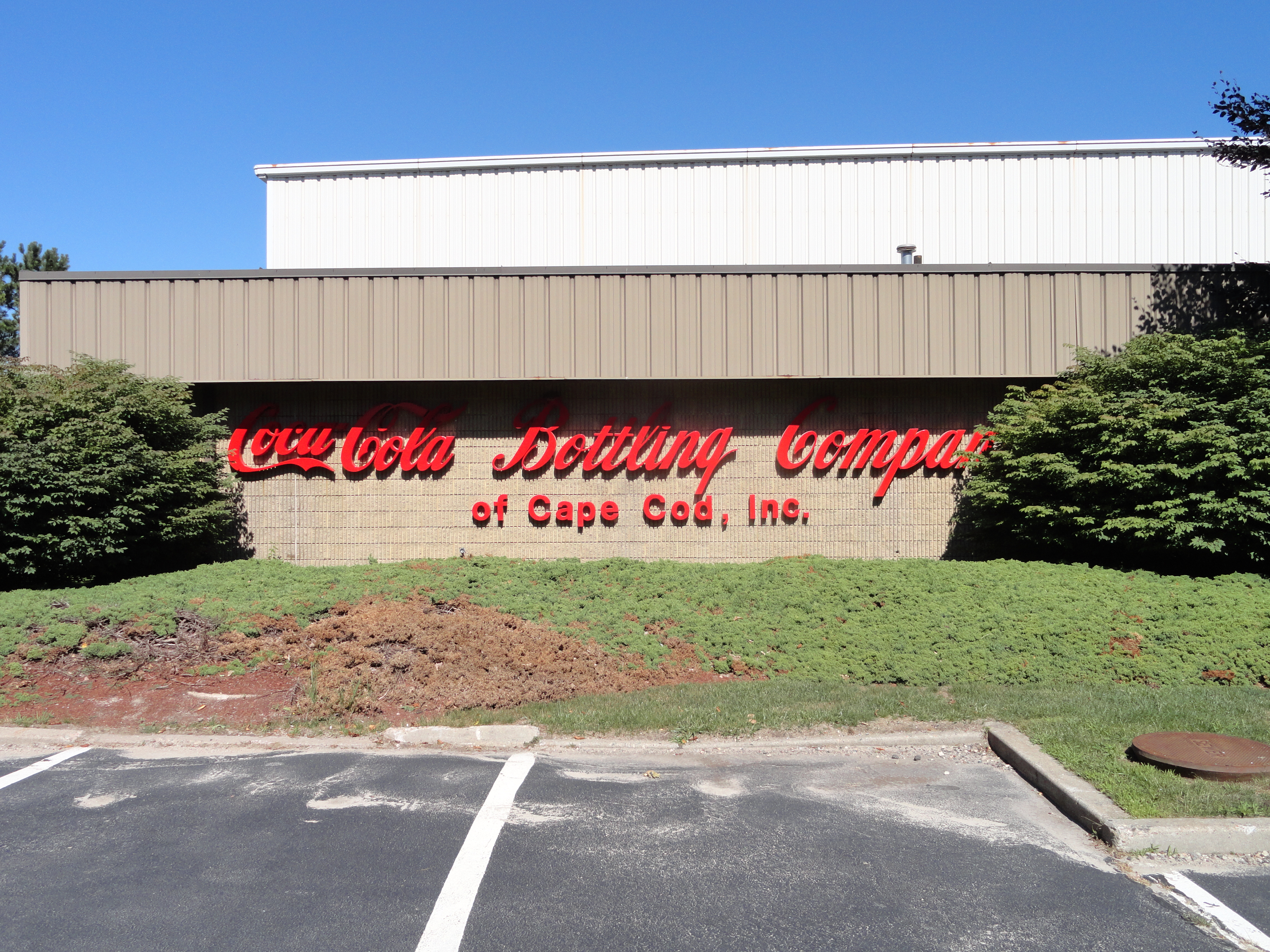
- Industry: Bottling, distribution
- Founded: 1939
- Defunct: February 2000
- Fate: Bought
- Headquarters: Sandwich, Massachusetts, United States
- Area served: Cape Cod, some towns in Southeast Massachusetts
- Number of employees: 85

The Coca-Cola Bottling Company of Cape Cod is a former bottler of Coca-Cola, Dr Pepper and Canada Dry soft drinks located in Sandwich, Massachusetts, United States. The company was bought out in 2000 by the Coca-Cola Bottling Company of Northern New England.

== History ==
The company was founded in 1939 by Musch Kayajan. He left the family's successful Nemasket Spring Water Company in Middleboro to open his own franchise of Coca-Cola in Sagamore, next to the former Cape Cod Factory Outlet Mall. In 1965, Musch died and his son John continued operating the business with his mother Amelia, who died in 1984. That same year, on May 16, a new 80,000-square-foot (7,400 m^{2}) plant operated at the present location.

Between 1989 and 1991, the company did not bottle due to issues with the treatment of wastewater at the site. In 1991, bottling resumed as an agreement was reached with an outside company to transport the water treat it off the site. The business continued bottling until 1997 when it no longer became economically viable to bottle at the plant. As a result, the company began to purchase soda and drinks from Coca-Cola Bottling Company of Northern New England. Today, it acts as a distribution warehouse and sales marketing center.

In 2008, the company hosted a trade show which helped to exhibit products that the company was selling.

== Community outreach ==
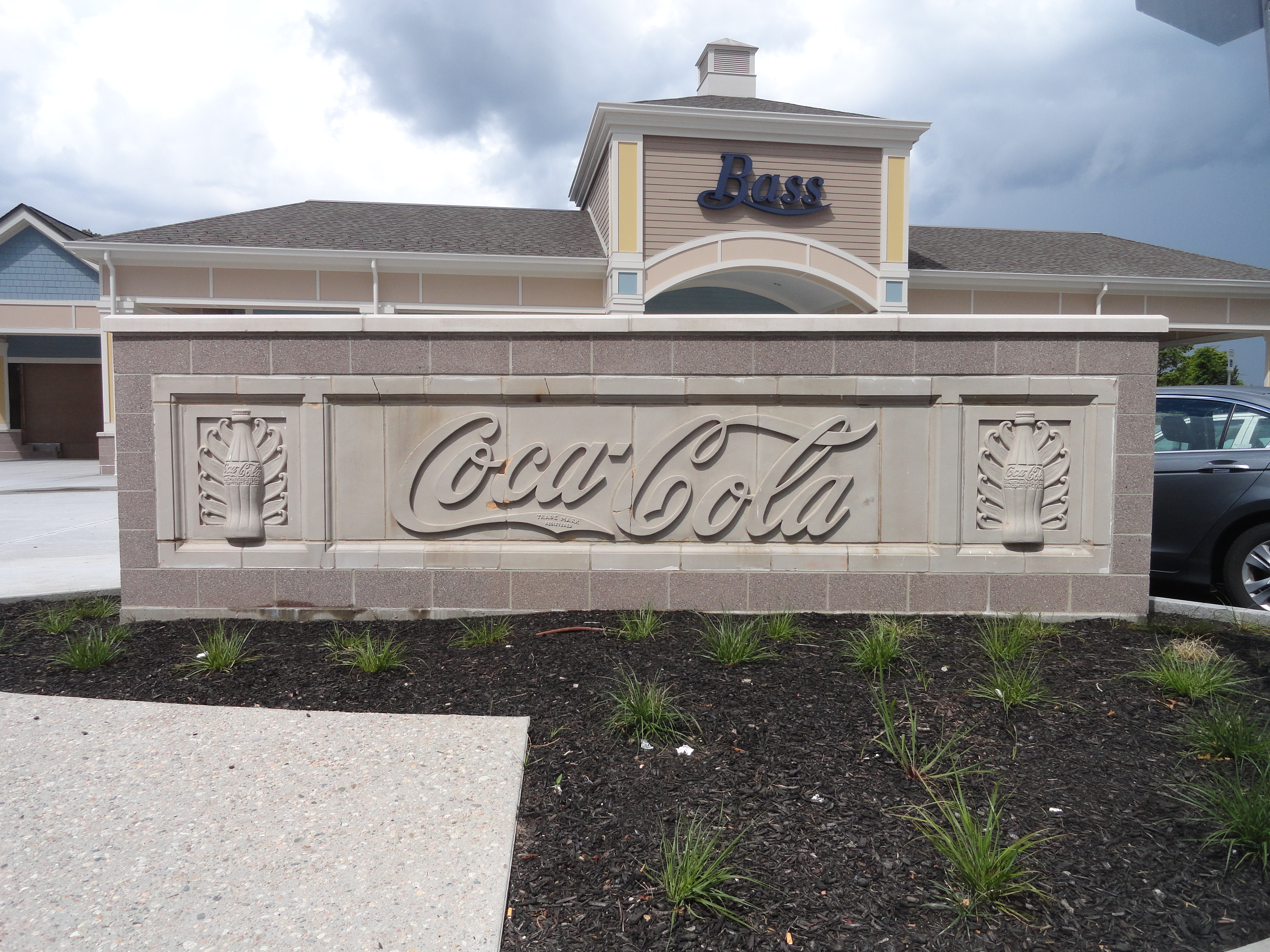
Building sign from the original factory location

Coca-Cola, in addition to being a long-time supporter of the Bourne Scallop Festival, is a supporter of the Cape Cod Baseball League. As recently as 2009, the company picked a pitcher and player each week as an outstanding person.

== Court cases ==
Over the years, the plant was involved in two court cases. The first was Cora M. Baker v. Coca-Cola Bottling Co. of Cape Cod & another, in 1977, when a woman sued the company over a traffic incident involving a company vehicle. In 1988, the company was sued by the state attorney general as part of a multi-company suit asking for seventy-three million dollars' worth of bottle deposits from the companies. The second case, Coca-Cola Bottling Co. of Cape Cod v. Weston & Sampson Engineers, Inc. occurred in 1998. That case involved the installation of treatment lagoons to help clean wastewater that the plant produced. This included old soda, bad batches, soapy and chlorinated water, and oil and grease from machinery. Additionally, the company was also ordered to pay 2.52 million dollars for a breach of a contract agreement with the Nantucket Natural water company. The company, based in Chatham, eventually went bankrupt due to the contract issue.
