= Coca-Cola Bottling Company United =

Private Coca-Cola bottling company

Coca-Cola Bottling Company United, Inc.
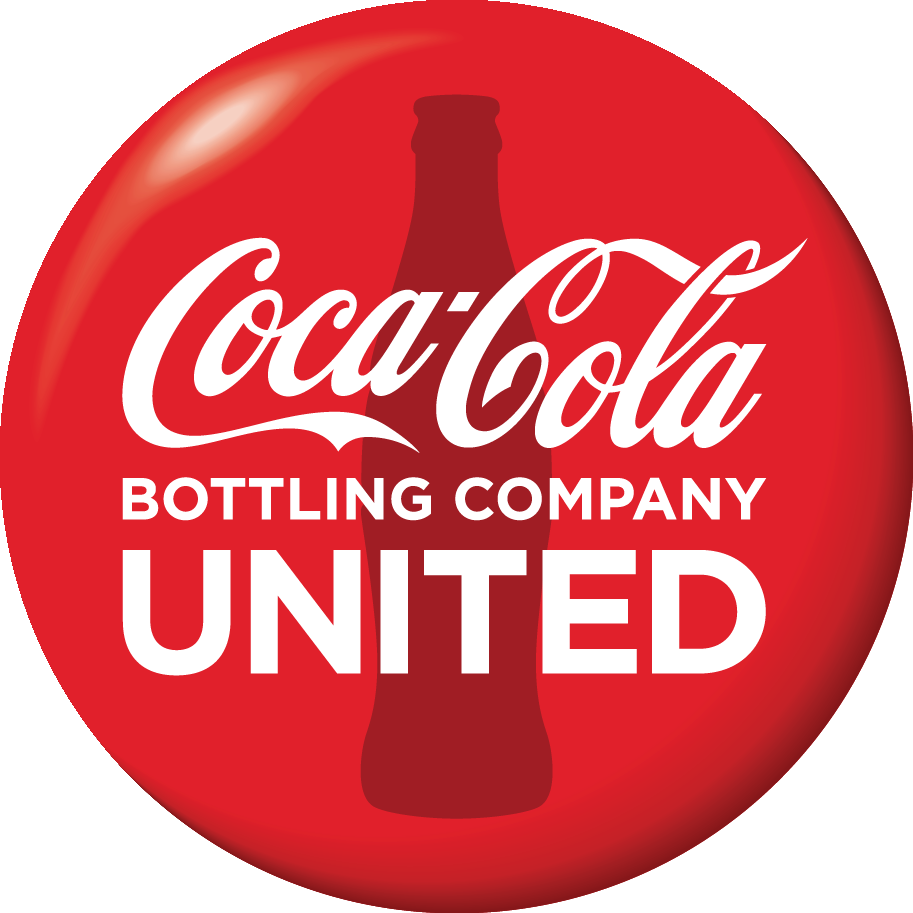
- Company type: Private
- Industry: Beverage bottling
- Founded: 1902
- Headquarters: Birmingham, Alabama, U.S.
- Key people: Mike Suco, chief executive officer Hafiz Chandiwala, chief financial officer
- Products: Coca-Cola products, Dr Pepper
- Revenue: ▲$4.20 billion USD (2024)
- Number of employees: ≈ 10,000 (2024)
- Website: cocacolaunited.com

Coca-Cola Bottling Company United, Inc. is a private Coca-Cola bottling company headquartered in Birmingham, Alabama. Coca-Cola United is the second-largest privately held Coca-Cola bottler in the United States and in which the Coca-Cola Company does not own an interest.

Coca-Cola United is a direct store delivery bottler. The finished product is delivered to customers within a geographic area. Therefore, they are considered the brand's local Coca-Cola bottler distributors.

== History ==
Coca-Cola Bottling Company United, Inc., founded in 1902 and headquartered in Birmingham, Alabama, is the third-largest bottler of Coca-Cola products in the United States and the largest privately held Coca-Cola bottler employing roughly 10,000 people. Coca-Cola United is principally engaged in the production, marketing, and distribution of over 750 non-alcoholic beverages, which include over 200 no or low-calorie options. Starting in 2013 United has acquired several territories across the SouthEast region, including the Savanna River Division and the Atlanta Division. The Atlanta Division covers The Coca-Cola Company's headquarter in Atlanta.

Among the brands are Coca-Cola, Coke Zero, Diet Coke, Sprite, Dr Pepper, Fanta, Dasani, Powerade, Minute Maid, vitaminwater and many more under exclusive franchise agreements with the Coca-Cola Company and other soft drink manufacturers.

On 28 May 2024, Coca-Cola Bottling Company United, Inc. announced a $330 million investment in a new facility in Birmingham's Kingston community. The development, set to create up to 50 new jobs and retain over 750 positions, will feature a 150,000-square-foot office complex and a 300,000-square-foot warehouse, and will serve as a major operational hub for the company.
