= Monarch Beverage, Inc. =

Indiana based beer and wine company

Monarch Beverage Company
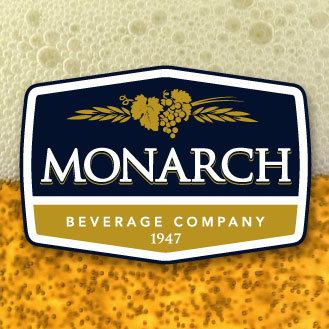
- Industry: Beverage
- Founded: 1947
- Founder: Edwin T. French Sr.
- Headquarters: Indianapolis, Indiana, U.S.
- Area served: Indiana
- Key people: Phil Terry (CEO) & John Xenos (General Manager)
- Products: Beer and Wine
- Website: http://www.monarch-beverage.com

Founded in 1947, Monarch Beverage Company is Indiana's largest distributor of beer and wine. The Indianapolis-based company represents more than 500 brands and employs over 600 Hoosiers.

== History ==
In 1947, Edwin T. French Sr. founded Monarch Beverage Company in Indianapolis, IN. The company originated with six employees and distributed only one brand of beer, Carling Black Label, from a warehouse the size of a medium home. In 1971, the distribution of wine began with E & J Gallo brands, followed by the distribution of Miller Brewing Company products in 1989 and the Coors Brewing Company brands in 1991.

Since the founding of Monarch Beverage, the company has grown substantially, acquiring 26 smaller distributors since 1975 and now servicing the entire state of Indiana with a variety of beverage products.
