= Coca-Cola Consolidated =

American beverage bottler

Coca-Cola Consolidated, Inc.
- Formerly: Coca-Cola Bottling Co. Consolidated
- Type: Public
- Traded as: Nasdaq: COKE; S&P 400 component
- Industry: Food processing
- Founded: February 19, 1906; 120 years ago, in North Carolina, U.S.
- Founder: J.B. Harrison
- Headquarters: Charlotte, North Carolina, U.S.
- Area served: U.S.
- Key people: J. Frank Harrison, III (chairman & CEO)
- Products: Beverages
- Brands: Coca-Cola; Diet Coke; Sprite; Dr Pepper; Monster
- Revenue: ▲US$7.23 billion (2025)
- Net income: ▼US$571 million (2025)
- Number of employees: 17,000 (2024)
- Website: www.cokeconsolidated.com

Coca-Cola Consolidated, Inc., headquartered in Charlotte, North Carolina, is the largest independent Coca-Cola bottler in the United States.

The company makes, sells and distributes Coca-Cola products along with other beverages, distributing to a market of 65 million people in 14 states. Coca-Cola Consolidated is based in the southeast, midwest, and mid-atlantic portion of the United States. The Company has 13 manufacturing facilities, 80 distribution and warehouses, with corporate offices located in Charlotte, North Carolina.

== Corporate history ==
In 1902, the company that later became Coca-Cola Bottling Company Consolidated was founded by the current chairman's great-grandfather, J. B. Harrison. That company was merged with other bottlers to form Coca-Cola Bottling Co. Consolidated in 1973. The company was incorporated in 1980, acquired Wometco in 1985, and acquired Sunbelt Coca-Cola in 1991.

The company describes its purpose as "to honor God in all we do, to serve others, to pursue excellence, and to grow profitably."

== Financials ==
On November 5, 2025 it was announced that Coca-Cola Consolidated had repurchased all outstanding stock held by The Coca-Cola Company. The transaction was funded with a 364-day, $1.2 billion loan from Wells Fargo. The Coca-Cola Company also relinquished its seat on the Coca-Cola Consolidated Board of Directors.

=== Tax Incentives ===
In June 2018, Kentucky governor Matt Bevin announced tax incentives of $3.5 million for Consolidated to expand in Erlanger. The incentives were part of a deal for Consolidated expansion in the area.

== Worker strike ==
The company, some of locales of which are unionized by the Teamsters, has seen strike initiatives.

== Community involvement ==
Coca-Cola Consolidated sponsors local events and many community organizations, including the YMCA. Since 2008, Coca-Cola Consolidated has partnered with the World Wildlife Fund (WWF) to promote sustainable water policies, including water reuse practices, to protect and restore aquatic diversity. Following the October 2015 North American storm complex Consolidated donated bottled water to flood victims. It also supports public school teachers in Arkansas.
