= Bottling company =

Beverage processing enterprise

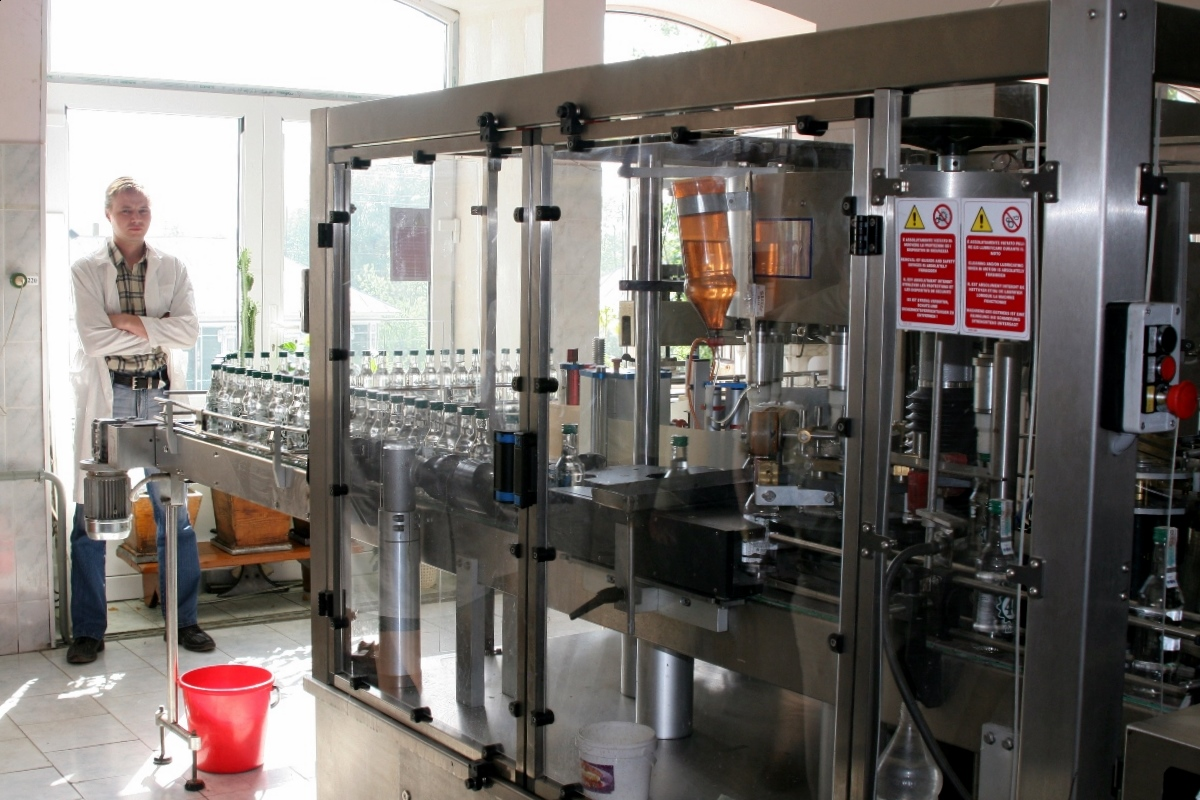
Vodka bottling machine, Shatskaya Vodka Shatsk, Russia

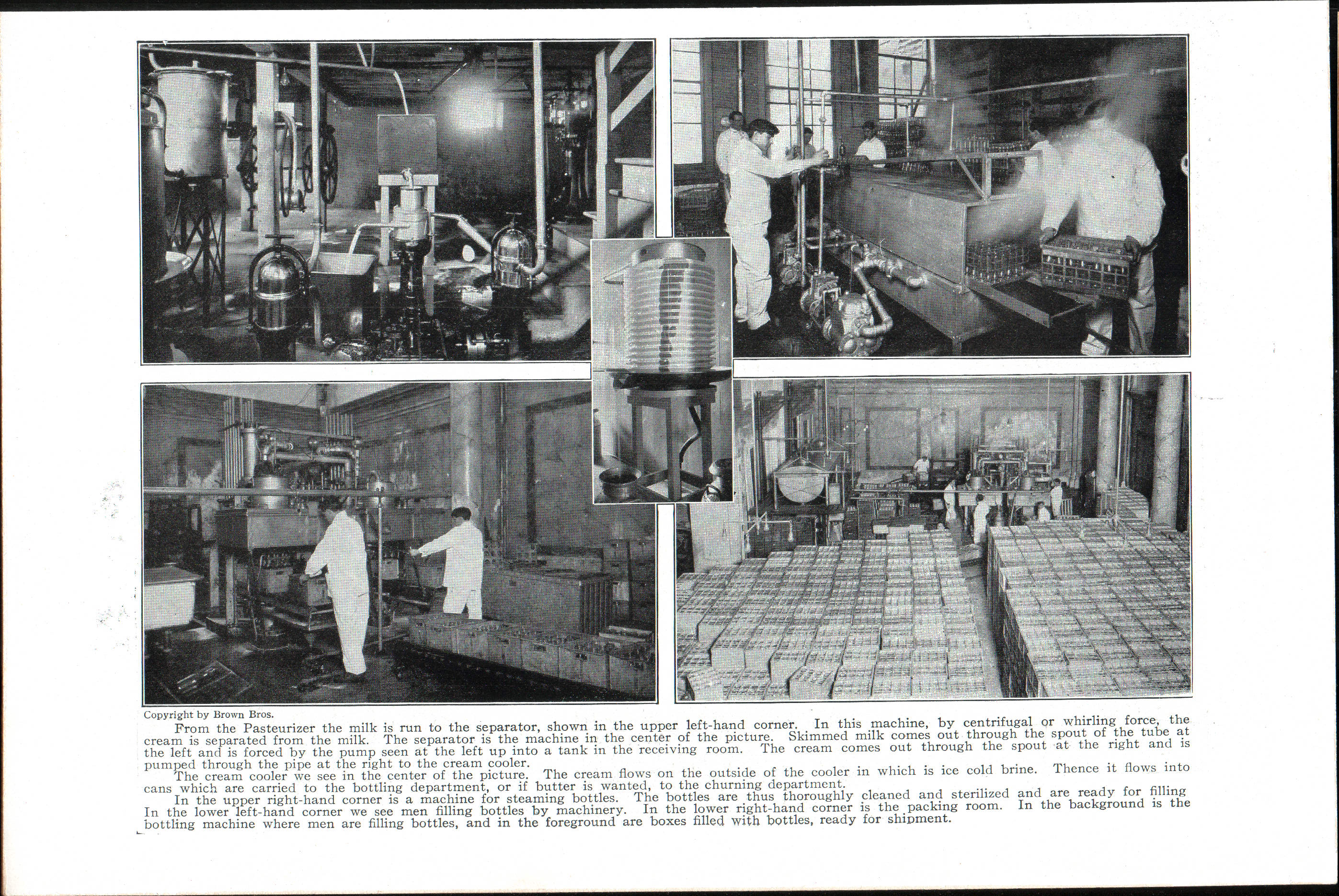
Milk separating and bottling

A bottling company is a commercial enterprise whose output is the bottling of beverages for distribution.

Many bottling companies are franchisees of corporations such as Coca-Cola and PepsiCo who distribute the beverage in a specific geographic region. Some bottling companies may also bottle other local beverages such as regional beers or wines.

A bottler is a company which mixes drink ingredients and fills up cans and bottles with the drink. The bottler then distributes the final product to the wholesale sellers in a geographic area. Large companies like The Coca-Cola Company sell their product to bottlers like the Coca-Cola Bottling Co. Consolidated, who then bottle and distribute it.

Usually, a type of ionizing radiation called gamma radiation is used to check whether the bottles are full at the bottling plant. This can be done by placing a gamma radiation source on one side of the bottle and a detector on the other side. The gamma radiation will penetrate through the material and the filled liquid, and the detector will record the amount of radiation that comes through. If the bottle is empty, more radiation will be registered than if the bottle is full, because the liquid will absorb some of the radiation.

== See also ==
- List of bottling companies
- Bottling line
