= Tennessee River Blueway =

Section of the Tennessee River

Coordinates: 35.05706°N 85.41523°W

The Tennessee River Blueway is a 50-mile (80 km) section of the Tennessee River that flows between the Chickamauga Dam and the Nickajack Dam and through downtown Chattanooga, Tennessee and the Tennessee River Gorge. The City of Chattanooga, the Tennessee River Gorge Trust, and other agencies have designated the section of river as a blueway for canoe and kayak paddler. The Blueway has camping areas next to the river, as well as museums, restaurants, activities, entertainment, and natural attractions. From there, the Blueway meanders its way to quieter places like Williams Island State Archaeological Park. Williams Island divides the river channel with a 450-acre (1.8 km^{2}) tract of land inhabited only by wildlife. From about 1000 to 1650, this area was home to several Native American tribes. It is now managed by the Tennessee River Gorge Trust. Then next of course is the 26-mile (42 km) stretch of the Tennessee River Gorge, a steep canyon formed by the Tennessee River. The land provides habitats for more than a thousand varieties of plants, ferns, trees, grasses and flowers as well as a wildlife population. Many of these are rare or endangered species such as the mountain skullcap. Dozens of archaeological sites bear evidence of man's presence in the Gorge for at least 10,000 years. There is a secluded spot where you can see Nickajack Cave from the water. Tennessee Valley Authority biologists monitor its bat population and encourage the public to "bat watch." There is no cave access, but canoeists and kayakers can observe the bats from the river.

== Map of the Tennessee River Blueway ==
View a Google Map

== Gallery ==
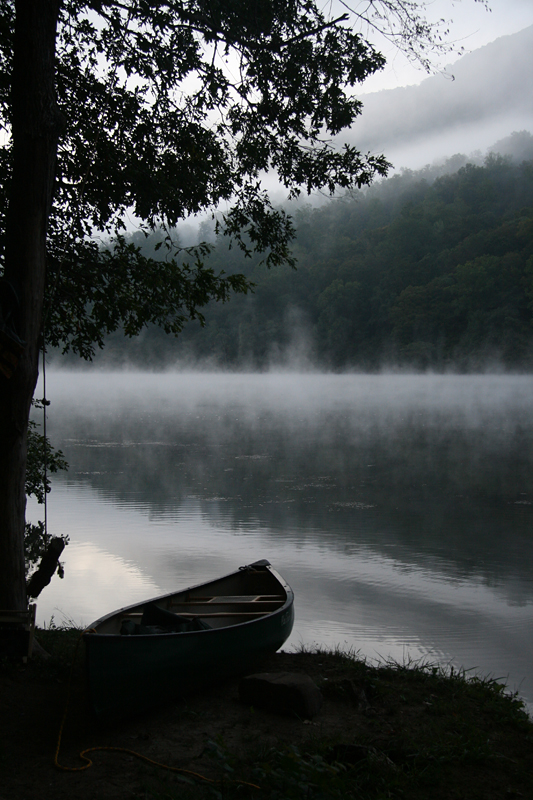
Early morning

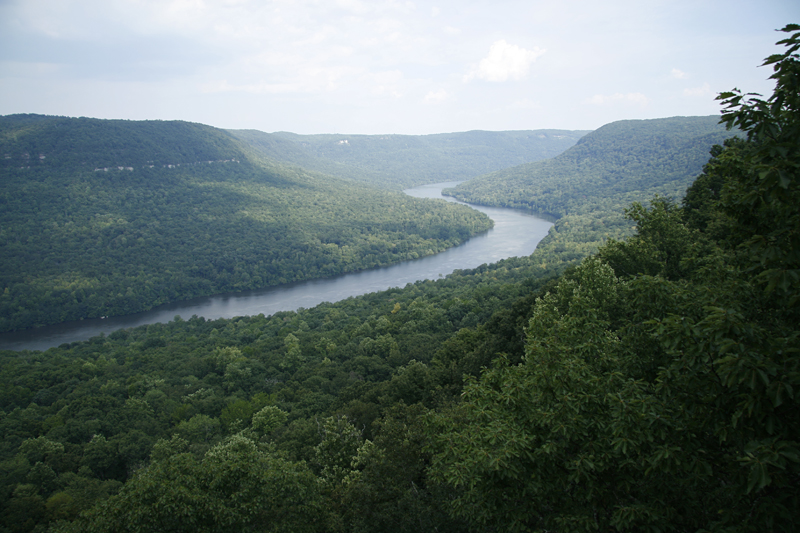
Tennessee River Blueway

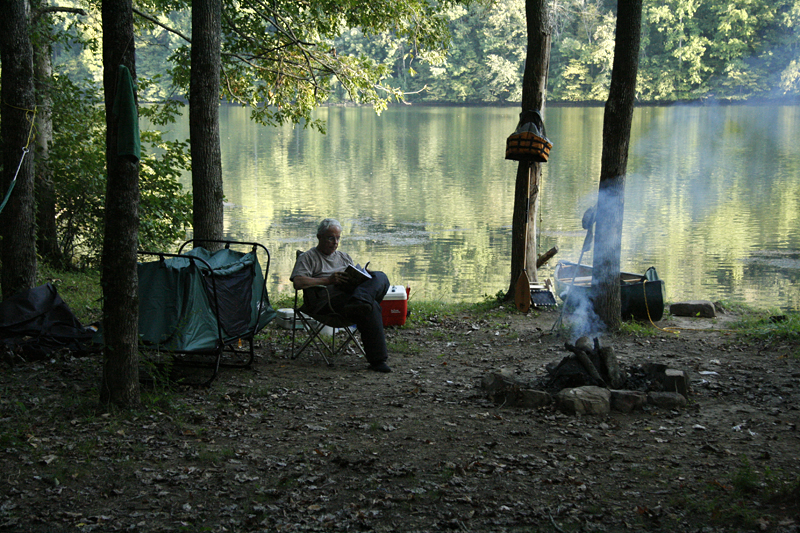
Camp on the Blueway

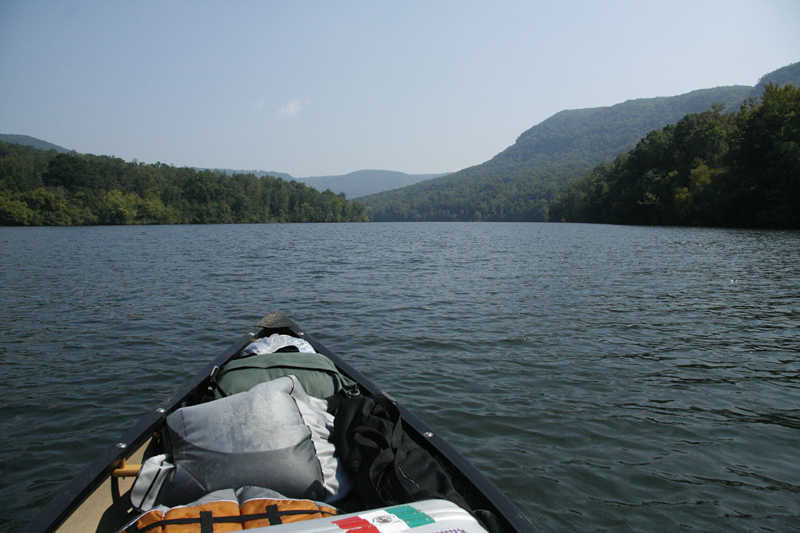
On the Blueway

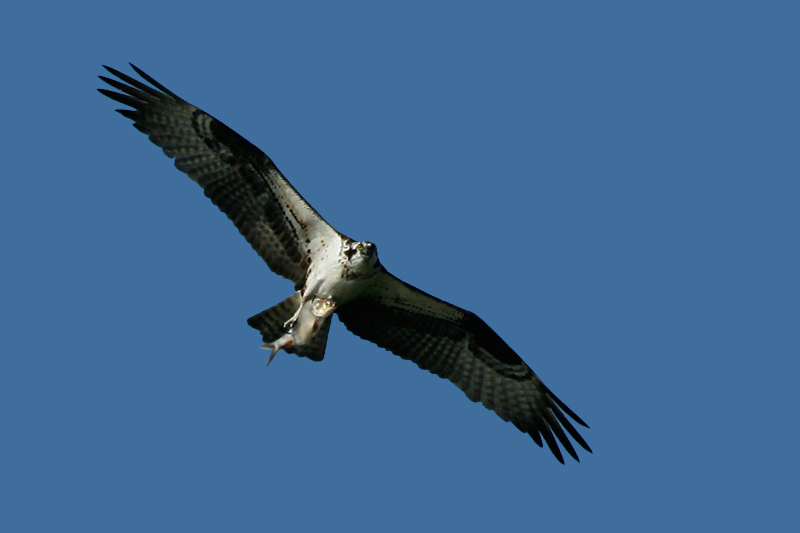
Osprey

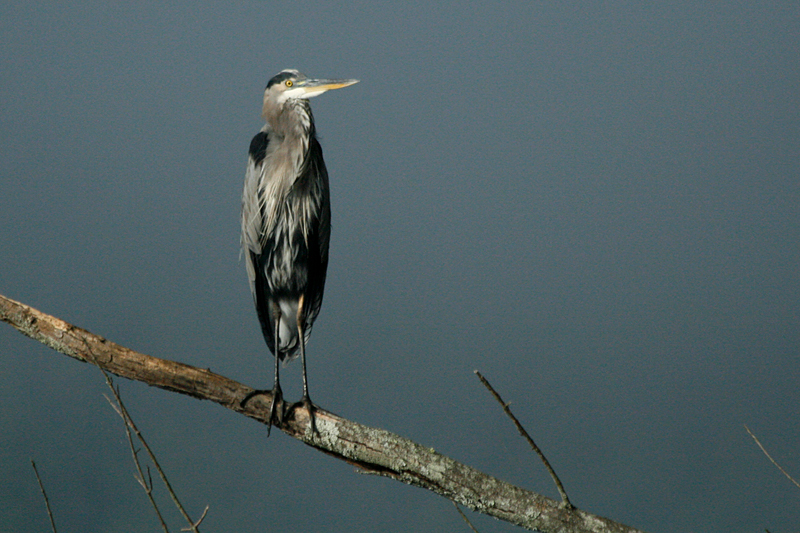
Great blue heron

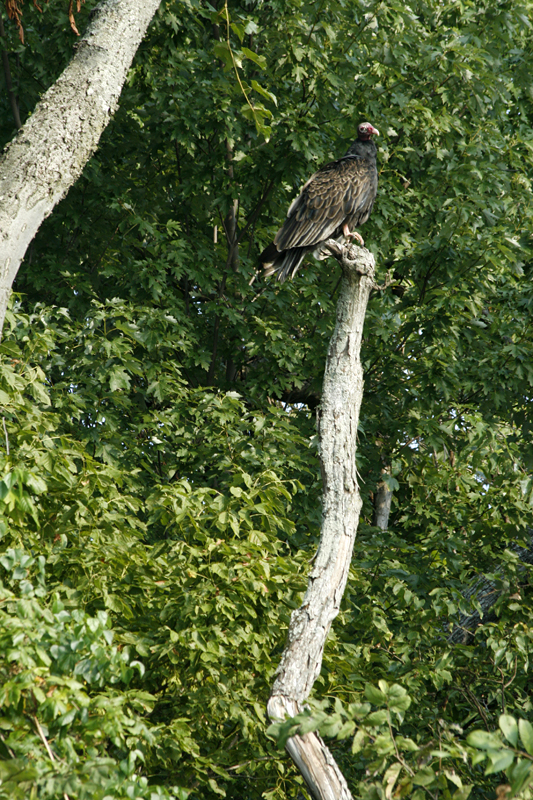
Turkey vulture

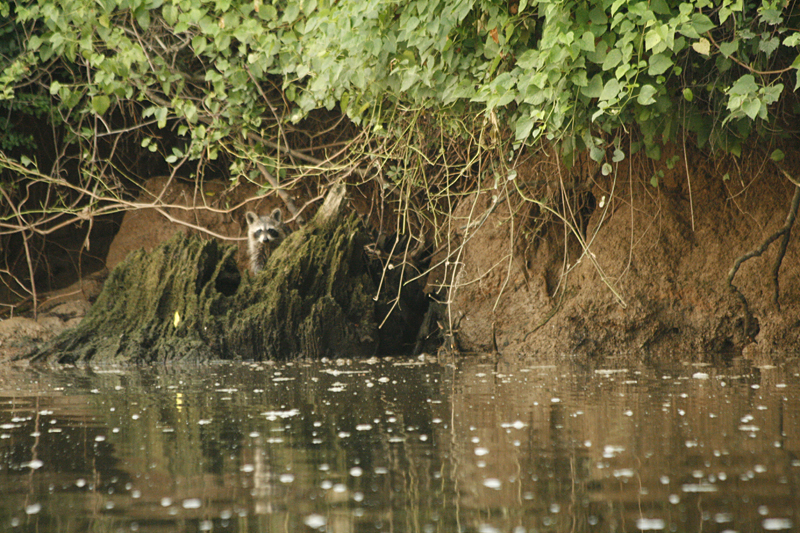
Raccoon
