= Marty Lowe =

American football player (1971–2026)

Profile
- Position: Quarterback

Personal information
- Born: September 21, 1971; Vicksburg, Mississippi, U.S.
- Died: September 7, 2026 (aged 54); Jeffersontown, Kentucky, U.S.
- Listed height: 6 ft 1 in (1.85 m)
- Listed weight: 210 lb (95 kg)

Career information
- High school: Red Bank (Red Bank, Tennessee)
- College: Louisville (1991–1995)
- NFL draft: 1996: undrafted

Career history

Playing
- St. Louis Stampede (1996); Texas Terror (1997)

Coaching
- Louisville (1997–1999) Assistant; Nashville Kats (2000–2001) Offensive assistant and offensive coordinator; UTEP Miners (2001) Running backs coach; Georgia Force (2002–2004) Head coach; Western Carolina (2005–2006) Offensive coordinator and quarterbacks; Louisville Fire (2007) Director of football operations
- Stats at ArenaFan.com

Marty Lowe (September 21, 1971 – September 7, 2026) was an American professional football quarterback and coach in the Arena Football League (AFL). He played college football at Louisville, and professionally for the St. Louis Stampede and Texas Terror of the AFL. Lowe was also the head coach of the AFL's Georgia Force.

== Early life ==
Lowe played high school football at Red Bank High School in Red Bank, Tennessee. He was named Mr. Football in Tennessee his senior year in 1990.

== College career ==
Lowe was a member of the Louisville Cardinals football team from 1991 to 1995. He threw for 253 yards and five interceptions his freshman year in 1991. He did not play in 1992. In 1993, he passed for 249 yards, two touchdowns, and two interceptions. He completed 186 of 319 passes (58.3%) for 2,091 yards, nine touchdowns, and 17 interceptions during the 1994 season. The next year, Lowe completed 195 of 350 passing attempts (55.7%) for 2,268 yards, 16 touchdowns, and five interceptions. He started 22 consecutive games for the Cardinals. He earned a master's degree in education from Louisville in 1999.

== Professional career ==
After going undrafted in the 1996 NFL draft, Lowe played for the St. Louis Stampede of the Arena Football League (AFL) in 1996. He recorded one solo tackle and one kick return for 18 yards.

Lowe played for the AFL's Texas Terror in 1997. He started the Terror's first game of the season before leaving with a knee injury. He completed 13 of 19 passes for 188 yards, two touchdowns, and one interception in 1997.

== Coaching career ==
Lowe was an assistant coach for the Louisville Cardinals from 1997 to 1999.

He joined the Nashville Kats of the AFL in 2000 as an offensive assistant. He later became the team's offensive coordinator. He was also the running backs coach for the UTEP Miners in 2001.

Lowe took over as head coach of the Georgia Force of the AFL in May 2002 after Robert Lyles was fired. Lowe served as the team's head coach from 2002 to 2004, compiling an overall regular season record of 17–19. He was fired in April 2004 after a 4–7 start to the season. He was then a sideline reporter for Louisville radio broadcasts during the 2004 college football season.

In March 2005, Lowe was hired as the running backs coach for the Western Carolina Catamounts. He was promoted to passing game coordinator in August 2005. He also later served as the team's offensive coordinator and quarterbacks coach. Lowe left the team after two season for personal reasons.

He was named the director of football operations for the Louisville Fire of the af2 in June 2007.

=== Head coaching record ===
Team	Year	Regular season				Postseason			
Team	Year	Won	Lost	Win %	Finish	Won	Lost	Win %	Result
Georgia	2002	5	4	.556	4th in Southern Division	-	-	-	
Georgia	2003	8	8	.500	3rd in Southern Division	1	1	.500	Lost to San Jose SaberCats in quarterfinals
Georgia	2004	4	7	.364	(Fired)	-	-	-	
Total		17	19	.472		1	1	.500	

== Death ==
Lowe died from kidney cancer in Jeffersontown, Kentucky, on September 7, 2026, at the age of 54.
