= Stringer's Ridge =

Coordinates: 35.069°N 85.321°W

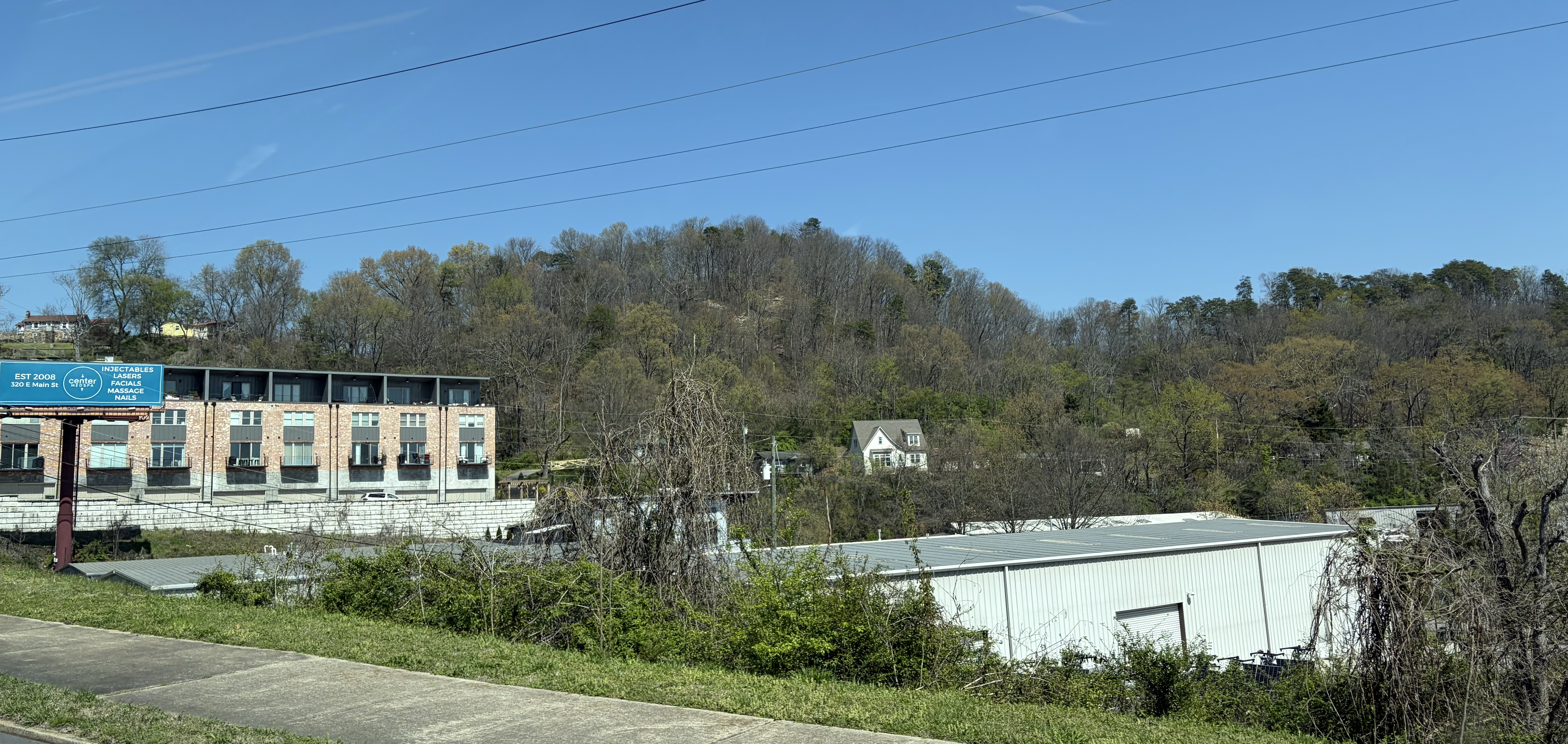
- Stringer's Ridge viewed from Dayton Boulevard
- Interactive map of Stringer's Ridge
- Type: Forested area with trails
- Location: Spears Avenue
- Nearest city: Chattanooga, Tennessee
- Operator: Tennessee River Gorge Trust
- Open: Year-round
- Designation: Preservation easement
- Website: trgt.org/stringers
- Stringer Ridge Historic District
- U.S. National Register of Historic Places
- U.S. Historic district
- NRHP reference No.: 84003557
- Added to NRHP: May 22, 1984

Stringer's Ridge Preservation Easement, generally known as Stringer's Ridge, is a 92 acre wilderness park located in North Chattanooga, Tennessee. The ridge overlooks the North Shore, the Tennessee River and downtown Chattanooga. The trail terrain consists of rolling hills and some short steep sections. Though the trail is well-groomed, it does have some tree roots along this single-track trail. Mature oak and hickory trees dominate the ridge. The Tennessee River Gorge Trust, the City of Chattanooga and The Trust for Public Land are involved in preserving and maintaining the area.

== History ==
Three hills make up Stringer's Ridge, a view so strategic that it was the site of the first Union invasion of Chattanooga. On June 7, 1862, Brigadier General James S. Negley's forces bombed Chattanooga from this ridge. The Confederate forces had control of the city until General John T. Wilder's Union army took the ridge named for Captain William Stringer.

In the years 2007 and 2008, 500 condominiums were planned on Stringer's Ridge. To block the development, The Trust for Public Land campaigned to purchase 37 acres on Stringer's Ridge. The landowner of the 37 acres also agreed to donate an additional 55 acres of adjacent property to the conservation effort. In 2009, the Tennessee River Gorge Trust became the conservation easement holder on the entire 92 acres.

The City of Chattanooga directly received ownership of the original 37 acres on Stringer's Ridge. Since 2011, the ownership of the remaining 55 acres has been transferred to the City of Chattanooga. However, the Tennessee River Gorge Trust continues to hold a conservation easement on all 92 acres.

== Design ==
Stringer's Ridge contains three trail loops totaling 10 miles, ranging from easy difficulty to strenuous. Most of the trails are family oriented allowing for leisurely stroll, while some of the trail is designated for more experienced hikers. A picnic area is located on the south side of the park. The park has two trail heads. One is on the south end on Old Bell Avenue, while the other is on the north end located on Spears Avenue. An outlook structure has recently been added to the park.
