= Red Bank, Tennessee =

- City
- Flag Seal

- Location of Red Bank in Hamilton County, Tennessee
- Coordinates: 35°6′37″N 85°17′49″W
- Country: United States
- State: Tennessee
- County: Hamilton County, Tennessee
- Incorporated: 1955

Government
  - Type: Council-Manager
  - Mayor: Stefanie Dalton
  - Vice Mayor: Hollie Berry

Area
  - Total: 6.56 sq mi (16.99 km^{2})
  - Land: 6.56 sq mi (16.99 km^{2})
  - Water: 0 sq mi (0.00 km^{2})
- Elevation: 722 ft (220 m)

Population (2020)
  - Total: 11,899
  - Density: 1,814.4/sq mi (700.54/km^{2})
- Time zone: UTC-5 (Eastern (EST))
  - Summer (DST): UTC-4 (EDT)
- ZIP code: 37415 (with some 37405 and 37434)
- Area code: 423
- FIPS code: 47-61960
- GNIS feature ID: 1299035
- Website: www.redbanktn.gov

Red Bank is a city in Hamilton County, Tennessee, United States. Its population was 11,899 at the 2020 census. Red Bank is an enclave, being entirely surrounded by the city limits of Chattanooga. Red Bank is part of the Chattanooga metropolitan area.

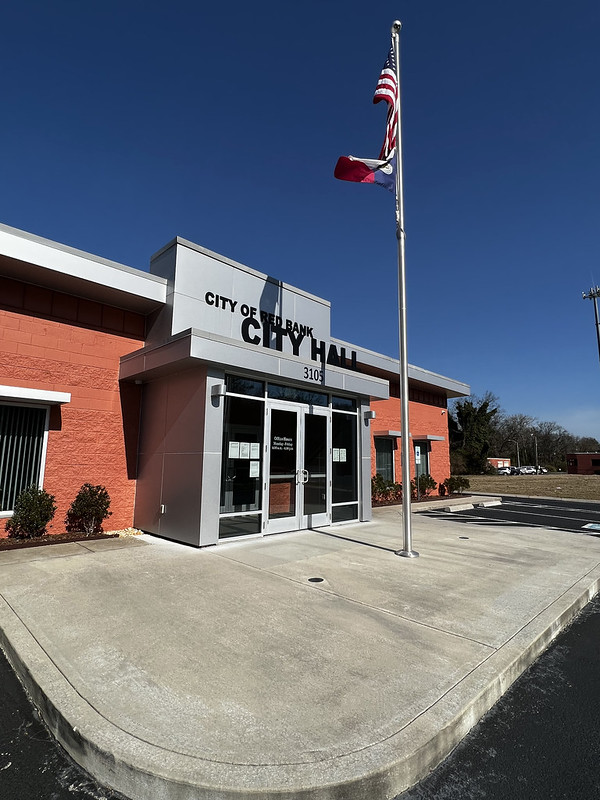
The new city hall in Red Bank was opened in 2019

== History ==
Red Bank was originally known as "Pleasant Hill" when a post office was established in 1881, but it was asked to adopt a new name, because the name "Pleasant Hill" was already taken. The name "Red Bank" was chosen by the wife of the first postmaster, George Hartman. It was inspired by the red clay ridge that was visible from a window in her house.

In 1955, the communities of Red Bank and White Oak incorporated as a single town called "Red Bank-White Oak". In 1966, the city voted to drop the "White Oak" for simplicity.

Stringer's Ridge, which runs north to south through much of Red Bank, was prominent as a lookout point and artillery position during the battles of Chattanooga during the American Civil War. On June 7, 1862, U.S. Brigadier General James S. Negley's forces bombed Chattanooga from this ridge north of the city. The Confederate forces had control of the city until General John T. Wilder's Union army took the ridge, which was named for Captain William Stringer.:

== Geography ==
Red Bank is located at 35°6′37″N 85°17′49″W (35.110372, -85.297048). The city lies at the base of the Cumberland Plateau in southwestern Hamilton County. It is bordered on all sides by the city of Chattanooga and is 5 miles (8 km) north of Chattanooga's downtown. Dayton Boulevard is the city's main thoroughfare, though U.S. Route 27 runs along the city's western edge.

According to the United States Census Bureau, Red Bank has a total area of 6.5 square miles (16.9 km^{2}), all land. The city center follows the valley of Stringers Branch, a southwest-flowing tributary of the Tennessee River.

== Parks and environment ==
Stringer's Ridge gives its name today to a 100-acre urban wilderness park, commonly known as Stringer's Ridge. Shared by Red Bank and the City of Chattanooga, the park includes a system of 10 miles of multi-use trails for biking and hiking. Citizen efforts stopped a condominium development on the ridge, leading to development of the park..

A new 12-acre Red Bank Central Park is being developed as of 2026, alongside Dayton Boulevard on the site of the former Red Bank Middle School, which previously for many decades was the Red Bank High School. The former school was demolished in 2013. Plans for a mixed-use commercial development of part of the park were stopped by citizen advocacy.

Stringer's Branch, a stream running through the community between Stringer's Ridge on the east and Godsey Ridge on the west, has been the site of pollution cleanup efforts. The Tennessee Department of Environment and Conservation (TDEC) had placed a "contact advisory" due to high levels of water contamination, including E. coli. The City of Red Bank has been working to clean up Stringer's Branch, with volunteer help and state funding, and TDEC monitoring indicates improvement.

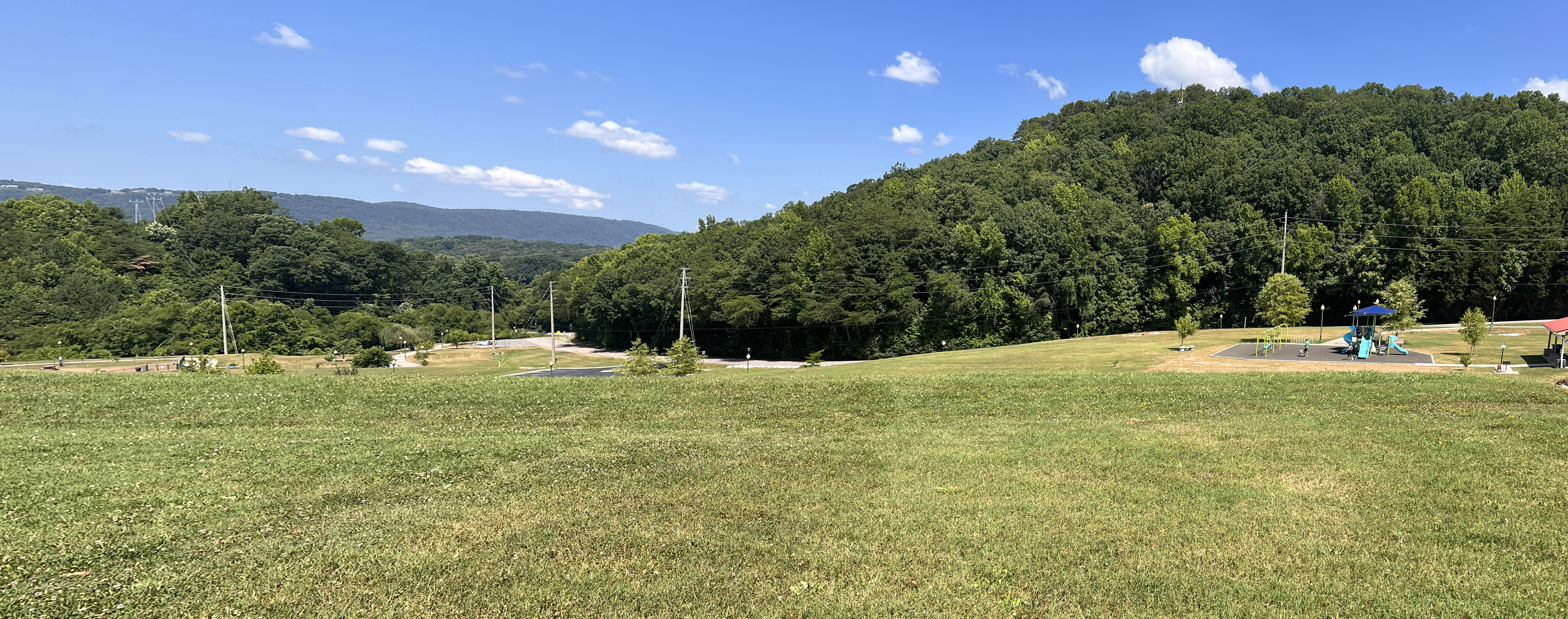
Looking North from White Oak Park

== Demographics ==
Historical population
Census	Pop.	Note	%±
1960	10,777		—
1970	12,715		18.0%
1980	13,129		3.3%
1990	12,322		−6.1%
2000	12,418		0.8%
2010	11,651		−6.2%
2020	11,899		2.1%
2025 (est.)	12,405	▲	4.3%

=== Racial and ethnic composition ===
Red Bank city, Tennessee – Racial and ethnic composition Note: the US Census treats Hispanic/Latino as an ethnic category. This table excludes Latinos from the racial categories and assigns them to a separate category. Hispanics/Latinos may be of any race.
Race / Ethnicity (NH = Non-Hispanic)	Pop 2000	Pop 2010	Pop 2020	% 2000	% 2010	% 2020
White alone (NH)	10,726	9,630	9,442	86.37%	82.65%	79.35%
Black or African American alone (NH)	1,017	854	789	8.19%	7.33%	6.63%
Native American or Alaska Native alone (NH)	56	37	18	0.45%	0.32%	0.15%
Asian alone (NH)	110	151	138	0.89%	1.30%	1.16%
Native Hawaiian or Pacific Islander alone (NH)	4	8	2	0.03%	0.07%	0.02%
Other race alone (NH)	3	10	42	0.02%	0.09%	0.35%
Mixed race or Multiracial (NH)	150	209	547	1.21%	1.79%	4.60%
Hispanic or Latino (any race)	352	752	921	2.83%	6.45%	7.74%
Total	12,418	11,651	11,899	100.00%	100.00%	100.00%

=== 2020 census ===
As of the 2020 census, Red Bank had a population of 11,899; the median age was 35.3 years. About 16.2% of residents were under 18, and 15.3% were 65 years of age or older. For every 100 females, there were 95.3 males, and for every 100 females 18 and over, there were 93.6 males.

Of the 5,786 households in Red Bank, 21.6% had children under 18 living in them, 33.5% were married-couple households, 24.4% were households with a male householder and no spouse or partner present, and 32.7% were households with a female householder and no spouse or partner present. About 37.6% of all households were made up of individuals, and 10.3% had someone living alone who was 65 or older.

Of the 6,344 housing units, 8.8% were vacant. The homeowner vacancy rate was 2.0% and the rental vacancy rate was 9.5%.

All of residents lived in urban areas, while none lived in rural areas.

Racial composition as of the 2020 census
Race	Number	Percent
White	9,660	81.2%
Black or African American	799	6.7%
American Indian and Alaska Native	43	0.4%
Asian	140	1.2%
Native Hawaiian and other Pacific Islander	7	0.1%
Some other race	451	3.8%
Two or more races	799	6.7%

=== 2000 census ===
As of the census of 2000, 12,418 people, 5,897 households, and 3,290 families resided in the city. The population density was 1,927.9 inhabitants per square mile (744.4/km^{2}). The 6,443 housing units had an average density of 1,000.3 per square mile (386.2/km^{2}). The racial makeup of the city was 87.61% White, 8.24% African American, 0.52% Native American, 0.89% Asian, 0.06% Pacific Islander, 1.19% from other races, and 1.51% from two or more races. Hispanics or Latinosof any race were 2.83% of the population.

Of the 5,897 households, 22.8% had children under 18 living with them, 39.2% were married couples living together, 12.6% had a female householder with no husband present, and 44.2% were not families. About 37.9% of all households were made up of individuals, and 11.8% had someone living alone who was 65 or older. The average household size was 2.10, and the average family size was 2.77.

In the city, the age distribution was 20.0% under 18, 11.3% from 18 to 24, 31.3% from 25 to 44, 22.0% from 45 to 64, and 15.4% who were 65 or older. The median age was 36 years. For every 100 females, there were 91.1 males. For every 100 females 18 and over, there were 87.3 males.

== Education ==
Within the Red Bank city limits are Red Bank High School, Red Bank Junior High, and Alpine Crest Elementary School. Red Bank Elementary School, while one of Red Bank's zoned schools, is outside of the city limits in Chattanooga.

== Health Care ==
Erlanger North Hospital, part of the Erlanger Health System, is located near the school campuses.

== Government ==
Red Bank has a council-manager form of government, with five elected commissioners. Commissioners serve staggered four-year terms, so the entire commission does not turn over all at once. The five commissioners vote on city matters in public meetings and direct the city manager, who carries out the daily affairs of the city. All subsequent city employees report to the city manager.

Additional citizen boards, the Board of Zoning Appeals and the Board of Floodplain Review, may assist in the zoning processes.

The City has also initiated the use of citizens' advisory boards to allow for public input into issues impacting the community. Current boards include: Cemetery Citizens' Advisory Board, Festival Citizens' Advisory Board, Public Art Citizens' Advisory Board, Urban Transportation Citizens' Advisory Board, Parks and Recreation Citizens' Advisory Board, Nonprofit Citizens' Advisory Board, and Transportation Safety Committee.

== Mayors ==
- 1955-1959 Burk S. "Tom" Millard
- 1959-1963 J.E. Brown
- 1963-1965 R. Hayden Landers
- 1965-1971 Joe H. Godsey
- 1971-1973 Joe Glasscock
- 1973-1975 Tom H. Collins
- 1975-1976 Brown Gorden
- 1976-1977 Ralph G. Barger
- 1977-1979 J.D. Carnes
- 1979-1981 Ralph G. Barger
- 1981-1983 Thomas R. Dodd
- 1983-1985 Ralph G. Barger
- 1985-1987 John Ramey
- 1987-1989 Ralph G. Barger
- 1989-1991 Ronnie E. Moore
- 1991-1993 Lester L. Barnette
- 1993-1995 Ernest E. Lewis
- 1995-1997 Ralph G. Barger
- 1997-1999 Pat Brown
- 1999-2001 Ronnie E. Moore
- 2001-2003 Jewel R. Coleman
- 2003-2004 Howard Cotter
- 2005-2006 Pat Brown
- 2006-2007 Howard Cotter
- 2007-2010 Joe Glasscock
- 2010-2012 Monty Millard
- 2012-2018 John M. Roberts
- 2018-2020 Eddie L. Pierce
- 2020 Ruth Jeno
- 2020-2024 Hollie Berry
- 2024-present Stefanie Dalton

== Politics ==
Red Bank city vote by party in presidential elections
Year	Democratic	Republican	Third parties
2020	49.85% 2,918	46.75% 2,736	3.40% 199
2016	36.98% 1,690	54.18% 2,476	8.84% 404
2012	39.04% 1,036	56.86% 1,509	4.10% 109
2008	39.40% 1,111	58.48% 1,649	2.12% 60

== Notable people ==
- Kane Brown, singer
- Emma Bell Miles, writer, poet, and artist
- Tim Benford, former NFL wide receiver
- Keionta Davis, NFL defensive end
- Bill Dedman, Pulitzer Prize-winning journalist and author
- Don McKenzie, American wildlife conservationist and naturalist
- Dorothy Montgomery, former professional baseball player in the All-American Girls Professional Baseball League
- Wendell Rawls, Jr., Pulitzer Prize-winning journalist and author
- Ronald L. Schlicher, diplomat and foreign service officer

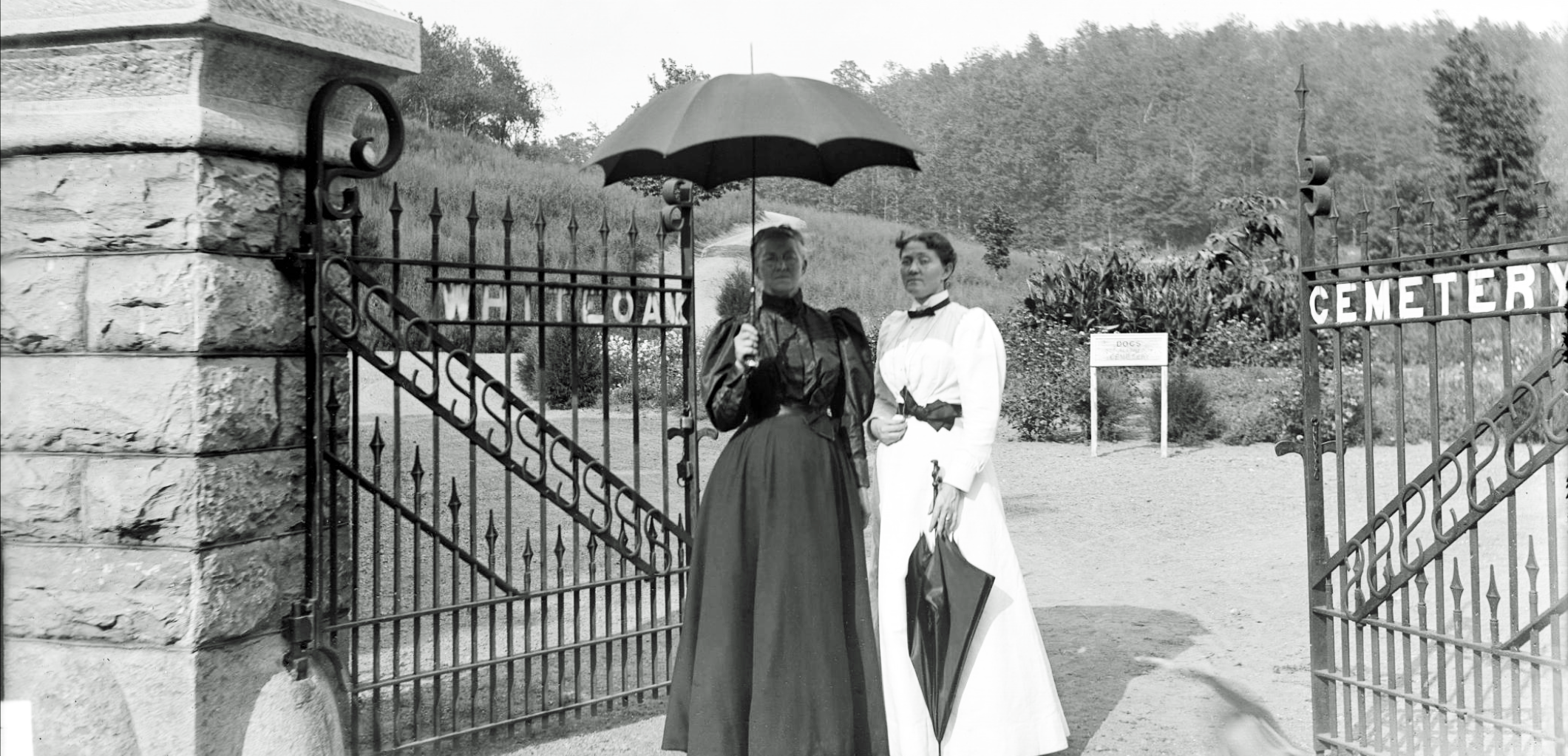
Two women at the cemetery entrance to White Oak Cemetery, circa 1895

== Cemeteries ==
- The Red Bank Cemetery is located off Morrison Springs Road; it is also known as the James Cemetery. It is managed by the city. The Red Bank Cemetery Advisory Board has spearheaded an extensive effort to restore the property.
- A paupers' cemetery now referred to as the Field has received attention from historians and volunteers in recent years. This burial site was for those who could not afford a proper burial and for deceased prisoners and others. Research is under way that could shape its future. It is located on the White Oak Connector Trail, but is overgrown.
- Chattanooga Memorial Park, also in Red Bank, is the largest in the city. It is privately owned and operated. Sometimes known by residents by its former name, White Oak Cemetery, it is often called "the duck pond" after its most prominent feature. Among those interred at this cemetery is Emma Bell Miles.
- B’nai Zion Cemetery, sometimes known colloquially as the Old Jewish Cemetery, is overseen by B'nai Zion Congregation.
