= Red Bank High School =

Coordinates: 35.1223°N 85.3057°W

Location
- 640 Morrison Springs Road; Red Bank, Tennessee 37415; United States

Information
- Type: Public
- Motto: “Every Voice, Every Dream, Every Day.”
- Established: 1938
- School district: Hamilton County Schools
- Principal: Chris Tillett
- Teaching staff: 50.52 (FTE)
- Grades: 9 – 12
- Enrollment: 819 (2023–2024)
- Student to teacher ratio: 16.21
- Campus size: 54 acres
- Colors: Blue and White
- Mascot: The Lion
- Team name: Red Bank Lions
- Newspaper: The Blue and White
- Yearbook: Roar
- Website: Official Website

Red Bank High School is a public school located in the city of Red Bank, Tennessee, United States.

== History ==
Red Bank High School (RBHS) began as an extension to the one-year-old Red Bank Junior High School in 1938. Recognizing that the original plans for the school serving grades 7, 8, and 9 were not fulfilling the needs of the Red Bank community and surrounding areas, the Hamilton County Board of Education added a 10th grade in 1938, an 11th grade in 1939, and finally a 12th grade in 1940.

During the three years of movement toward being a complete high school, RBHS created its unique identity in the area. Blue and white were chosen as the school’s colors, and Lions were selected as the mascot. A school newspaper was created called the Blue and White, while the yearbook was named the Roar. The school's colors of blue and white, with the addition of red from the name, creates the three colors comprising the American flag, which is why those two colors were chosen. The first senior class, consisting of 50 students, graduated in 1941.

Due to the booming population growth in the area of the school, the board of education built several additions to the original building. Additions in 1939, 1944, and 1955 not only opened up new classrooms, but also provided an auditorium, a band room, a music room, and athletic facilities. With the opening of a new Red Bank Junior High School in 1960, grades 7 – 9 were removed from Red Bank High School, opening up much more space for the increasing school population and for a much needed home economics department. During the 1970–71 school year, a new cafeteria, study hall, and gymnasium were added and the old cafeteria space was renovated for use by the JROTC department.

Recognizing that the limited acreage of the campus on Dayton Boulevard prohibited further growth, RBHS changed campuses with Red Bank Junior High School in the summer of 1982. The new campus on Morrison Springs Road offered 54 acres of space for new growth and development. Four new additions to the campus have provided valuable facilities. In 1982, a wing was built to house the JROTC department, and in 1983, a new football stadium was completed. Then in 1986, a wing was built to accommodate the move of the 9th grade back into the Red Bank High School student body, and in 1990, a wing was opened with a new gymnasium, cafeteria, conference room, and library, as well as offices and classrooms.

Student enrollment at RBHS fluctuates between 725 and 800. The school has won state championships in wrestling, football, volleyball, and softball.

RBHS offers various programs for the students, and was named a National Blue Ribbon School in 1993.

== Notable alumni ==
- Tim Benford (2008), former NFL wide receiver
- Kane Brown, country singer
- Keionta Davis (2012), NFL defensive end
- Brent Johnson, former NFL offensive lineman
- Marty Lowe, football player and coach
- Dorothy Montgomery, former professional baseball player in the All-American Girls Professional Baseball League
- Gerald Riggs Jr. (2002), former CFL running back
- Ronald L. Schlicher, diplomat and foreign service officer
