= Don McKenzie (conservationist) =

American conservationist and naturalist

Don McKenzie is an American wildlife conservationist and naturalist. He served as director of the National Bobwhite Conservation Initiative and later became involved in conservation advocacy in Red Bank, Tennessee, where he was associated with the Save Red Bank Central Park effort and discovered a Tennessee state champion Virginia pine.

== Conservation career ==
McKenzie worked in wildlife conservation for more than three decades. He was director of the National Bobwhite Conservation Initiative, a University of Tennessee-based effort focused on range-wide recovery of northern bobwhite habitat and populations. In 2019, the National Bobwhite & Grassland Initiative described him as a former NBCI director and stated that he had been involved with the initiative from its early development, including as a facilitator and editor of the original Northern Bobwhite Conservation Initiative and as a national leader for implementation beginning in 2004.

McKenzie was also a co-author of "Progress of the National Bobwhite Conservation Initiative", published in the National Quail Symposium Proceedings in 2017.

== Red Bank Central Park advocacy ==
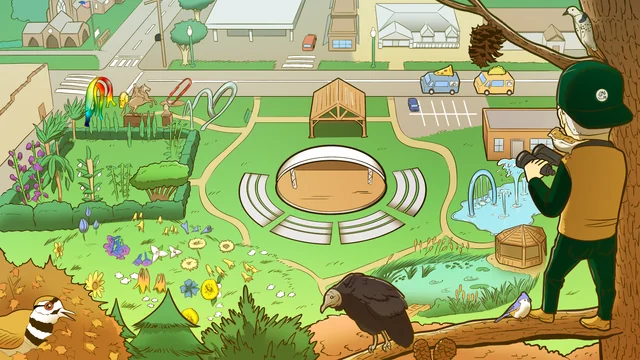
Concept artwork associated with the Save Red Bank Central Park effort

After retiring from national conservation work, McKenzie became active in Red Bank, Tennessee, conservation and public-space advocacy. He was associated with Save Red Bank Central Park, a citizens' effort advocating for the former Red Bank Middle School property to remain in public ownership and become a nature-based central park. In 2021, WTVC reported that McKenzie was behind Save Red Bank Central Park and had helped organize a petition and fundraising effort to preserve the site.

WUTC described McKenzie and Larry Miller as members of Save Red Bank Central Park and reported that the effort sought to turn roughly a dozen acres at the former Red Bank High and Middle School site into a nature-based park. WDEF later described McKenzie as the head of the group and reported that the organization continued to advocate for the property as a central public space.

== Tennessee state champion Virginia pine ==
While documenting plant and animal life on the former Red Bank Middle School property, McKenzie discovered an unusually large Virginia pine. The tree was later measured at 94 feet tall and 35 inches in diameter and was recognized by the Tennessee Champion Tree Program as the state champion Virginia pine. Red Bank Mayor Hollie Berry accepted the Tennessee Champion Tree Award at the Tennessee Urban Forestry Conference in November 2022, accompanied by McKenzie.

The tree was located near the southwest corner of the former school property, and McKenzie and others cleared a trail to make it accessible to visitors.

== Selected works ==
McKenzie, Donald F.; Morgan, John J.; Dailey, Thomas V. "Progress of the National Bobwhite Conservation Initiative." National Quail Symposium Proceedings, vol. 8, article 13, 2017.
