= Emma Bell Miles =

American poet

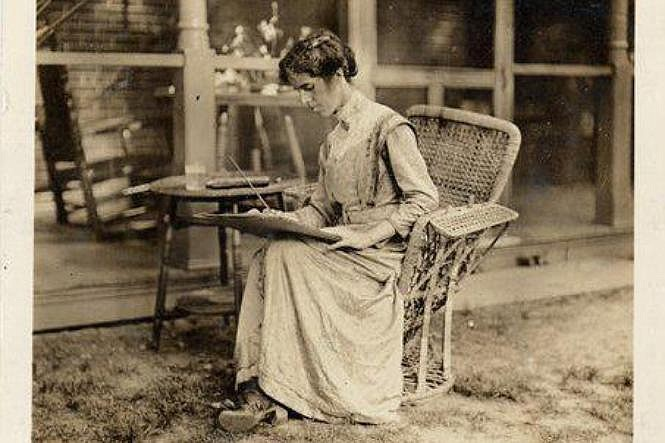
- Born: Emma Bell; October 19, 1879; Evansville, Indiana, US
- Died: January 25, 1919 (aged 39)
- Resting place: Red Bank, Tennessee, US
- Children: 4
- Writing career
- Notable work: The Spirit of the Mountains

Emma Bell Miles (October 19, 1879 – March 19, 1919) was a writer, poet, and artist. Her works capture the essence of the natural world and the culture of southern Appalachia.

== Early life and education ==
Emma Bell was born on October 19, 1879, in Evansville, Indiana. Her father, Benjamin Franklin Bell, and her mother, Martha Ann Mirick Bell, were both teachers. Emma's early childhood was spent in Rabbit Hash, Kentucky, a small town on the Ohio River near Cincinnati. When she was nine, her family moved to Red Bank, Tennessee, and then to Walden's Ridge (now Signal Mountain), Tennessee.

In the fall of 1899, Emma Bell accompanied her teacher, Zerelda Rains, to St. Louis where she entered the St. Louis School of Art. She returned to Walden's Ridge after only two years due to homesickness. There she fell in love with George Franklin Miles, also known as Frank. Bell married Frank on October 30, 1901, just three weeks after her mother's death. Her family opposed the marriage.

Emma and Frank had five children: twin daughters Jean and Judith (September 1902), son Joe Winchester (February 1905), Katharine "Kitty" (January 1907), and Mark (March 1909). In 1913, Mark died from scarlet fever.

== Personal life ==
Emma and Frank had a difficult marriage. Their family often suffered from poverty and hunger, and Emma was bitter about Frank's inability to find paying work to support the family. At one point she notes in her journal that her daughter, Jean, had run away and then she adds "I don't blame her." Emma and Frank separated a number of times, and during these times Emma lived in the Francis Willard Home for Women in Chattanooga to make money in town. She proved to be a darling of society and she often gave lectures which were highly regarded and well received. She also held the post of writer-in-residence at Lincoln Memorial University in Harrogate, Tennessee for one term. Yet no matter how much Emma enjoyed the intellectual life of the city, she always returned to her simple life on the mountain with her husband.

For two months in 1914, Emma worked for the Chattanooga News and took on the role for paying her family's bills. She spent many of her weekends in the country to get away from city life. She left the newspaper in June 1914 because she became pregnant. In response, she wrote in her journal, "All is lost now; my hope, my health all sacrificed to a man's pleasure...". She later adds "I have tried every way to escape what is coming, but for some reason the usual methods failed. Frank is kinder and more reasonable than he has ever been, and very sorry for what he has done...". In August, she miscarried the baby. She had planned to return to her job at the Chattanooga News to pay back the hospital bills, but she notes in her journal, "this Frank positively refuses to let me do."

This life of continual poverty and the death of 3-year-old Mark eroded her health. In 1915, she had been diagnosed with tuberculosis. After spending several years in the Pine Breeze Sanitarium in Chattanooga, she died in a small house Frank had rented in North Chattanooga. At this time her husband and the younger children were living with his parents. While the twins, Jean and Judith, had been sent away to school. Emma Bell Miles died on March 19, 1919, and was buried in a simple grave in Red Bank, Tennessee.

== Career as writer ==
Emma and Frank struggled to make ends meet and often their major source of income was from Emma's short stories and poems. She also made money selling her art in the form of greeting cards. In 1904, Emma sold her first poem to Harper's Monthly. It was an eleven-verse poem titled "The Difference" and it appeared in the March issue. She followed that up the next month with another poem, "Homesick", written when she was living in St. Louis. She also wrote articles for local newspapers, the most popular of which were entitled The Fountain Square Conversations, a fanciful series in which birds gather at a fireman's memorial fountain in downtown Chattanooga and have philosophical conversations on life.

Emma's major success was The Spirit of the Mountains published in 1905. This genre-defying book has elements of local color, short story, travel narrative, personal memoir, and cultural analysis. The music chapter in Spirit of the Mountains was first published in 1904 as an article titled "Some Real American Music" in Harper's Monthly. It was one of the first articles that appreciated Appalachian music to appear in a popular magazine. Emma's book, Our Southern Birds, was published in 1922.

Her journals also contain several references to manuscripts of other works that remain unpublished, including The Good Gray Mother and Our Southern Flowers. Some of Emma's poetry, journals, and short stories were later published in Strains from a Dulcimore (1930), Once I Too Had Wings: The Journals of Emma Bell Miles, 1908-1918 (2014), and The Common Lot and Other Stories: The Published Short Fiction, 1908-1921 (2016).

== Legacy ==
Grace Toney Edwards gave a talk on her at the Glencoe Mansion in 2017.

== Bibliography ==
- Edwards, Grace Toney (1981), Emma Bell Miles: Appalachian Author, Artist, and Interpreter of Folk Culture, University of Virginia
- Gaston, Kay Baker (1986), Emma Bell Miles, Walden's Ridge Historical Society
- Miles, Emma Bell (2014), Cox, Steven (ed.), Once I Too Had Wings: The Journals of Emma Bell Miles, Ohio University Press, ISBN 978-0-8214-2086-7
- Special Collections and University Archives (2014), Emma Bell Miles Southern Appalachia Art and Correspondence, University of Tennessee at Chattanooga
