= Tim Benford =

American football player (born 1989)

No. 16
- Position: Wide receiver

Personal information
- Born: September 7, 1989 (age 37); Chattanooga, Tennessee
- Listed height: 5 ft 11 in (1.80 m)
- Listed weight: 196 lb (89 kg)

Career information
- High school: Red Bank (TN)
- College: Tennessee Tech
- NFL draft: 2012: undrafted

Career history
- Dallas Cowboys (2012–2014)*; Pittsburgh Steelers (2014)*
- * Offseason or practice squad member only

Awards and highlights
- OVC Freshman of the Year (2008); 3× All-OVC (2009, 2010, 2011); Ohio Valley Conference player of the year (2011)
- Stats at Pro Football Reference

Tim Benford (born September 7, 1989) is an American former football wide receiver. He previously played in the National Football League for the Dallas Cowboys and Pittsburgh Steelers. He played college football at Tennessee Tech.

== Early life ==
Benford attended Red Bank High School. He was named a starter at wide receiver as a sophomore. He received second-team All-state honors as a junior.

As a senior, he was a two-way player at wide receiver and cornerback. He established 3 new school records with 62 receptions for 1,143 yards and 17 touchdowns. He also had 14 carries for 128 yards, 2 rushing touchdowns, 38 tackles, 7 interceptions (5 returned for touchdowns). He received Region Offensive Player of the Year, All-state and Tennessean "Dream Team" honors at the end of the season.

He finished his high school career with 156 receptions for 2,396 yards and 34 receiving touchdowns. He was a three-time All-region and a two-time "Best of Preps" team selection.

== College career ==
Benford accepted a football scholarship from Tennessee Tech. He was named a starter at wide receiver as a true freshman. He tallied 68 receptions (school record and first in conference) for 782 yards (seventh in school history) and 10 receiving touchdowns (tied school record and second in conference).

As a sophomore, he appeared in 10 games, missing one contest because of injury. He led the team with 33 receptions for 580 yards and 2 receiving touchdowns. He had 6 receptions for 159 yards against the University of Tennessee at Martin. He made 5 receptions for 122 yards against Tennessee State University.

As a junior, he led the team with 50 receptions for 812 yards and 10 receiving touchdowns (tied school record).

As a senior, he appeared in 10 games, leading the team with 65 receptions for 923 yards and 5 receiving touchdowns, despite being double and even tripled teamed in some contests. He had 6 receptions for 131 yards and 2 touchdowns against Maryville College. He made 10 receptions for 122 yards against Tennessee State University. He had 8 receptions for 124 yards against Eastern Illinois University. He made 6 receptions for 116 yards and one touchdown against Murray State University. He helped the school win its first OVC championship since 1975 and qualify for its first appearance in the NCAA Football Championship Subdivision playoffs. He became the second player in school history to receive the Ohio Valley Conference Offensive Player of the Year award. He also played in the 2012 East–West Shrine Game.

He finished his college career ranked number one All-time in school history and third All-time in OVC history with 216 receptions for 3,097 yards. He also set the school record with 27 career touchdowns.

== Professional career ==
=== Dallas Cowboys ===
Benford was signed as an undrafted free agent by the Dallas Cowboys after the 2012 NFL draft. He was waived before the season started on August 31, and was signed to the team's practice squad on September 1.

He was released on August 31, 2013, and signed to the practice squad on September 1. He was signed to a reserve/future contract on December 30. The Cowboys waived Benford on August 27, 2014, and re-signed him to the practice squad on August 31. He was released on October 7.

=== Pittsburgh Steelers ===
On December 30, 2014, he was signed by the Pittsburgh Steelers to the team's practice squad. On January 1, 2015, he was placed on the injured reserve list. He was released before the start of the season.

=== Washington Valor (AFL) ===
On March 20, 2017, Benford was assigned to the Washington Valor of the Arena Football League. He was placed on reassignment on March 25. He never signed with the franchise.

== Personal life ==
Benford was born in Chattanooga, Tennessee to Tim Lloyd and Karen Davis. His major in college was Interdisciplinary Studies.
