= Tennessee River Gorge =

Canyon in Tennessee and Alabama, U.S.

Coordinates: 35.028°N 85.545°W

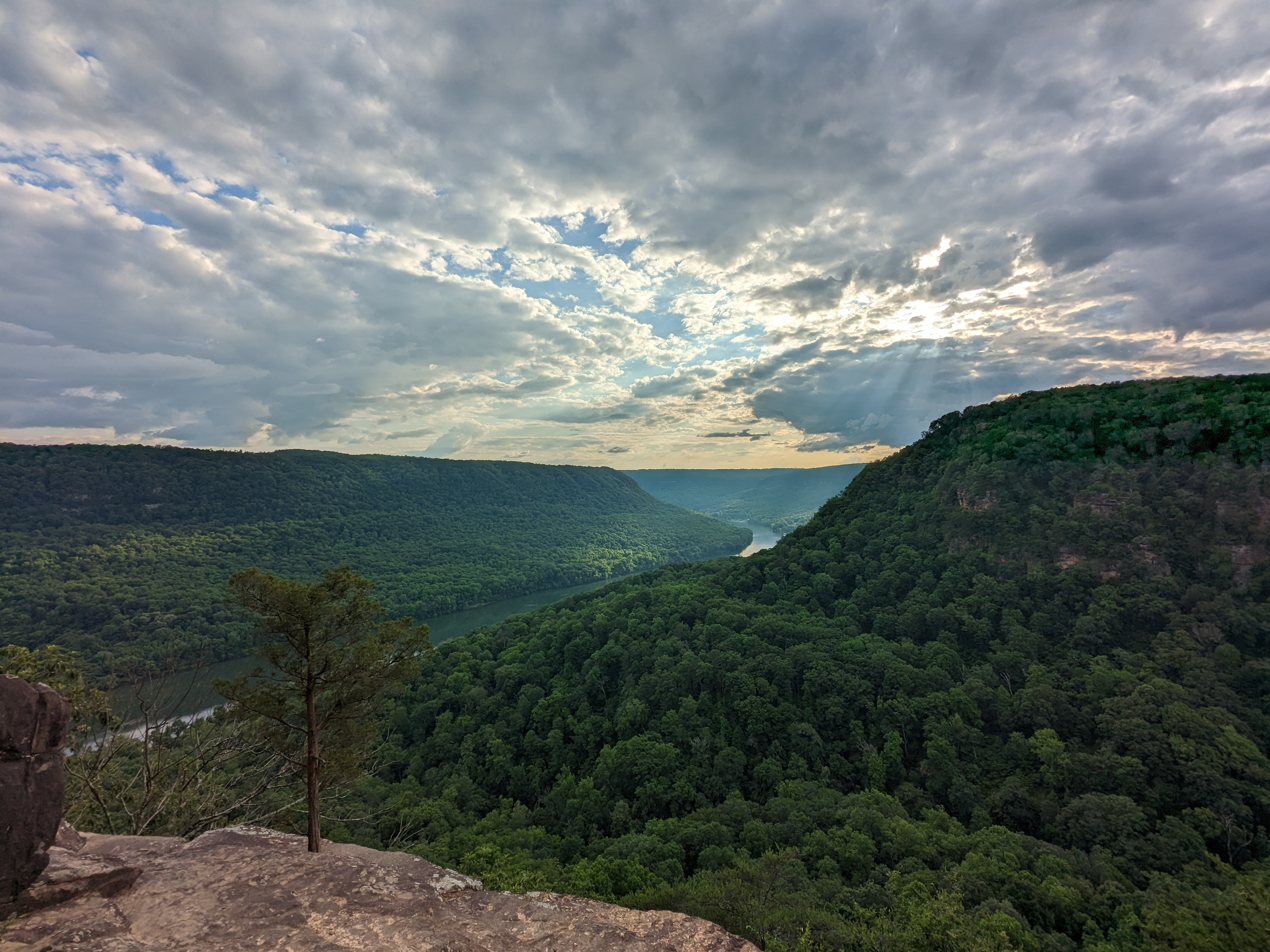
View of the gorge from Julia Falls Outlook

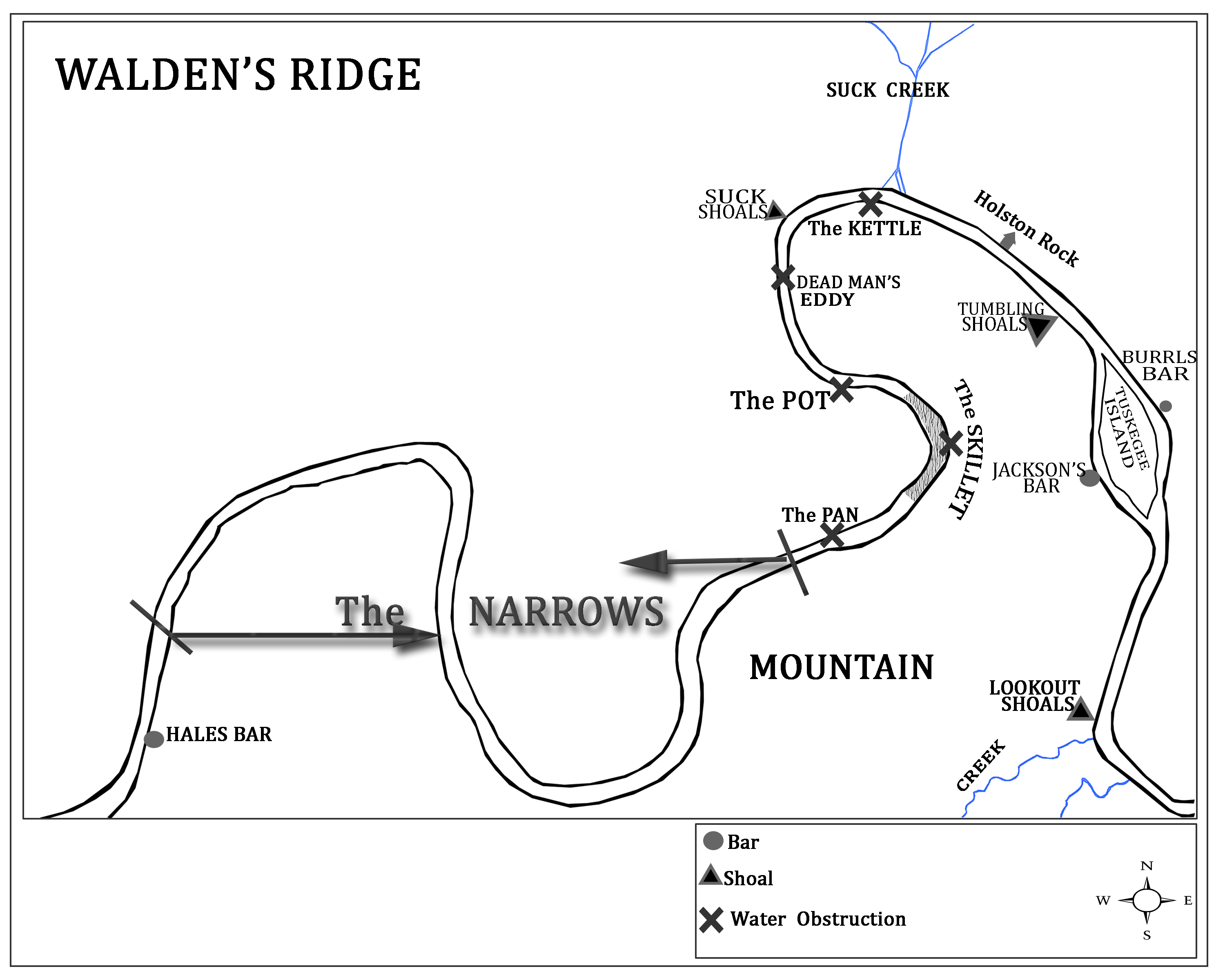
Map of the hazards in the river prior to the closing of the locks of Hales Bar Dam in 1913

The Tennessee River Gorge is a 26-mile (42 km) canyon in the U.S. states of Tennessee and Alabama formed by the Tennessee River. The fourth largest river gorge in the Eastern United States, it was cut into the Cumberland Plateau where the river winds from southeast Tennessee into northeast Alabama. Previously known as Walden Gorge, it cuts through Walden Ridge, dividing the ridge into Sand Mountain, Alabama, on its south. Locally, the gorge is known as Cash Canyon.

== History ==
Many archaeological sites have been discovered in the gorge that show that people have been dwelling in the canyon for at least 10,000 years.

Prior to the completion of Hales Bar Dam in 1913 and the subsequent raising of the water level, the stretch of the Tennessee River flowing through the gorge was notorious for its whirlpools, eddies, shoals, and one huge rock. Beginning with Williams' Island and the sandbars on either side of it, these navigational hazards included Tumbling Shoals, the Holston Rock, the Kettle, the Suck Shoals, the Deadman's Eddy, the Pot, the Skillet, the Pan, and, finally, the ten-mile Narrows, ending with Hale's Bar.

As of 2018, 17,000 acres (6,900 ha) of land in the gorge out of 27,000 acres (11,000 ha) sought for preservation have been purchased or otherwise secured for conservation by the Tennessee River Gorge Trust, a non-profit conservation trust founded in 1981. The trust also does scientific studies, develops trails, and conducts education efforts. Prentice Cooper State Forest is on the northern edge of the gorge.

== Ecology ==
The Tennessee River Gorge is home to endangered species, including the perennial forb mountain skullcap.

== Image gallery ==
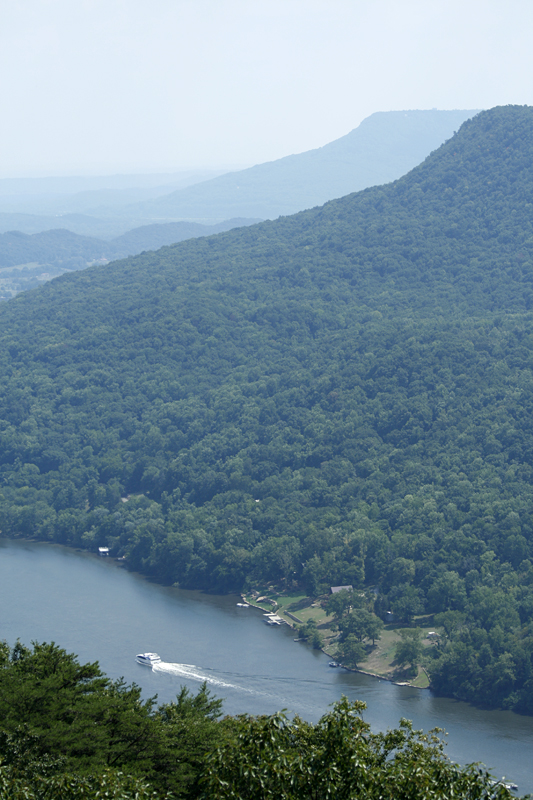
View from Signal Point, looking east

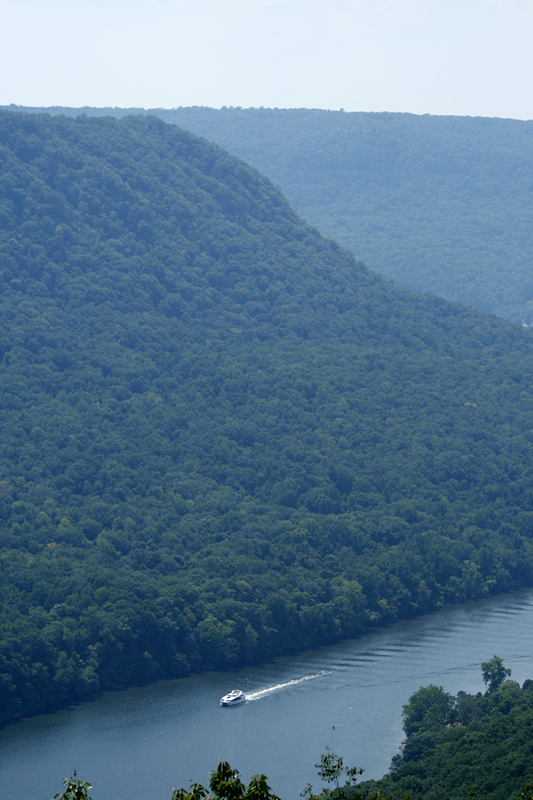
View from Signal Point, looking west

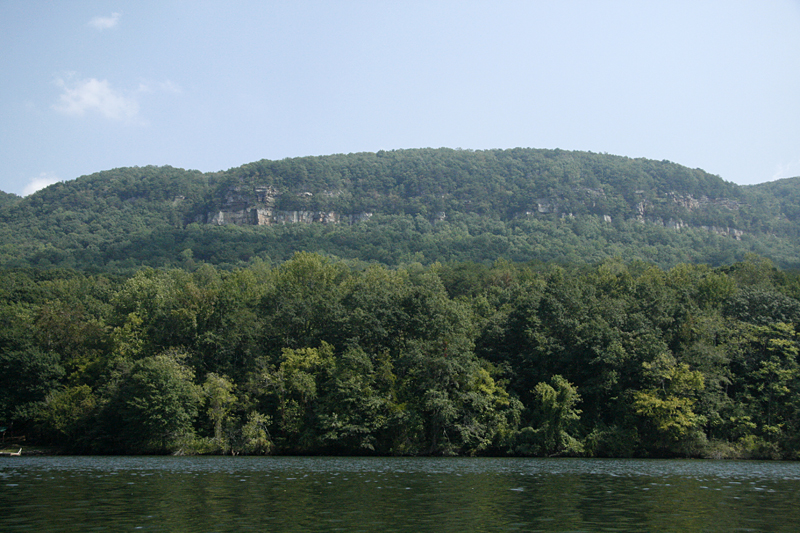
Elder Mountain
