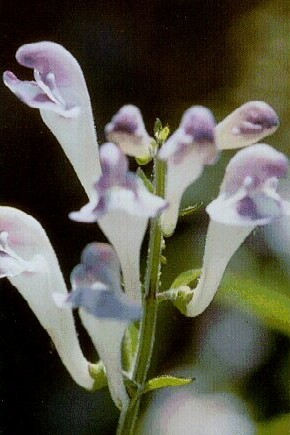

Conservation status
- Vulnerable (NatureServe)

Scientific classification
- Kingdom: Plantae
- Clade: Embryophytes
- Clade: Tracheophytes
- Clade: Spermatophytes
- Clade: Angiosperms
- Clade: Eudicots
- Clade: Asterids
- Order: Lamiales
- Family: Lamiaceae
- Genus: Scutellaria
- Species: S. montana

Binomial name
- Scutellaria montana Chapm.

= Scutellaria montana =

Species of flowering plant

Scutellaria montana, with the common names largeflower skullcap, large-flowered skullcap and mountain skullcap, is a perennial forb first described by Alvan Chapman in 1878. This narrowly endemic species is found in the southeastern United States in parts of the Ridge and Valley and Cumberland Plateau Physiographic Provinces. Populations have been documented from four Tennessee counties and nine Georgia counties and is protected under the US Endangered Species act as it is a threatened species. The Latin specific epithet montana refers to mountains or coming from mountains.

== Description ==
This plant has a single, erect square stem and may grow 30 to 60 cm in height. The leaves are simple, opposite in arrangement, lanceolate to ovate with crenate to serrate margins, and the blades are 5 to 8 cm long and 3 to 5 cm wide. Characteristic to this species, the leaves have a soft pubescence with glandular and non-glandular hairs on both surfaces. As the common name suggests, the inflorescence are large at 2.6 to 3.5 cm long; flowers are terminal and blue and white in color. Another characteristic specific to this species and used to distinguish it from other Scutellaria species is that the inflorescence lack an annulus within the corolla tube near the top of the calyx; this is the only species of Scutellaria Section Annulatae that is exannulate. Flowers bloom from mid-May to June, and fruits mature in June and early July.

== Habitat ==
This plant grows in mid- to late-successional forests dominated by oak and pine trees, most often Quercus alba, Q. velutina, and/or Q. montana, and Pinus echinata or P. taeda. The soil is acidic, rocky, and shallow, sometimes as shallow as 3 centimeters. It is dry to somewhat moist in the habitat. Other plants in the habitat include Desmodium spp., Hexastylis spp., Chimaphila maculata, and Cornus florida.

This plant was federally listed as an endangered species in 1986. When more populations were discovered, it was downlisted to threatened status in 2002. It is still threatened by human activity such as logging, suburban development, and quarrying.
