= Tennessee River Gorge Trust =

The Tennessee River Gorge Trust is a non-profit land trust conservation group acquiring and maintaining conservation areas, building trails, and conducting environmental studies and education programs in the Tennessee River Gorge near Chattanooga, Tennessee. It is involved in preserving natural areas along the Tennessee River. The group was established in 1981.

== Activities ==
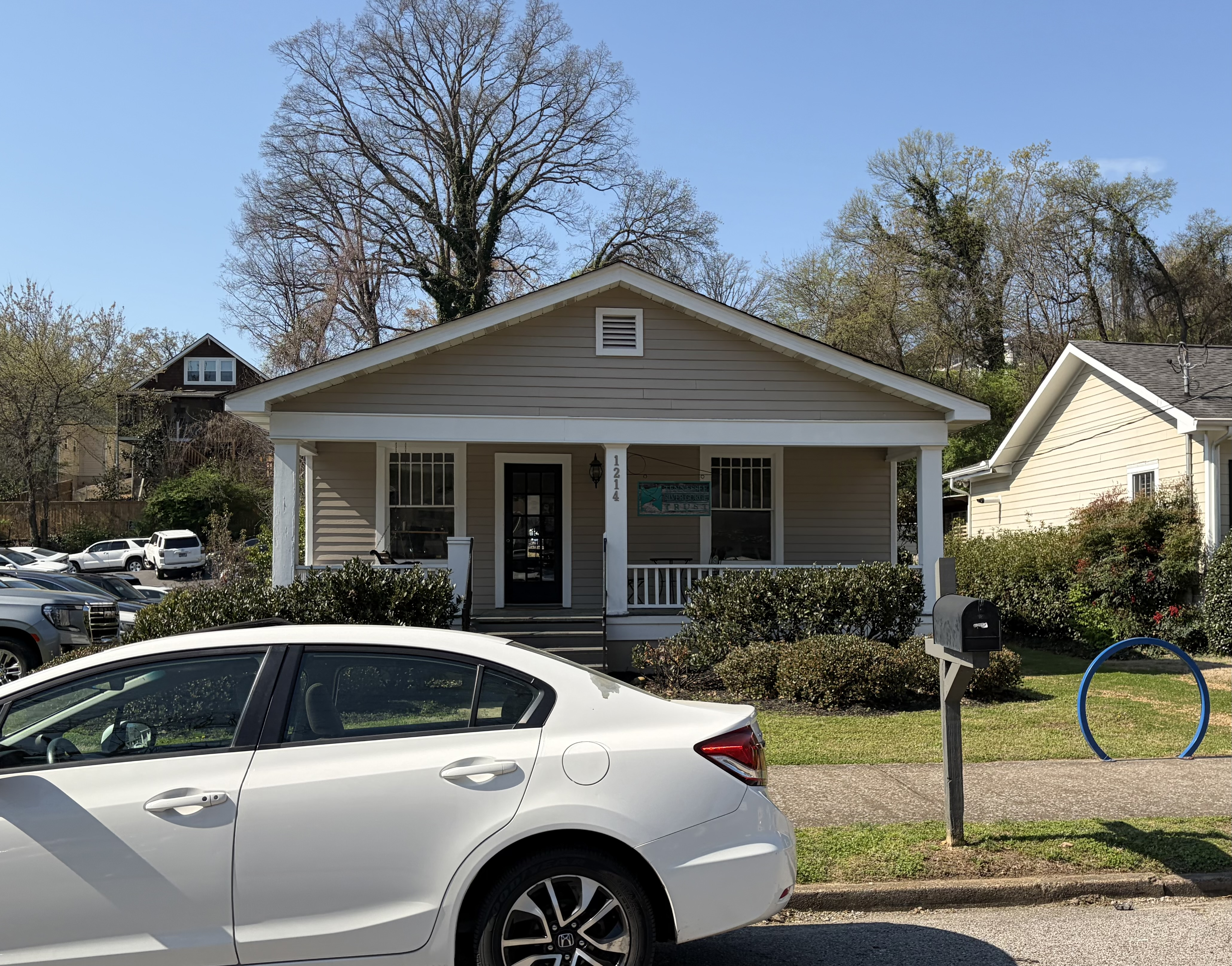
The headquarters of the Tennessee River Gorge Trust in North Chattanooga, Tennessee

The Trust outright purchases property, seeks donations, and enters into conservation easements with private land owners. Since 1981 they have secured ownership or protection for more than 17,000 acres of the 27,000 acres in the target area. Black charcoal drawings have been found in caves on trust property. The trust offers hiking trails and educational programs. Studies on trust properties include bird banding of cerulean warblers and worm-eating warblers. The group led development of the 2.5.mile Ritchie Hollow Trail. The Trust received a $250,000 donation in Bitcoin from an anonymous donor using the pseudonym Pine in 2018.

The group has been steward for several areas and ecologically significant sites including:

- Bill McNabb Gulf
- Bluff Point / Hicks Mountain
- Cummings Lake
- Ellis Spring (Tennessee)
- Kelly's Ferry Slopes
- Lassiter Property
- Parker Gap Cove
- Piney Branch Bottomland
- Pot Point
- Renfro Property
- Dry Creek Ravine
- Mile 434 Oaks
- Pryor Property
- Smith Property
- Rutledge Falls

Numerous trust lands are near the uncompleted Bellefonte Nuclear Plant.

Executive Director John C. Brown testified before a U.S. House of representatives Appropriations subcommittee in 2000.
