= History of United States prison systems =

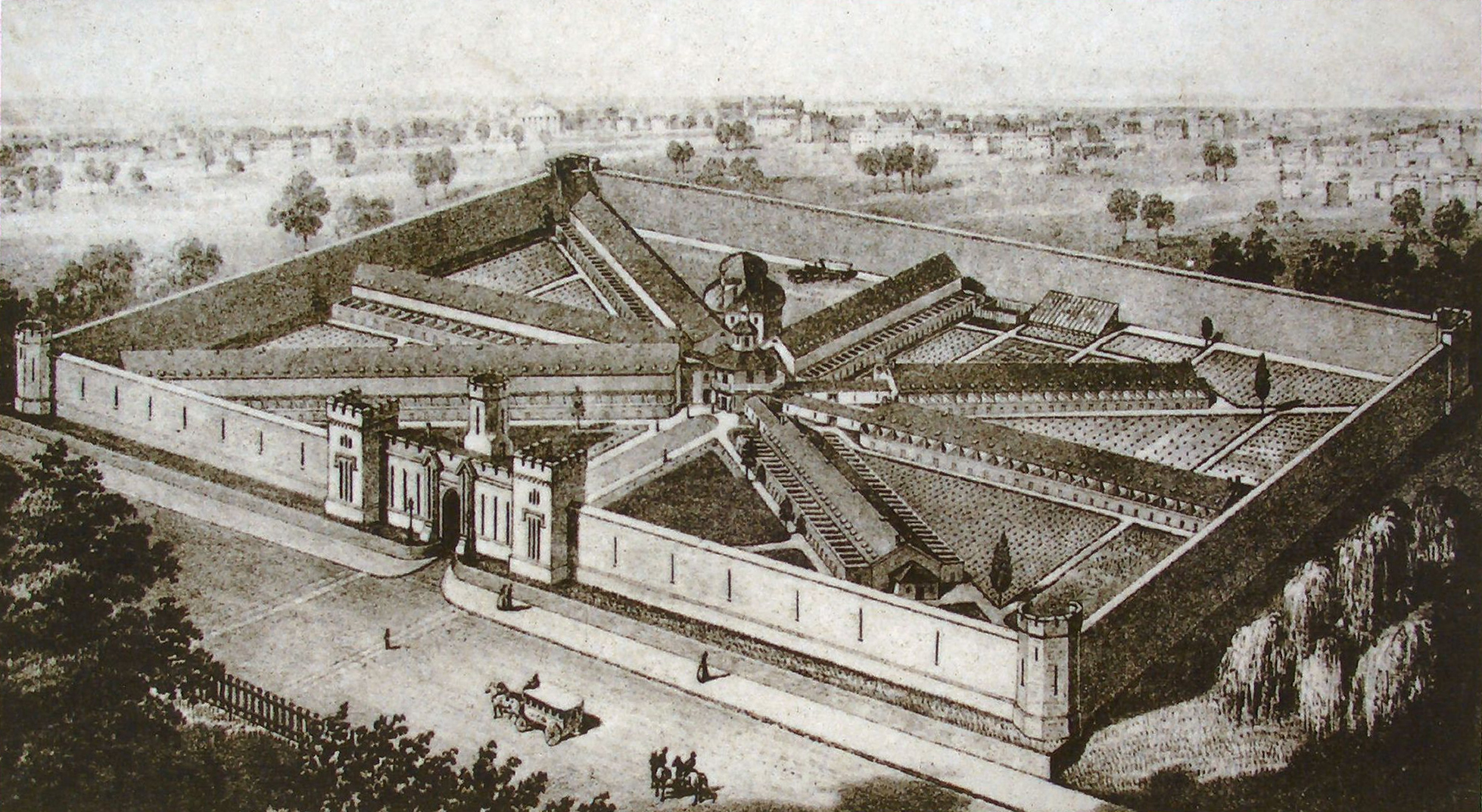
Eastern State Penitentiary, opened in 1829 during the first major wave of penitentiary building in the United States.

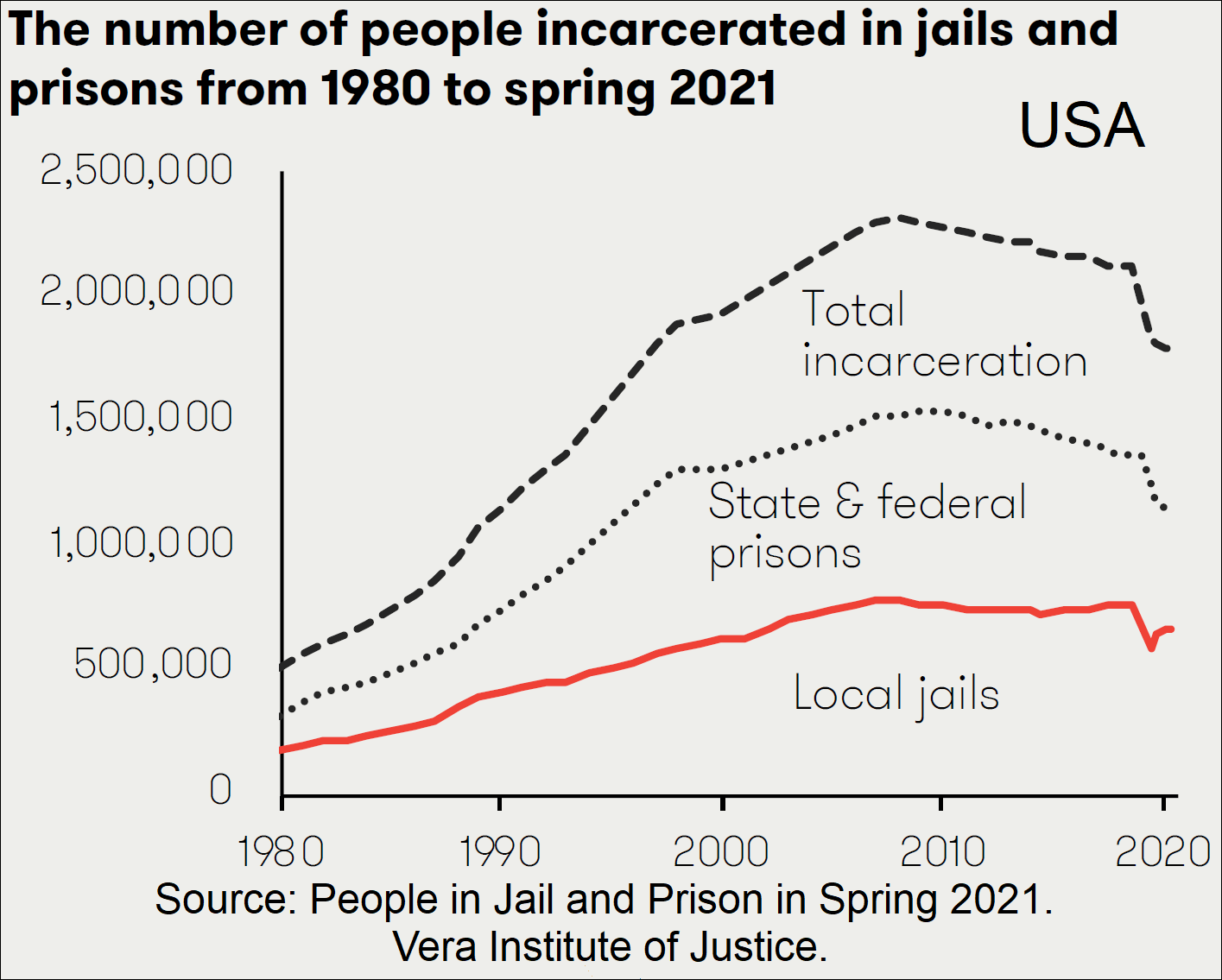
US timeline graphs of number of people incarcerated in jails and prisons.

Imprisonment began to replace other forms of criminal punishment in the United States just before the American Revolution, though penal incarceration efforts had been ongoing in England since as early as the 1500s, and prisons in the form of dungeons and various detention facilities had existed as early as the first sovereign states. In colonial times, courts and magistrates would impose punishments including fines, forced labor, public restraint, flogging, maiming, and death, with sheriffs detaining some defendants awaiting trial. The use of confinement as a punishment in itself was originally seen as a more humane alternative to capital and corporal punishment, especially among Quakers in Pennsylvania. Prison building efforts in the United States came in three major waves. The first began during the Jacksonian Era and led to the widespread use of imprisonment and rehabilitative labor as the primary penalty for most crimes in nearly all states by the time of the American Civil War. The second began after the Civil War and gained momentum during the Progressive Era, bringing a number of new mechanisms—such as parole, probation, and indeterminate sentencing—into the mainstream of American penal practice. Finally, since the early 1970s, the United States has engaged in a historically unprecedented expansion of its imprisonment systems at both the federal and state level. Since 1973, the number of incarcerated persons in the United States has increased five-fold. Now, about 2,200,000 people, or 3.2 percent of the adult population, are imprisoned in the United States, and about 7,000,000 are under supervision of some form in the correctional system, including parole and probation. Periods of prison construction and reform produced major changes in the structure of prison systems and their missions, the responsibilities of federal and state agencies for administering and supervising them, as well as the legal and political status of prisoners themselves.

== Intellectual origins of United States prisons ==
Incarceration as a form of criminal punishment is "a comparatively recent episode in Anglo-American jurisprudence," according to historian Adam J. Hirsch. Before the nineteenth century, sentences of penal confinement were rare in the criminal courts of British North America. But penal incarceration had been utilized in England as early as the reign of the Tudors, if not before. When post-revolutionary prisons emerged in the United States, they were, in Hirsch's words, not a "fundamental departure" from the former American colonies' intellectual past. Early American prisons systems like Massachusetts' Castle Island Penitentiary, built in 1780, essentially imitated the model of the 1500s English workhouse.

== Prisons in America ==
Although early colonization of prisons were influenced by the England law and Sovereignty and their reactions to criminal offenses, it also had a mix of religious aptitude toward the punishment of the crime. Because of the low population in the eastern states it was hard to follow the criminal codes in place and which led to law changes in America. It was the population boom in the eastern states that led to the reformation of the prison system in the U.S. According to the Oxford History of the Prison, in order to function prisons "keep prisoners in custody, maintain order, control discipline and a safe environment, provide decent conditions for prisoners and meet their needs, including health care, provide positive regimes which help prisoners address their offending behavior and allow them as full responsible a life as possible and help prisoners prepare for their return to their community"

Incarcerating prisoners has long been an idea in the history of man. U.S prisons adopted some ideas from history when it came to confining criminals. According to Bruce Johnston, "of course the notion of forcibly confining people is ancient, and there is extensive evidence that the Romans had a well developed system for imprisoning different types of offenders" It wasn't until 1789 when reform started taking place in America. David J. Rothman suggests that it was the freedom of our independence that helped along the reformation of the law. Laws were changed in New York because they were too "barbarous and had Monarchial principles," according to Rothman. Pennsylvania laws had changed, excluding the act of robbery and burglary from crimes punishable by death, leaving only first degree murder. New York, New Jersey, and Virginia updated and reduced their capital crime lists. This reduction of capital crimes created a need for other forms of punishment, which led to incarceration of longer periods of time. The oldest prison was built in York, Maine in 1720. The very first jail that turned into a state prison was the Walnut Street Jail. This led to uprisings of state prisons across the eastern border states of America. Newgate State Prison in Greenwich Village was built in 1796, New Jersey added its prison facility in 1797, Virginia and Kentucky in 1800, and Vermont, New Hampshire, and Maryland followed soon after.

Americans were in favour of reform in the early 1800s. They had ideas that rehabilitating prisoners to become law-abiding citizens was the next step. They needed to change the prison system's functions. Jacksonian American reformers hoped that changing the way they developed the institutions would give the inmates the tools needed to change. Auburn state prison became the first prison to implement the rehabilitative idea. The function of the prison was to isolate, teach obedience, and use labor for the means of production through the inmates. According to Rothman, "Reform, not deterrence, was now the aim of incarceration." Soon a rivalry plan stepped into place through the Pennsylvania model which functioned almost the same as the Auburn model except for eliminating human contact. This meant that inmates were incarcerated in cells alone, ate alone, and could only see approved visitors.

The development of prisons changed from the 1800s to the modern day era. As of 1990 there were over 750,000 people held in state prison or county jails. Prisons hadn't been designed to house such a high number of incarcerated individuals. With the development of new material and ideas, prisons changed physically to accommodate the rising population. Although the prison maintained the high wall method, it added new modern technology such as surveillance and electronically monitored perimeters, and changed the way prisons are operated. The change of prison operating system has led to branching prisons off into multiple factors to meet the needs of the incarcerated population. Norval Morris in The Contemporary Prison writes "there are 'open prisons'... 'weekend prisons' and 'day prisons'." This is not to say the change of punishment has completely changed in redevelopment of the early prison system. It still maintains social order and is moved by politics and ever changing matters.

=== The English workhouse ===
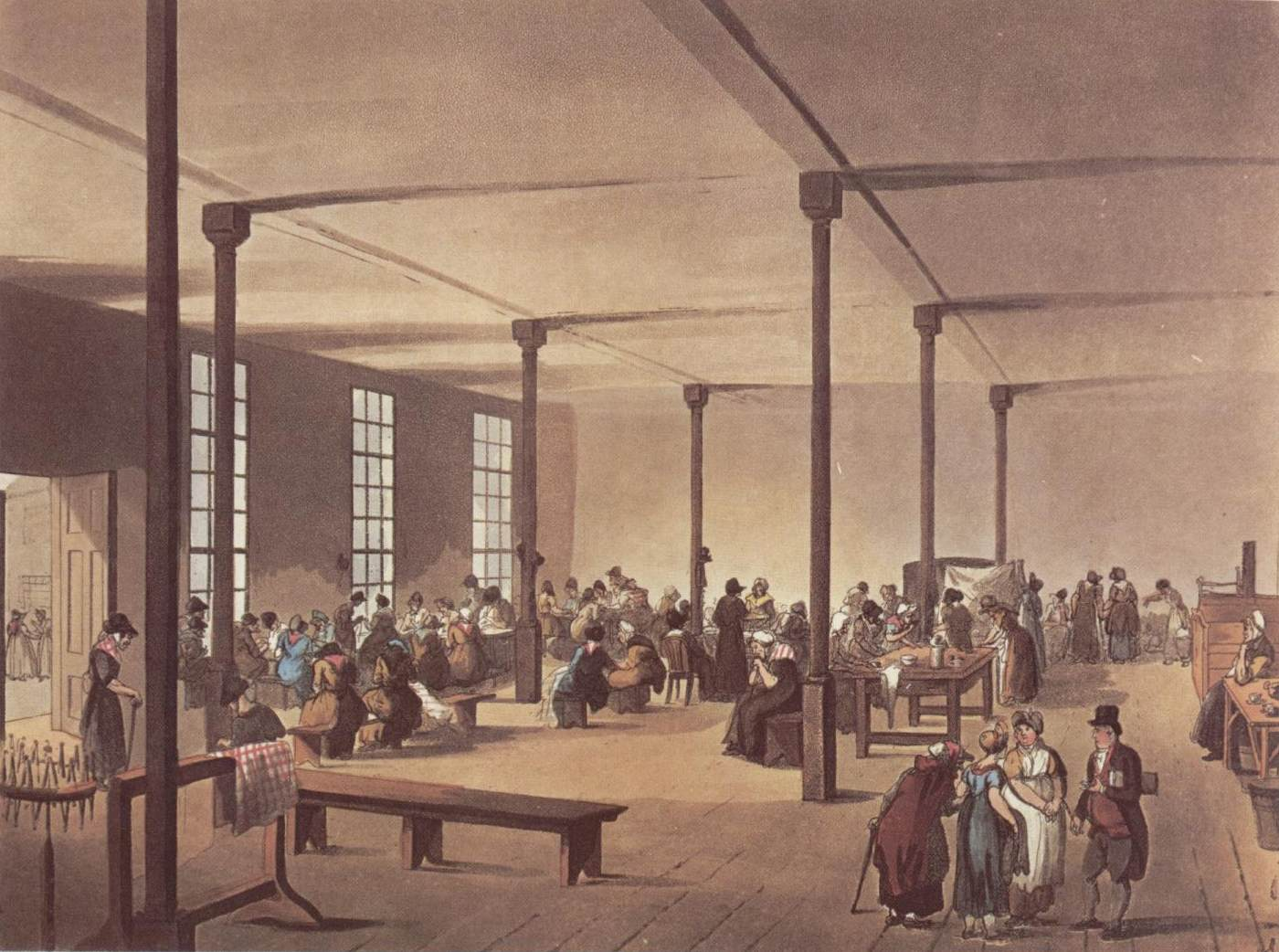
"The workroom at St James's workhouse", from The Microcosm of London (1808)

The English workhouse, an intellectual forerunner of early United States penitentiaries, was first developed as a "cure" for the idleness of the poor. Over time English officials and reformers came to see the workhouse as a more general system for rehabilitating criminals of all kinds.

Common wisdom in the England of the 1500s attributed property crime to idleness. "Idleness" had been a status crime since Parliament enacted the Statute of Laborers in the mid-fourteenth century. By 1530, English subjects convicted of leading a "Rogishe or Vagabonds Trade or Lyfe" were subject to whipping and mutilation, and recidivists could face the death penalty.

In 1557, many in England perceived that vagrancy was on the rise. That same year, the City of London reopened the Bridewell as a warehouse for vagrants arrested within the city limits. By order of any two of the Bridewell's governors, a person could be committed to the prison for a term of custody ranging from several weeks to several years. In the decades that followed, "houses of correction" or "workhouses" like the Bridewell became a fixture of towns across England—a change made permanent when Parliament began requiring every county in the realm to build a workhouse in 1576.

The workhouse was not just a custodial institution. At least some of its proponents hoped that the experience of incarceration would rehabilitate workhouse residents through hard labor. Supporters expressed the belief that forced abstinence from "idleness" would make vagrants into productive citizens. Other supporters argued that the threat of the workhouse would deter vagrancy, and that inmate labor could provide a means of support for the workhouse itself. Governance of these institutions was controlled by written regulations promulgated by local authorities, and local justices of the peace monitored compliance.

Although "vagrants" were the first inhabitants of the workhouse—not felons or other criminals—expansion of its use to criminals was discussed. Sir Thomas More described in Utopia (1516) how an ideal government should punish citizens with slavery, not death, and expressly recommended use of penal enslavement in England. Thomas Starkey, chaplain to Henry VIII, suggested that convicted felons "be put in some commyn work . . . so by theyr life yet the commyn welth schold take some profit." Edward Hext, justice of the peace in Somersetshire in the 1500s, recommended that criminals be put to labor in the workhouse after receiving the traditional punishments of the day.

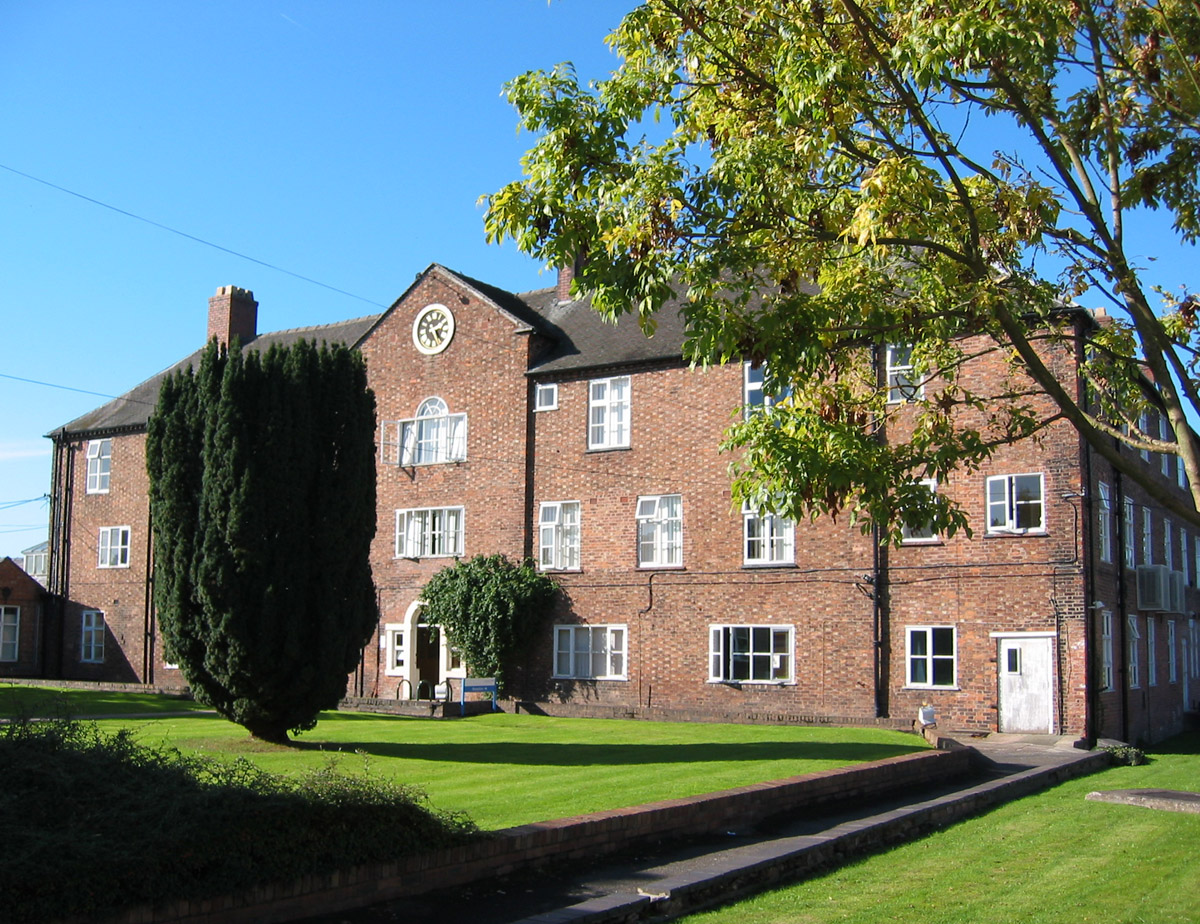
Former workhouse in Nantwich, dating from 1780

During the seventeenth and eighteenth centuries, several programs experimented with sentencing various petty criminals to the workhouse. Many petty criminals were sentenced to the workhouse by way of the vagrancy laws even before these efforts. A commission appointed by King James I in 1622 to reprieve felons condemned to death with banishment to the American colonies was also given authority to sentence offenders "to toyle in some such heavie and painful manuall workes and labors here at home and be kept in chains in the house of correction or other places," until the King or his ministers decided otherwise. Within three years, a growing body of laws authorized incarceration in the workhouse for specifically enumerated petty crimes.

Throughout the 1700s, even as England's "Bloody Code" took shape, incarceration at hard labor was held out as an acceptable punishment for criminals of various kinds—e.g., those who received a suspended death sentence via the benefit of clergy or a pardon, those who were not transported to the colonies, or those convicted of petty larceny. In 1779—at a time when the American Revolution had made convict transportation to North America impracticable—the English Parliament passed the Penitentiary Act, mandating the construction of two London prisons with internal regulations modeled on the Dutch workhouse—i.e., prisoners would labor more or less constantly during the day, with their diet, clothing, and communication strictly controlled. Although the Penitentiary Act promised to make penal incarceration the focal point of English criminal law, a series of the penitentiaries it prescribed were never constructed.

Despite the ultimate failure of the Penitentiary Act, however, the legislation marked the culmination of a series of legislative efforts that "disclose[] the . . . antiquity, continuity, and durability" of rehabilitative incarceration ideology in Anglo-American criminal law, according to historian Adam J. Hirsch. The first United States penitentiaries involved elements of the early English workhouses—hard labor by day and strict supervision of inmates.

=== English philanthropist penology ===
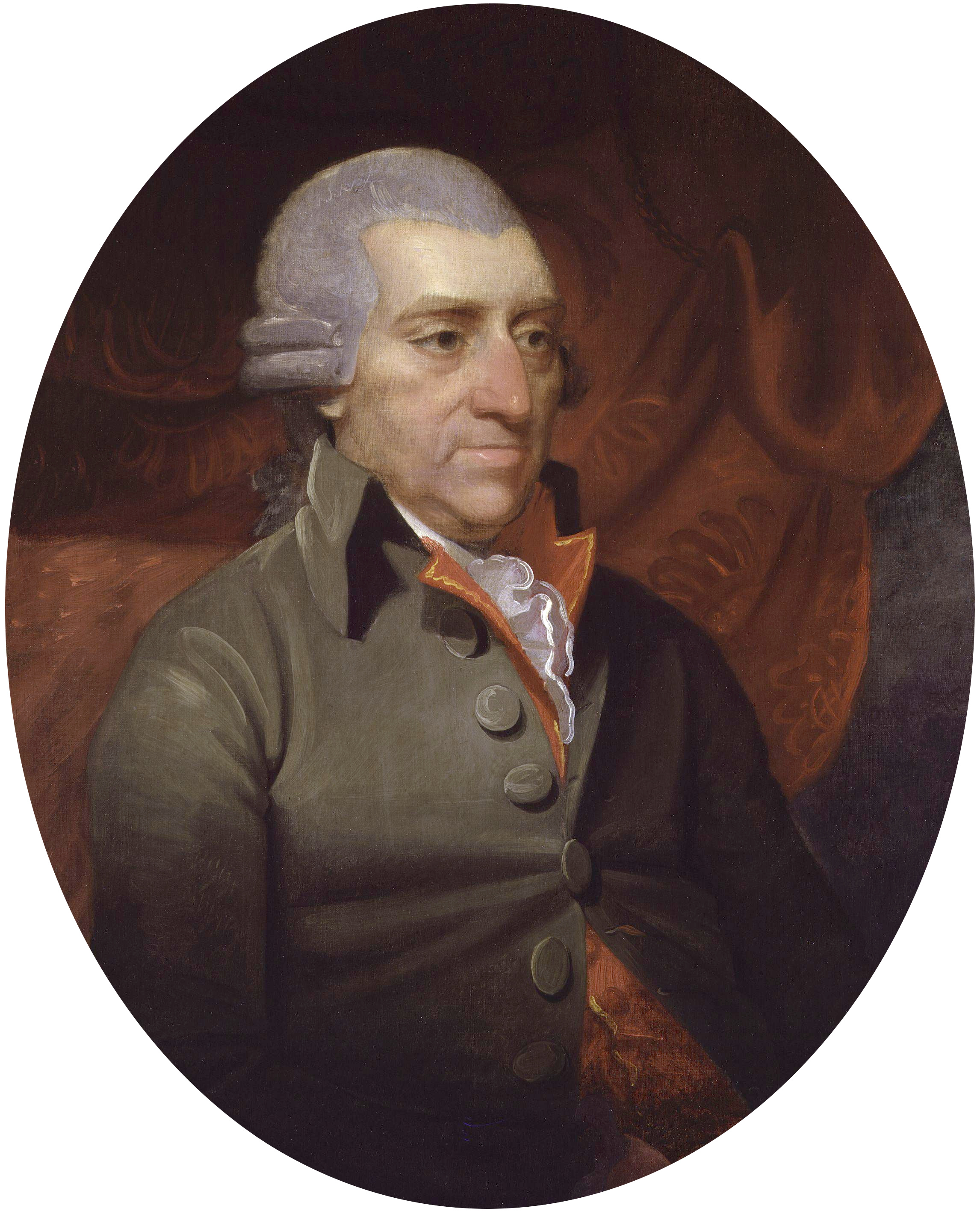
John Howard, English philanthropist penal reformer.

A second group that supported penal incarceration in England included clergymen and "lay pietists" of various religious denominations who made efforts during the 1700s to reduce the severity of the English criminal justice system. Initially, reformers like John Howard focused on the harsh conditions of pre-trial detention in English jails. But many philanthropists did not limit their efforts to jail administration and inmate hygiene; they were also interested in the spiritual health of inmates and curbing the common practice of mixing all prisoners together at random. Their ideas about inmate classification and solitary confinement match another undercurrent of penal innovation in the United States that persisted into the Progressive Era.

Beginning with Samuel Denne's Letter to Lord Ladbroke (1771) and Jonas Hanway's Solitude in Imprisonment (1776), philanthropic literature on English penal reform began to concentrate on the post-conviction rehabilitation of criminals in the prison setting. Although they did not speak with a single voice, the philanthropist penologists tended to view crime as an outbreak of the criminal's estrangement from God. Hanway, for example, believed that the challenge of rehabilitating the criminal law lay in restoring his faith in, and fear of the Christian God, in order to "qualify [him] for happiness in both worlds."

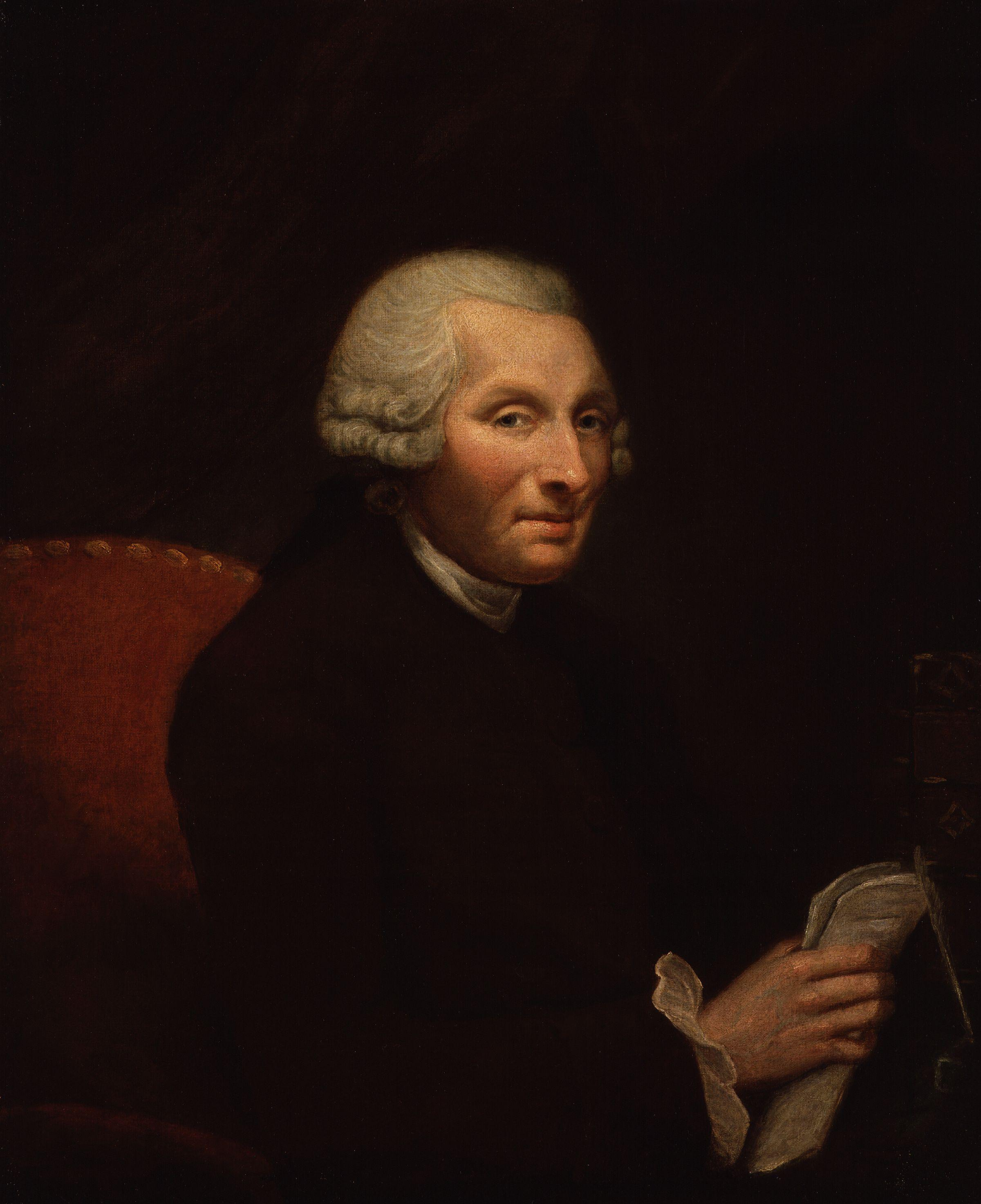
Philanthropist penal reformer Jonas Hanway, author of Solitude in Imprisonment (1776), circa 1785.

Many eighteenth-century English philanthropists proposed solitary confinement as a way to rehabilitate inmates morally. Since at least 1740, philanthropic thinkers touted the use of penal solitude for two primary purposes: (1) to isolate prison inmates from the moral contagion of other prisoners, and (2) to jump-start their spiritual recovery. The philanthropists found solitude far superior to hard labor, which only reached the convict's worldly self, failing to get at the underlying spiritual causes of crime. In their conception of prison as a "penitentiary," or place of repentance for sin, the English philanthropists departed from Continental models and gave birth to a largely novel idea—according to social historians Michael Meranze and Michael Ignatieff—which in turn found its way into penal practice in the United States.

A major political obstacle to implementing the philanthropists' solitary program in England was financial: Building individual cells for each prisoner cost more than the congregate housing arrangements typical of eighteenth-century English jails. But by the 1790s, local solitary confinement facilities for convicted criminals appeared in Gloucestershire and several other English counties.

The philanthropists' focus on isolation and moral contamination became the foundation for early penitentiaries in the United States. Philadelphians of the period eagerly followed the reports of philanthropist reformer John Howard And the archetypical penitentiaries that emerged in the 1820s United States—e.g., Auburn and Eastern State penitentiaries—both implemented a solitary regime aimed at morally rehabilitating prisoners. The concept of inmate classification—or dividing prisoners according to their behavior, age, etc.—remains in use in United States prisons to this day.

=== Rationalist penology ===
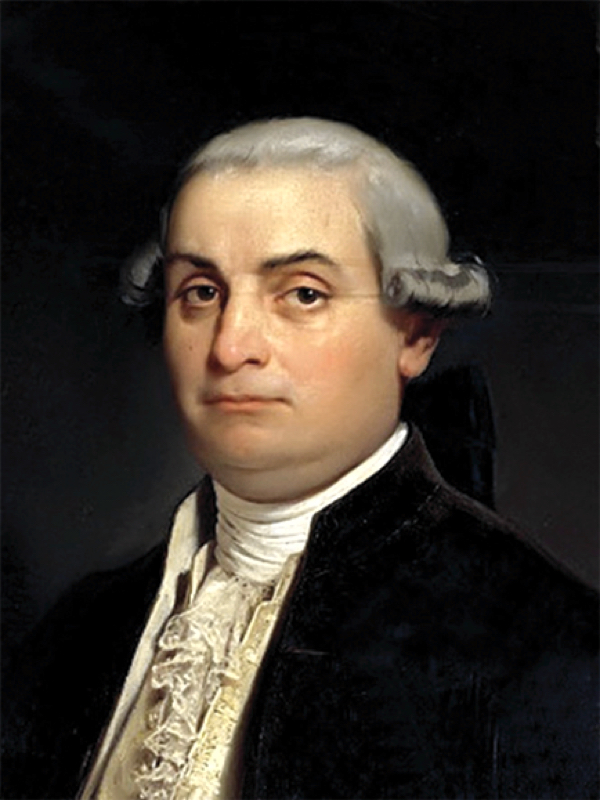
Cesare Beccaria, Italian rationalist penal reformer and author of On Crimes and Punishments (1764).

A third group involved in English penal reform were the "rationalists" or "utilitarians". According to historian Adam J. Hirsch, eighteenth-century rationalist criminology "rejected scripture in favor of human logic and reason as the only valid guide to constructing social institutions.

Eighteenth-century rational philosophers like Cesare Beccaria and Jeremy Bentham developed a "novel theory of crime"—specifically, that what made an action subject to criminal punishment was the harm it caused to other members of society. For the rationalists, sins that did not result in social harm were outside the purview of civil courts. With John Locke's "sensational psychology" as a guide, which maintained that environment alone defined human behavior, many rationalists sought the roots of a criminal's behavior in his or her past environment.

Rationalists differed as to what environmental factors gave rise to criminality. Some rationalists, including Cesare Beccaria, blamed criminality on the uncertainty of criminal punishment, whereas earlier criminologists had linked criminal deterrence to the severity of punishment. In essence, Beccaria believed that where arrest, conviction, and sentencing for crime were "rapid and infallible," punishments for crime could remain moderate. Beccaria did not take issue with the substance of contemporary penal codes—e.g., whipping and the pillory; rather, he took issue with their form and implementation.

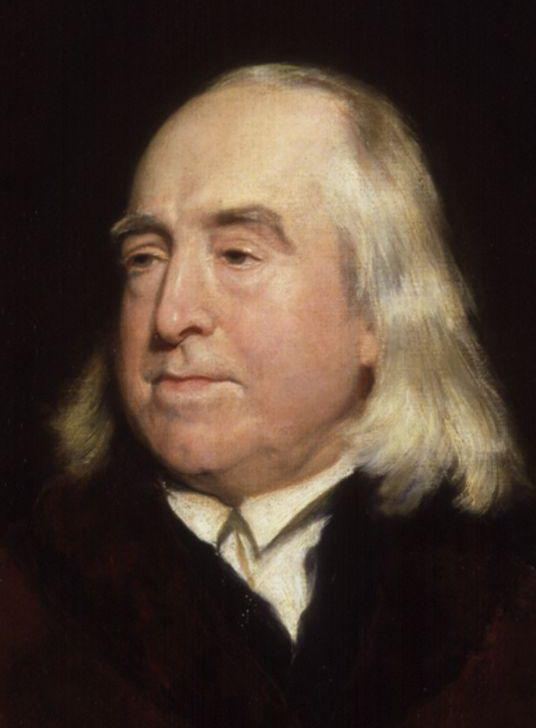
Jeremy Bentham, English rationalist penal reformer and designer of the Panopticon.

Other rationalists, like Jeremy Bentham, believed that deterrence alone could not end criminality and looked instead to the social environment as the ultimate source of crime. Bentham's conception of criminality led him to concur with philanthropist reformers on the need for rehabilitation of offenders. But, unlike the philanthropists, Bentham and like-minded rationalists believed the true goal of rehabilitation was to show convicts the logical "inexpedience" of crime, not their estrangement from religion. For these rationalists, society was the source of and the solution to crime.

Ultimately, hard labor became the preferred rationalist therapy. Bentham eventually adopted this approach, and his well-known 1791 design for the Panopticon prison called for inmates to labor in solitary cells for the course of their imprisonment. Another rationalist, William Eden, collaborated with John Howard and Justice William Blackstone in drafting the Penitentiary Act 1779, which called for a penal regime of hard labor.

According to social and legal historian Adam J. Hirsch, the rationalists had only a secondary impact on United States penal practices. But their ideas—whether consciously adopted by United States prison reformers or not—resonate in various United States penal initiatives to the present day.

== Historical development of United States prison systems ==
Although convicts played a significant role in British settlement of North America, according to legal historian Adam J. Hirsch "[t]he wholesale incarceration of criminals is in truth a comparatively recent episode in the history of Anglo-American jurisprudence." Imprisonment facilities were present from the earliest English settlement of North America, but the fundamental purpose of these facilities changed in the early years of United States legal history as a result of a geographically widespread "penitentiary" movement. The form and function of prison systems in the United States has continued to change as a result of political and scientific developments, as well as notable reform movements during the Jacksonian Era, Reconstruction Era, Progressive Era, and the 1970s. But the status of penal incarceration as the primary mechanism for criminal punishment has remained the same since its first emergence in the wake of the American Revolution.

=== Early settlement, convict transportation, and the prisoner trade ===
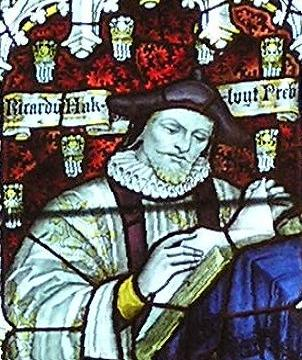
Richard Hakluyt, promoter of large-scale English settlement in the Jamestown Colony by convicts, as depicted in stained glass in the west window of the south transept of Bristol Cathedral.

Prisoners and prisons appeared in North America simultaneous to the arrival of European settlers. Among the ninety or so men who sailed with the explorer known as Christopher Columbus were a young black man abducted from the Canary Islands and at least four convicts. By 1570, Spanish soldiers in St. Augustine, Florida, had built the first substantial prison in North America. As other European nations began to compete with Spain for land and wealth in the New World, they too turned to convicts to fill out the crews on their ships.

According to social historian Marie Gottschalk, convicts were "indispensable" to English settlement efforts in what is now the United States. In the late sixteenth century, Richard Hakluyt called for the large-scale conscription of criminals to settle the New World for England. But official action on Haklyut's proposal lagged until 1606, when the English crown escalated its colonization efforts.

Sir John Popham's colonial venture in present-day Maine was stocked, a contemporary critic complained, "out of all the gaols [jails] of England." The Virginia Company, the corporate entity responsible for settling Jamestown, authorized its colonists to seize Native American children wherever they could "for conversion ... to the knowledge and worship of the true God and their redeemer, Christ Jesus." The colonists themselves lived, in effect, as prisoners of the Company's governor and his agents. Men caught trying to escape were tortured to death; seamstresses who erred in their sewing were subject to whipping. One Richard Barnes, accused of uttering "base and detracting words" against the governor, was ordered to be "disarmed and have his arms broken and his tongue bored through with an awl" before being banished from the settlement entirely.

When control of the Virginia Company passed to Sir Edwin Sandys in 1618, efforts to bring large numbers of settlers to the New World against their will gained traction alongside less coercive measures like indentured servitude. Vagrancy statutes began to provide for penal transportation to the American colonies as an alternative to capital punishment in this period, during the reign of Queen Elizabeth I. At the same time, the legal definition of "vagrancy" was greatly expanded.

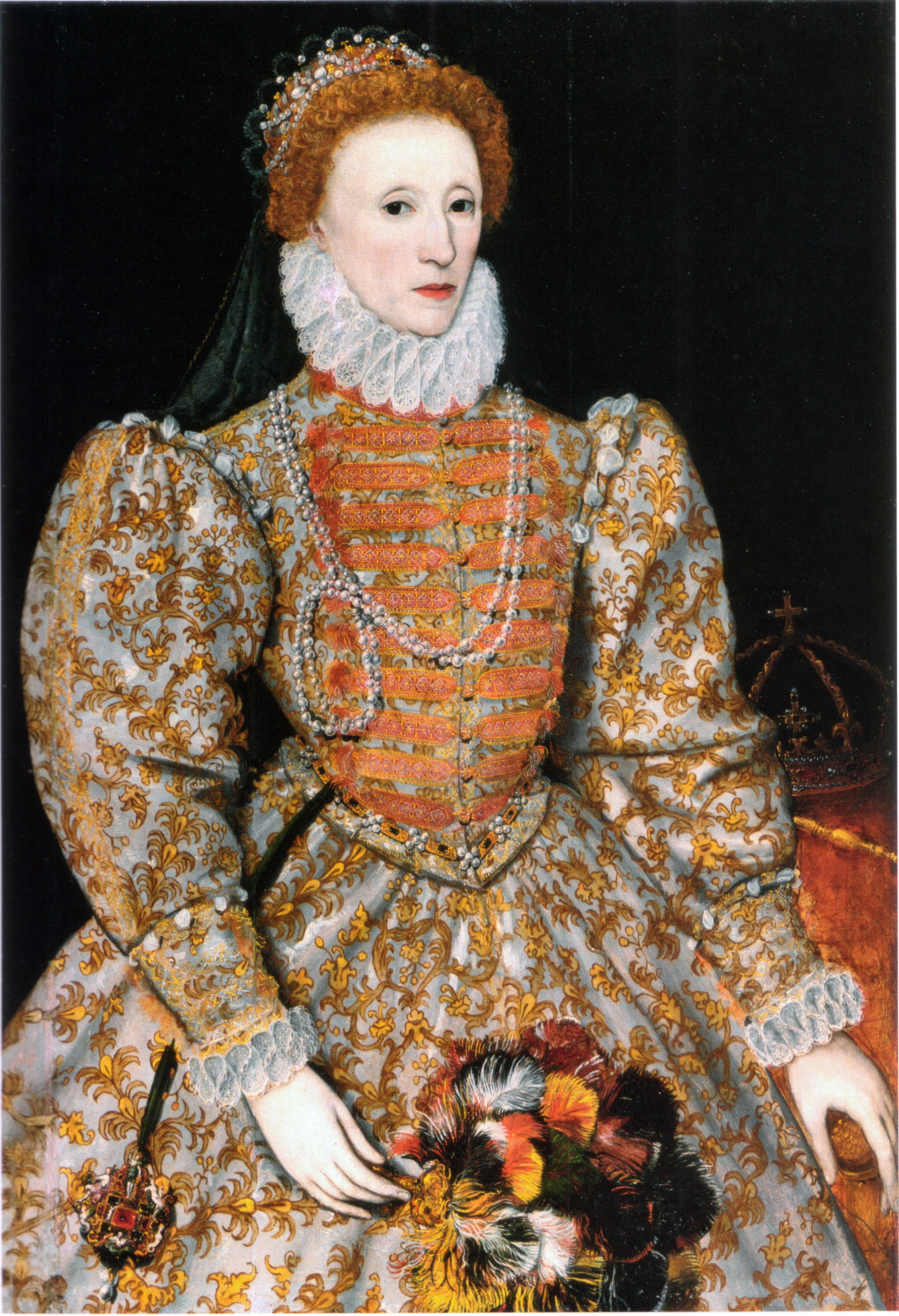
Under Queen Elizabeth I, English vagrancy laws began increasingly to provide for penal transportation as a substitute for capital sentences.

Soon, a royal commissions endorsed the notion that any felon—except those convicted of murder, witchcraft, burglary, or rape—could legally be transported to Virginia or the West Indies to work as a plantation servant. Sandys also proposed sending maids to Jamestown as "breeders," whose costs of passage could be paid for by the planters who took them on as "wives." Soon, over sixty such women had made the passage to Virginia, and more followed. King James I's royal administration also sent "vagrant" children to the New World as servants. a letter in the Virginia Company's records suggests that as many as 1,500 children were sent to Virginia between 1619 and 1627. By 1619, African prisoners were brought to Jamestown and sold as slaves as well, marking England's entry into the Atlantic slave trade.

The infusion of kidnapped children, maids, convicts, and Africans to Virginia during the early part of the seventeenth century inaugurated a pattern that would continue for nearly two centuries. By 1650, the majority of British emigrants to colonial North America went as "prisoners" of one sort or another—whether as indentured servants, convict laborers, or slaves.

The prisoner trade became the "moving force" of English colonial policy after the Restoration—i.e., from the summer of 1660 onward—according to By 1680, the Reverend Morgan Godwyn estimated that almost 10,000 persons were spirited away to the Americas annually by the English crown.

Parliament accelerated the prisoner trade in the eighteenth century. Under England's Bloody Code, a large portion of the realm's convicted criminal population faced the death penalty. But pardons were common. During the eighteenth century, the majority of those sentenced to die in English courts were pardoned—often in exchange for voluntary transport to the colonies. In 1717, Parliament empowered the English courts to directly sentence offenders to transportation, and by 1769 transportation was the leading punishment for serious crime in Great Britain. Over two-thirds of those sentenced during sessions of the Old Bailey in 1769 were transported. The list of "serious crimes" warranting transportation continued to expand throughout the eighteenth century, as it had during the seventeenth. Historian A. Roger Ekirch estimates that as many as one-quarter of all British emigrants to colonial America during the 1700s were convicts. In the 1720s, James Oglethorpe settled the colony of Georgia almost entirely with convict settlers.

The typical transported convict during the 1700s was brought to the North American colonies on board a "prison ship." Upon arrival, the convict's keepers would bathe and clothe him or her (and, in extreme cases, provide a fresh wig) in preparation for a convict auction. Newspapers advertised the arrival of a convict cargo in advance, and buyers would come at an appointed hour to purchase convicts off the auction block.

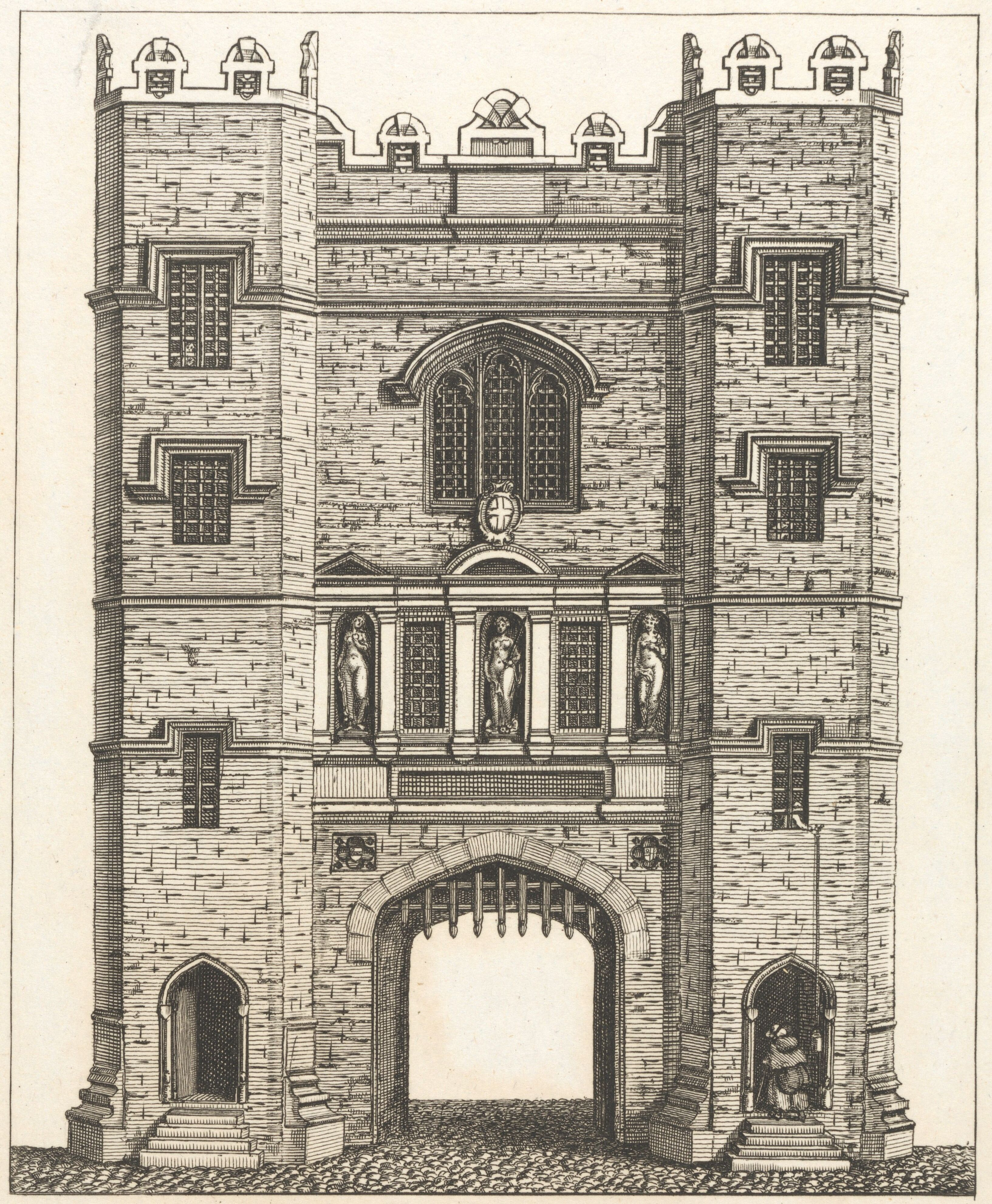
The Old Newgate Prison in London was one of many detention centers that facilitated the convict trade between England and its American colonies during the 17th and 18th centuries.

Prisons played an essential role in the convict trade. Some ancient prisons, like the Fleet and Newgate, still remained in use during the high period of the American prisoner trade in the eighteenth century. But more typically an old house, medieval dungeon space, or private structure would act as a holding pen for those bound for American plantations or the Royal Navy (under impressment). Operating clandestine prisons in major port cities for detainees whose transportation to the New World was not strictly legal, became a lucrative trade on both sides of the Atlantic in this period. Unlike contemporary prisons, those associated with the convict trade served a custodial, not a punitive function.

Many colonists in British North America resented convict transportation. As early as 1683, Pennsylvania's colonial legislature attempted to bar felons from being introduced within its borders. Benjamin Franklin called convict transportation "an insult and contempt, the cruellest, that ever one people offered to another." Franklin suggested that the colonies send some of North America's rattlesnakes to England, to be set loose in its finest parks, in revenge. But transportation of convicts to England's North American colonies continued until the American Revolution, and many officials in England saw it as a humane necessity in light of the harshness of the penal code and contemporary conditions in English jails. Dr. Samuel Johnson, upon hearing that British authorities might bow to continuing agitation in the American colonies against transportation, reportedly told James Boswell: "Why they are a race of convicts, and ought to be thankful for anything we allow them short of hanging!"

When the American Revolution ended the prisoner trade to North America, the abrupt halt threw Britain's penal system into disarray, as prisons and jails quickly filled with the many convicts who previously would have moved on to the colonies. Conditions steadily worsened. It was during this crisis period in the English criminal justice system that penal reformer John Howard began his work. Howard's comprehensive study of British penal practice, The State of the Prisons in England and Wales, was first published in 1777—one year after the start of the Revolution.

=== Colonial criminal punishments, jails, and workhouses ===
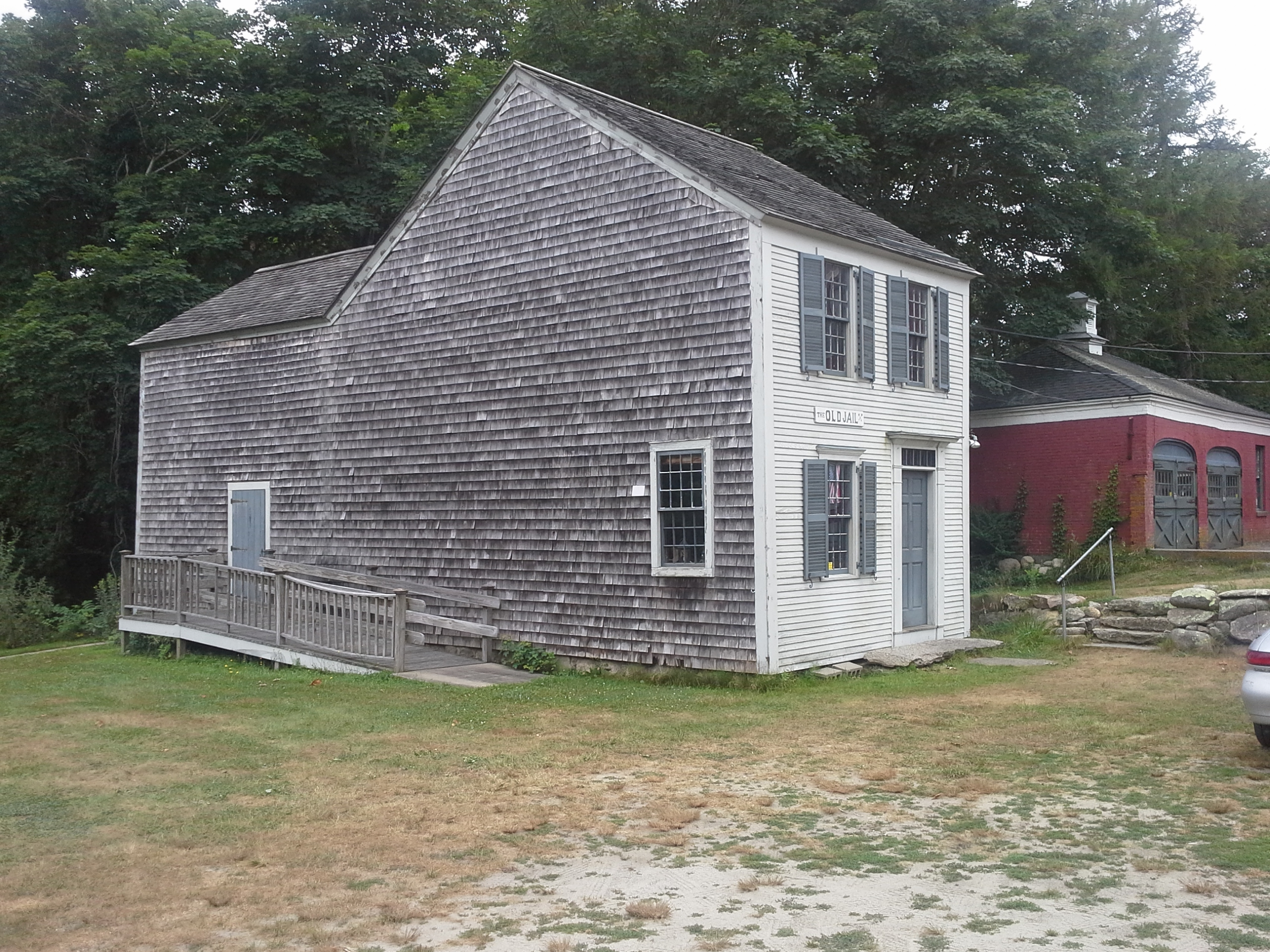
The "Old Gaol [Jail]" in Barnstable, Massachusetts, built in 1690 and operated until 1820, is today the oldest wooden jail in the United States of America.

The Old jail was built in 1690 by order of Plymouth and Massachusetts Bay Colony Courts. Used as a jail from 1690–1820; at one time moved and attached to the Constable's home. The 'Old Gaol' was added to the National Register of Historic Places in 1971.

Although jails were an early fixture of colonial North American communities, they generally did not serve as places of incarceration as a form of criminal punishment. Instead, the main role of the colonial American jail was as a non-punitive detention facility for pre-trial and pre-sentence criminal defendants, as well as imprisoned debtors. The most common penal sanctions of the day were fines, whipping, and community-oriented punishments like the stocks.

Jails were among the earliest public structures built in colonial British North America. The 1629 colonial charter of the Massachusetts Bay Colony, for example, granted the shareholders behind the venture the right to establish laws for their settlement "not contrarie to the lawes of our realm in England" and to administer "lawfull correction" to violators, and Massachusetts established a house of correction for punishing criminals by 1635. Colonial Pennsylvania built two houses of correction starting in 1682, and Connecticut established one in 1727. By the eighteenth century, every county in the North American colonies had a jail.

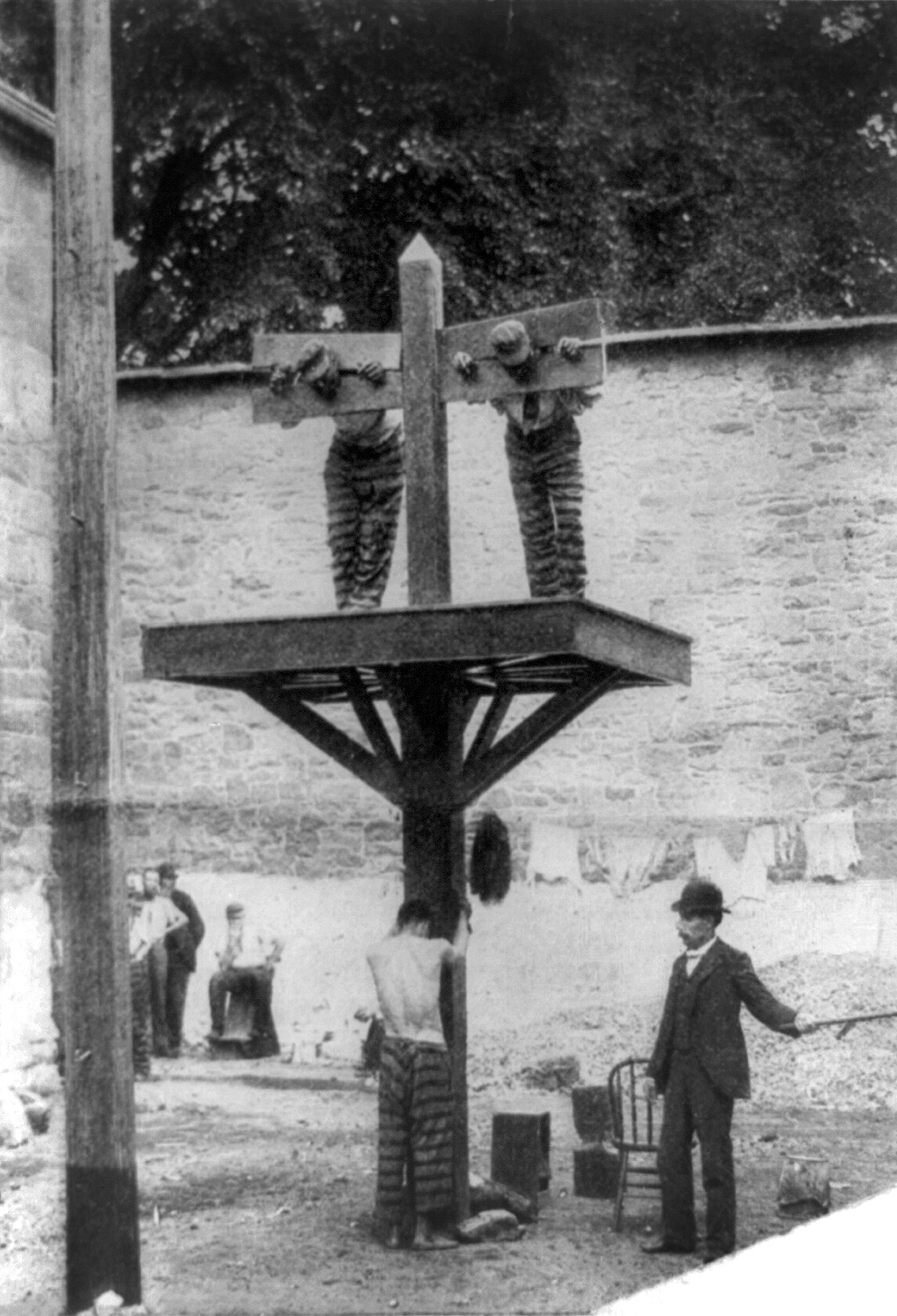
A whipping post or pillory, with stocks atop it, at the New Castle County Jail, Delaware, in 1897.

Colonial American jails were not the "ordinary mechanism of correction" for criminal offenders, according to social historian David Rothman. Criminal incarceration as a penal sanction was "plainly a second choice," either a supplement to or a substitute for traditional criminal punishments of the day, in the words of historian Adam J. Hirsch. Eighteenth-century criminal codes provided for a far wider range of criminal punishments than contemporary state and federal criminal laws in the United States. Fines, whippings, the stocks, the pillory, the public cage, banishment, capital punishment at the gallows, penal servitude in private homes—all of these punishments came before imprisonment in British colonial America.

The most common sentence of the colonial era was a fine or a whipping, but the stocks were another common punishment—so much so that most colonies, like Virginia in 1662, hastened to build these before either the courthouse or the jail. The theocratic communities of Puritan Massachusetts imposed faith-based punishments like the admonition—a formal censure, apology, and pronouncement of criminal sentence (generally reduced or suspended), performed in front of the church-going community. Sentences to the colonial American workhouse—when they were actually imposed on defendants—rarely exceeded three months, and sometimes spanned just a single day.

Colonial jails served a variety of public functions other than penal imprisonment. Civil imprisonment for debt was one of these, but colonial jails also served as warehouses for prisoners-of-war and political prisoners (especially during the American Revolution). They were also an integral part of the transportation and slavery systems—not only as warehouses for convicts and slaves being put up for auction, but also as a means of disciplining both kinds of servants.

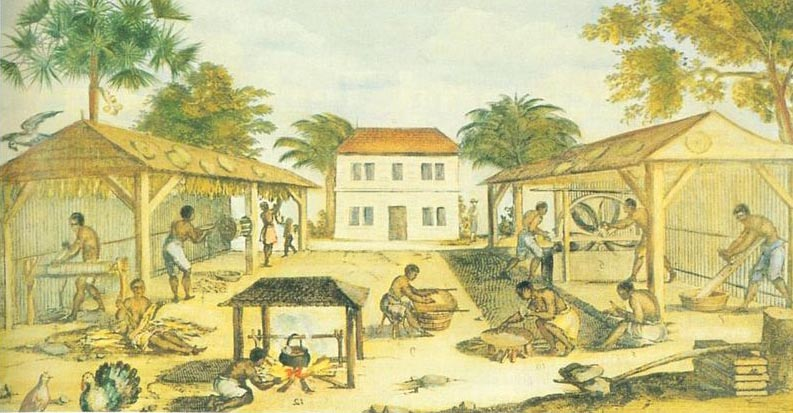
Depiction of slaves—another labor force brought to England's American colonies in captivity—processing tobacco in 17th-century Virginia.

The colonial jail's primary criminal law function was as a pre-trial and pre-sentence detention facility. Generally, only the poorest or most despised defendants found their way into the jails of colonial North America, since colonial judges rarely denied requests for bail. The only penal function of significance that colonial jails served was for contempt—but this was a coercive technique designed to protect the power of the courts, not a penal sanction in its own right.

The colonial jail differed from today's United States prisons not only in its purpose, but in its structure. Many were no more than a cage or closet. Colonial jailers ran their institutions on a "familial" model and resided in an apartment attached to the jail, sometimes with a family of their own. The colonial jail's design resembled an ordinary domestic residence, and inmates essentially rented their bed and paid the jailer for necessities.

Before the close of the American Revolution, few statutes or regulations defined the colonial jailers' duty of care or other responsibilities. Upkeep was often haphazard, and escapes quite common. Few official efforts were made to maintain inmates' health or see to their other basic needs.

=== Post-Revolutionary penal reform and the beginnings of United States prison systems ===
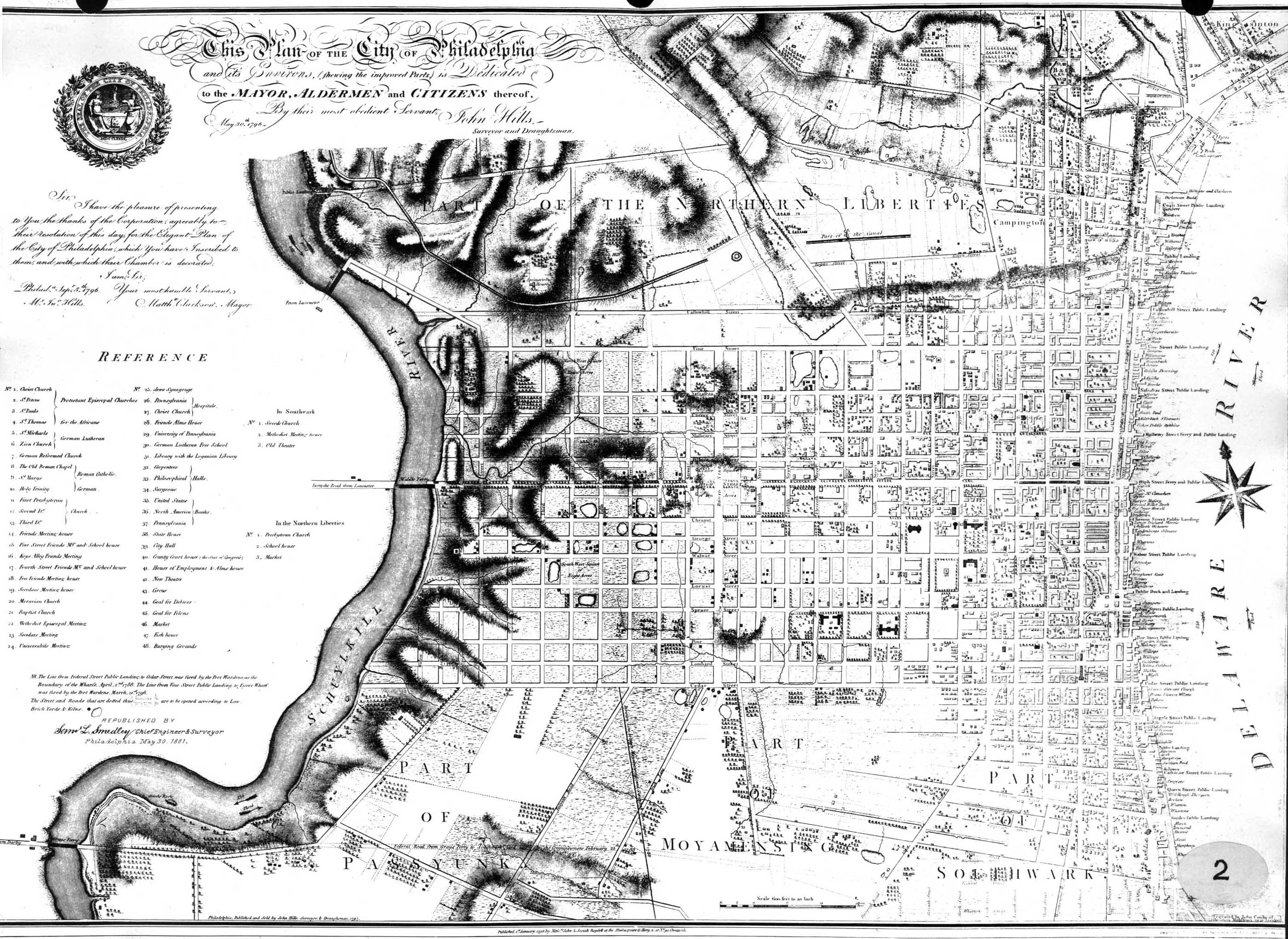
A map of Philadelphia in 1796, at a time when a century of population growth and social change was beginning to transform crime and punishment in the city and elsewhere in the early United States.

The first major prison reform movement in the United States came after the American Revolution, at the start of the nineteenth century. According to historians Adam J. Hirsch and David Rothman, the reform of this period was shaped less by intellectual movements in England than by a general clamor for action in a time of population growth and increasing social mobility, which prompted a critical reappraisal and revision of penal corrective techniques. To address these changes, post-colonial legislators and reformers began to stress the need for a system of hard labor to replace ineffectual corporal and traditional punishments. Ultimately, these early efforts yielded the United States' first penitentiary systems.

The onset of the eighteenth century brought major demographic and social change to colonial and, eventually post-colonial American life. The century was marked by rapid population growth throughout the colonies—a result of lower mortality rates and increasing (though small at first) rates of immigration. In the aftermath of the Revolutionary War, this trend persisted. Between 1790 and 1830, the population of the newly independent North American states greatly increased, and the number and density of urban centers did as well. The population of Massachusetts almost doubled in this period, while it tripled in Pennsylvania and increased five-fold in New York. In 1790, no American city had more than fifty thousand residents; however, by 1830 nearly 500,000 people lived in cities larger than that.

The population of the former British colonies also became increasingly mobile during the eighteenth century, especially after the Revolution. Movement to urban centers, in and out of emerging territories, and up and down a more fluid social ladder throughout the century made it difficult for the localism and hierarchy that had structured American life in the seventeenth century to retain their former significance. The Revolution only accelerated patterns of dislocation and transience, leaving displaced families and former soldiers struggling to adapt to the strictures of a stunted post-war economy. The emergence of cities created a kind of community very different from the pre-revolutionary model. The crowded streets of emerging urban centers like Philadelphia seemed to contemporary observers to dangerously blur class, sex, and racial boundaries.

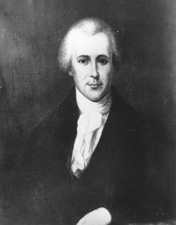
William Bradford, like other commentators of the post-revolutionary period, believed that the harsh punishments of English criminal law had perpetuated crime in the North American colonies.

Demographic change in the eighteenth century coincided with shifts in the configuration of crime. After 1700, literary evidence from a variety of sources—e.g., ministers, newspapers, and judges—suggest that property crime rates rose (or, at least, were perceived to). Conviction rates appear to have risen during the last half of the eighteenth century, rapidly so in the 1770s and afterward and especially in urban areas. Contemporary accounts also suggest widespread transiency among former criminals.

Communities began to think about their town as something less than the sum of all its inhabitants during this period, and the notion of a distinct criminal class began to materialize. In the Philadelphia of the 1780s, for example, city authorities worried about the proliferation of taverns on the outskirts of the city, "sites of an alternative, interracial, lower-class culture" that was, in the words of one observer, "the very root of vice." In Boston, a higher urban crime rate led to the creation of a specialized, urban court in 1800.

The efficacy of traditional, community-based punishments waned during the eighteenth century. Penal servitude, a mainstay of British and colonial American criminal justice, became nearly extinct during the seventeenth century, at the same time that Northern states, beginning with Vermont in 1777, began to abolish slavery. Fines and bonds for good behavior—one of the most common criminal sentences of the colonial era—were nearly impossible to enforce among the transient poor. As the former American colonists expanded their political loyalty beyond the parochial to their new state governments, promoting a broader sense of the public welfare, banishment (or "warning out") also seemed inappropriate, since it merely passed criminals onto a neighboring community. Public shaming punishments like the pillory had always been inherently unstable methods of enforcing the public order, since they depended in large part on the participation of the accused and the public. As the eighteenth century matured, and a social distance between the criminal and the community became more manifest, mutual antipathy (rather than community compassion and offender penitence) became more common at public executions and other punishments. In urban centers like Philadelphia, growing class and racial tensions—especially in the wake of the Revolution—led crowds to actively sympathize with the accused at executions and other public punishments.

Colonial governments began making efforts to reform their penal architecture and excise many traditional punishments even before the Revolution. Massachusetts, Pennsylvania, and Connecticut all inaugurated efforts to reconstitute their penal systems in the years leading up to the war to make incarceration at hard labor the sole punishment for most crimes. Although war interrupted these efforts, they were renewed afterward. A "climate change" in post-Revolutionary politics, in the words of historian Adam J. Hirsch, made colonial legislatures open to legal change of all sorts after the Revolution, as they retooled their constitutions and criminal codes to reflect their separation from England. The Anglophobic politics of the day bolstered efforts to do away with punishments inherited from English legal practice.

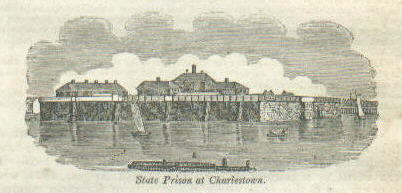
An artist's 1840 depiction of Massachusetts' Charlestown State Prison, opened in 1805 to accommodate the state's increasing prison population due to post-revolutionary penal reforms.

Reformers in the United States also began to discuss the effect of criminal punishment itself on criminality in the post-revolutionary period, and at least some concluded that the barbarism of colonial-era punishments, inherited from English penal practice, did more harm than good. "The mild voice of reason and humanity," wrote New York penal reformer Thomas Eddy in 1801, "reached not the thrones of princes or the halls of legislators." "The mother country had stifled the colonists' benevolent instincts," according to Eddy, "compelling them to emulate the crude customs of the old world. The result was the predominance of archaic and punitive laws that only served to perpetuate crime." Attorney William Bradford made an argument similar to Eddy's in a 1793 treatise.

By the second decade of the nineteenth century every state except North Carolina, South Carolina, and Florida had amended its criminal code to provide for incarceration (primarily at hard labor) as the primary punishment for all but the most serious offenses. Provincial laws in Massachusetts began to prescribe short terms in the workhouse for deterrence throughout the eighteenth century and, by mid-century, the first statutes mandating long-term hard labor in the workhouse as a penal sanction appeared. In New York, a 1785 bill, restricted in effect to New York City, authorized municipal officials to substitute up to six months' hard labor in the workhouse in all cases where prior law had mandated corporal punishment. In 1796, an additional bill expanded this program to the entire state of New York. Pennsylvania established a hard labor law in 1786. Hard-labor programs expanded to New Jersey in 1797, to Virginia in 1796, to Kentucky in 1798, and to Vermont, New Hampshire, and Maryland in 1800.

This move toward imprisonment did not translate to an immediate break from traditional forms of punishment. Many new criminal provisions merely expanded the discretion of judges to choose from among various punishments, including imprisonment. The 1785 amendments to Massachusetts' arson statute, for instance, expanded the available punishments for setting fire to a non-dwelling from whipping to hard labor, imprisonment in jail, the pillory, whipping, fining, or any or all of those punishments in combination. Massachusetts judges wielded this new-found discretion in various ways for twenty years, before fines, incarceration, or the death penalty became the sole available sanctions under the state's penal code. Other states—e.g., New York, Pennsylvania, and Connecticut—also lagged in their shift toward incarceration.

Prison construction kept pace with post-revolutionary legal change. All states that revised their criminal codes to provide for incarceration also constructed new state prisons. But the focus of penal reformers in the post-revolutionary years remained largely external to the institutions they built, according to David Rothman. For reformers of the day, Rothman claims, the fact of imprisonment—not the institution's internal routine and its effect on the offender—was of primary concern. Incarceration seemed more humane than traditional punishments like hanging and whipping, and it theoretically matched punishment more specifically to the crime. But it would take another period of reform, in the Jacksonian Era, for state prison initiatives to take the shape of actual justice institutions.

=== Jacksonian and Antebellum era ===
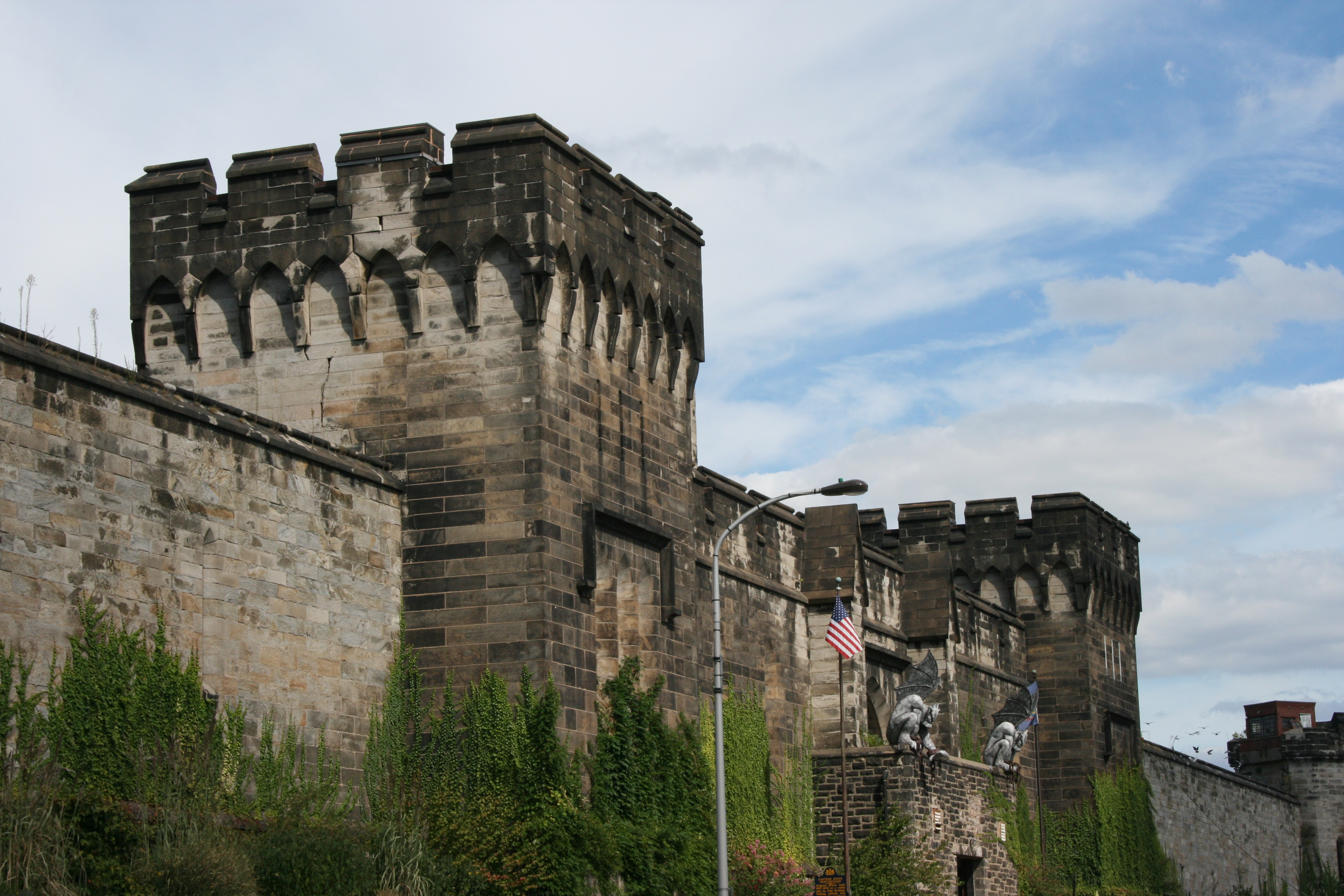
Present-day exterior shot of the gate at Eastern State Penitentiary, birthplace of the "Pennsylvania (or Separate) System" of prison governance.

By 1800, eleven of the then-sixteen United States—i.e., Pennsylvania, New York, New Jersey, Massachusetts, Kentucky, Vermont, Maryland, New Hampshire, Georgia, and Virginia—had in place some form of penal incarceration. But the primary focus of contemporary criminology remained on the legal system, according to historian David Rothman, not the institutions in which convicts served their sentences. This changed during the Jacksonian Era, as contemporary notions of criminality continued to shift.

Starting in the 1820s, a new institution, the "penitentiary", gradually became the focal point of criminal justice in the United States. At the same time, other novel institutions—the asylum and the almshouse—redefined care for the mentally ill and the poor. For its proponents, the penitentiary was an ambitious program whose external appearance, internal arrangements, and daily routine would counteract the disorder and immorality thought to be breeding crime in American society. Although its adoption was haphazard at first, and marked by political strife—especially in the South—the penitentiary became an established institution in the United States by the end of the 1830s.

==== New origins of deviancy and an institutional response ====
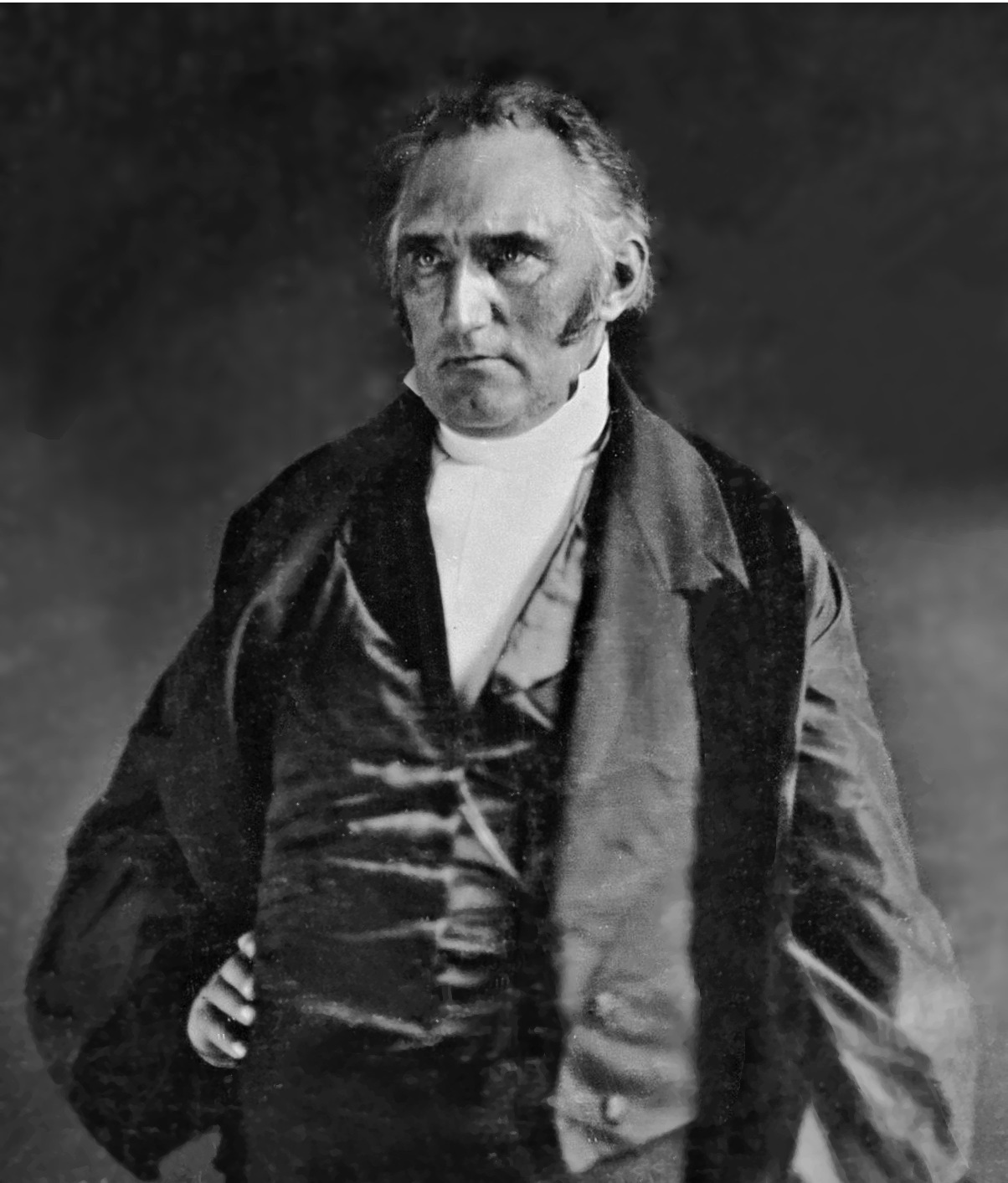
Francis Wayland, a Baptist reformer of the antebellum period, advocated for the "Auburn (or Congregate) System".

Jacksonian-era reformers and prison officials began seeking the origins of crime in the personal histories of criminals and traced the roots of crime to society itself. In the words of historian David Rothman, "They were certain that children lacking discipline quickly fell victim to the influence of vice at loose in the community." Jacksonian reformers specifically tied rapid population growth and social mobility to the disorder and immorality of contemporary society. Alongside the movement for reform was for prisons to justify the safety to the public.

To combat society's decay and the risks presented by it, Jacksonian penologists designed an institutional setting to remove "deviants" from the corruption of their families and communities. In this corruption-free environment, the deviant could learn the vital moral lessons he or she had previously ignored while sheltered from the temptations of vice. This solution ultimately took the shape of the penitentiary.

In the 1820s, New York and Pennsylvania began new prison initiatives that inspired similar efforts in a number of other states. Post-revolutionary carceral regimes had conformed to the English workhouse tradition; inmates labored together by day and shared congregate quarters at night.

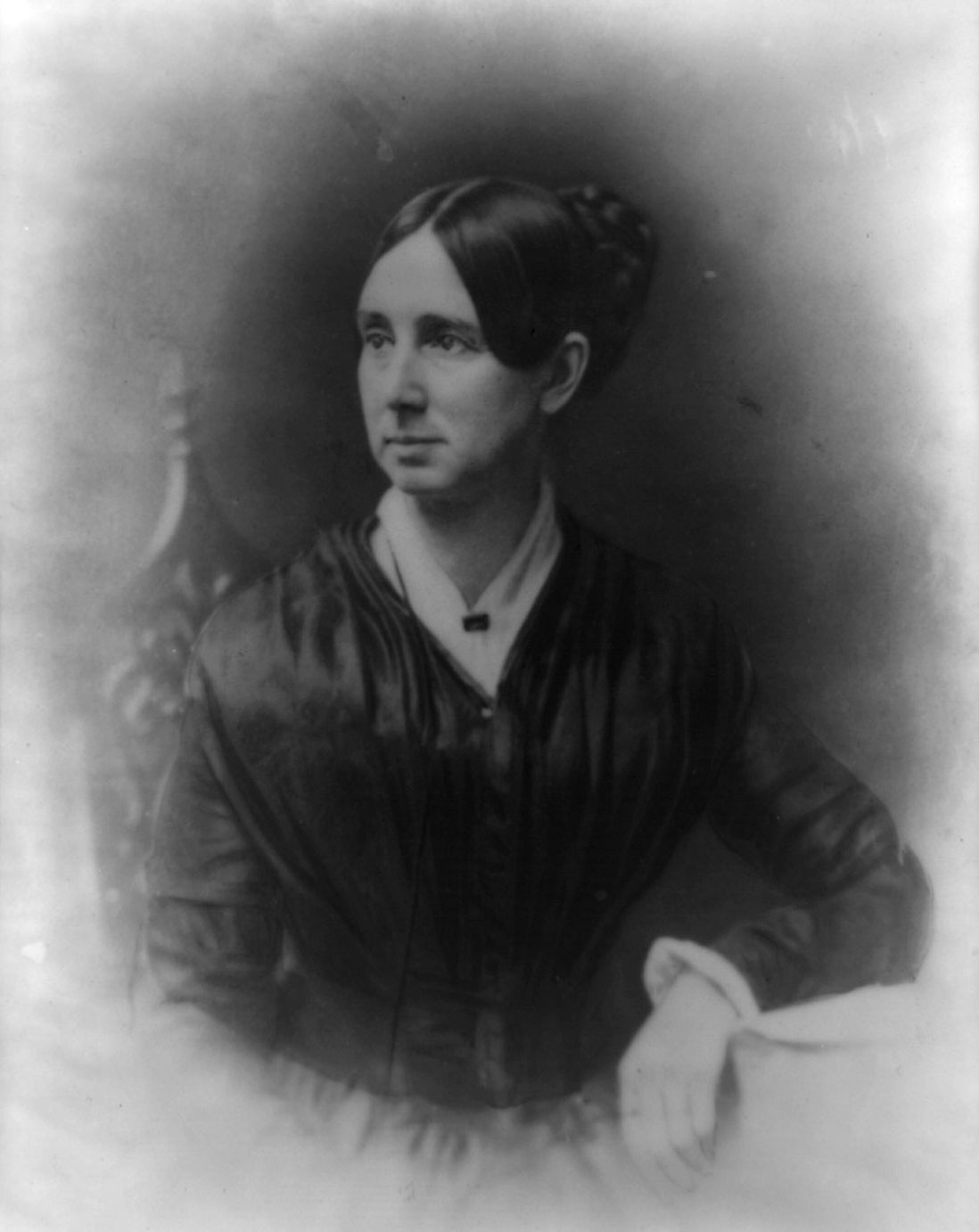
Antebellum reformer Dorothea Dix supported the "Pennsylvania (or Separate) System".

Beginning in 1790, Pennsylvania became the first of the United States to institute solitary confinement for incarcerated convicts. After 1790, those sentenced to hard labor in Pennsylvania were moved indoors to an inner block of solitary cells in Philadelphia's Walnut Street Jail. New York began implementing solitary living quarters at New York City's Newgate Prison in 1796.

From the efforts at the Walnut Street Jail and Newgate Prison, two competing systems of imprisonment emerged in the United States by the 1820s. The "Auburn" (or "Congregate System") emerged from New York's prison of the same name between 1819 and 1823. And the "Pennsylvania" (or "Separate System") emerged in that state between 1826 and 1829. The only material difference between the two systems was whether inmates would ever leave their solitary cells—under the Pennsylvania System, inmates almost never did, but under the Auburn System most inmates labored in congregate workshops by day and slept alone.

To advocates of both systems, the promise of institutionalization depended upon isolating the prisoner from the moral contamination of society and establishing discipline in him (or, in rarer cases, her). But the debate as to which system was superior continued into the mid-nineteenth century, pitting some of the period's most prominent reformers against one another. Samuel Gridley Howe promoted the Pennsylvania System in opposition to Mathew Carey, an Auburn proponent; Dorothea Dix took up the Pennsylvania System against Louis Dwight; and Francis Lieber supported Pennsylvania against Francis Wayland. The Auburn system eventually prevailed, however, due largely to its lesser cost.

==== The Pennsylvania system ====
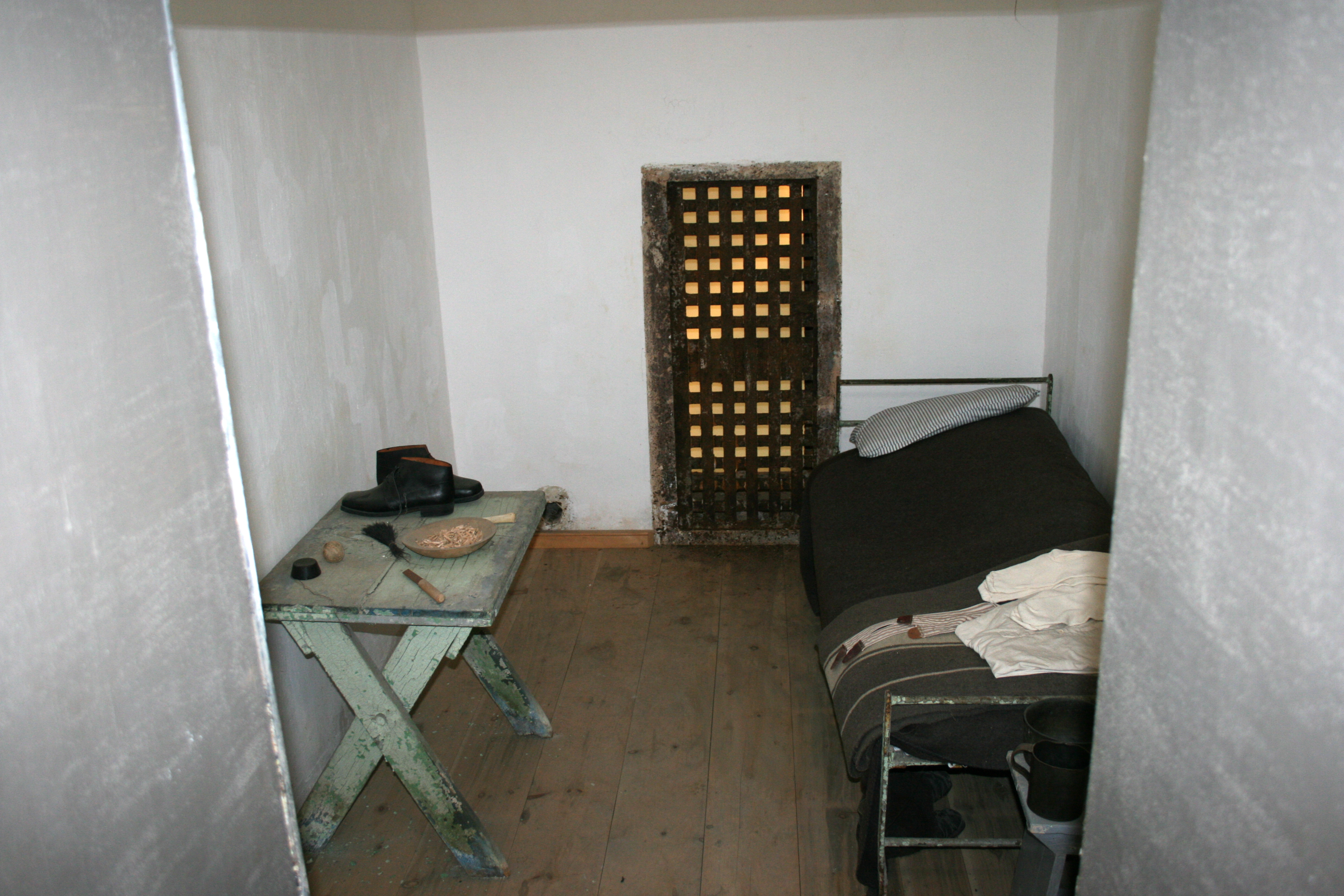
Present-day photograph of a typical cell at the Eastern State Penitentiary, where the "Pennsylvania (or Separate) System" was first practiced, in restored condition.

The Pennsylvania system, first implemented in the early 1830s at that state's Eastern State Penitentiary outskirts of Philadelphia and Western State Penitentiary at Pittsburgh, was designed to maintain the complete separation of inmates at all times. Until 1904, prisoners entered the institution with a black hood over their head, so they would never know who their fellow convicts were, before being led to the cell where they would serve the remainder of their sentence in near-constant solitude. The Cherry Hill complex entailed a massive expenditure of state funds; its walls alone cost $200,000, and its final price tag reached $750,000, one of the largest state expenditures of its day.

Like its competitor Auburn system, Eastern State's regimen was premised on the inmate's potential for individual rehabilitation. Solitude, not labor, was its hallmark; labor was reserved only for those inmates who affirmatively earned the privilege. All contact with the outside world more or less ceased for Eastern State prisoners. Proponents boasted that a Pennsylvania inmate was "perfectly secluded from the world ... hopelessly separated from ... family, and from all communication with and knowledge of them for the whole term of imprisonment."

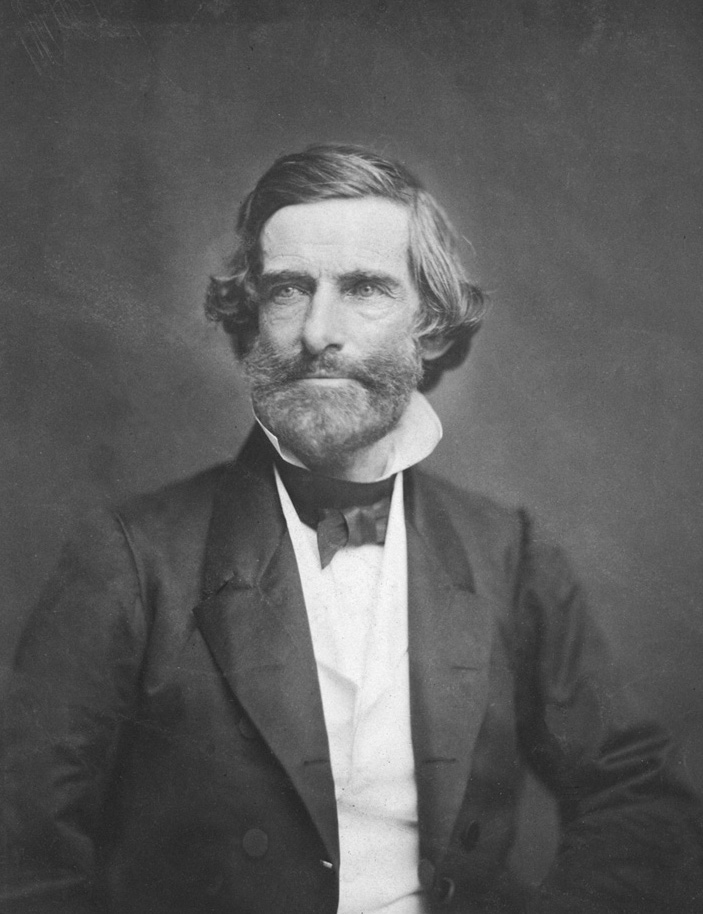
Samuel Gridley Howe, antebellum American reformer and advocate for the "Pennsylvania (or Separate) System" of prison governance.

Through isolation and silence—complete separation from the moral contaminants of the outside worlds—Pennsylvania supporters surmised that inmates would begin a reformation. "Each individual," a representative tract reads, "will necessarily be made the instrument of his own punishment; his conscience will be the avenger of society."

Proponents insisted that the Pennsylvania system would involve only mild disciplinary measures, reasoning that isolated men would have neither the resources nor the occasion to violate rules or to escape. But from the outset Eastern State's keepers used corporal punishments to enforce order. Officials used the "iron gag," a bridle-like metal bit placed in the inmate's mouth and chained around his neck and head; the "shower bath," repeated dumping of cold water onto a restrained convict; or the "mad chair," into which inmates were strapped in such a way so as to prevent their bodies from resting.

Ultimately, only three prisons ever enacted the costly Pennsylvania program. But nearly all penal reformers of the antebellum period believed in Pennsylvania's use of solitary confinement. The system remained largely intact at Eastern State Penitentiary into the early twentieth century.

==== New York, the Auburn system, and the future of the penitentiary ====
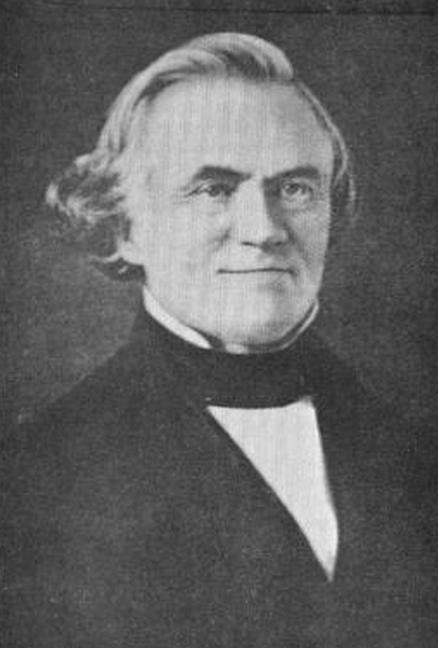
Elam Lynds, the first warden of the Auburn Penitentiary, is credited with creating the "Auburn (or Congregate) System."

The Auburn or "Congregate" System became the archetypical model penitentiary in the 1830s and 1840s, as its use expanded from New York's Auburn Penitentiary into the Northeast, the Midwest, and the South. The Auburn system's combination of congregate labor in prison workshops and solitary confinement by night became a near-universal ideal in United States prison systems, if not an actual reality.

Under the Auburn system, prisoners slept alone at night and labored together in a congregate workshop during the day for the entirety of their fixed criminal sentence as set by a judge. Prisoners at Auburn were not to converse at any time, or even to exchange glances. Guards patrolled secret passageways behind the walls of the prison's workshops in moccasins, so inmates could never be sure whether or not they were under surveillance.

One official described Auburn's discipline as "tak[ing] measures for convincing the felon that he is no longer his own master; no longer in a condition to practice deceptions in idleness; that he must learn and practice diligently some useful trade, whereby, when he is let out of the prison to obtain an honest living." Inmates were permitted no intelligence of events on the outside. In the words of an early warden, Auburn inmates were "to be literally buried from the world." The institution's regime remained largely intact until after the Civil War.

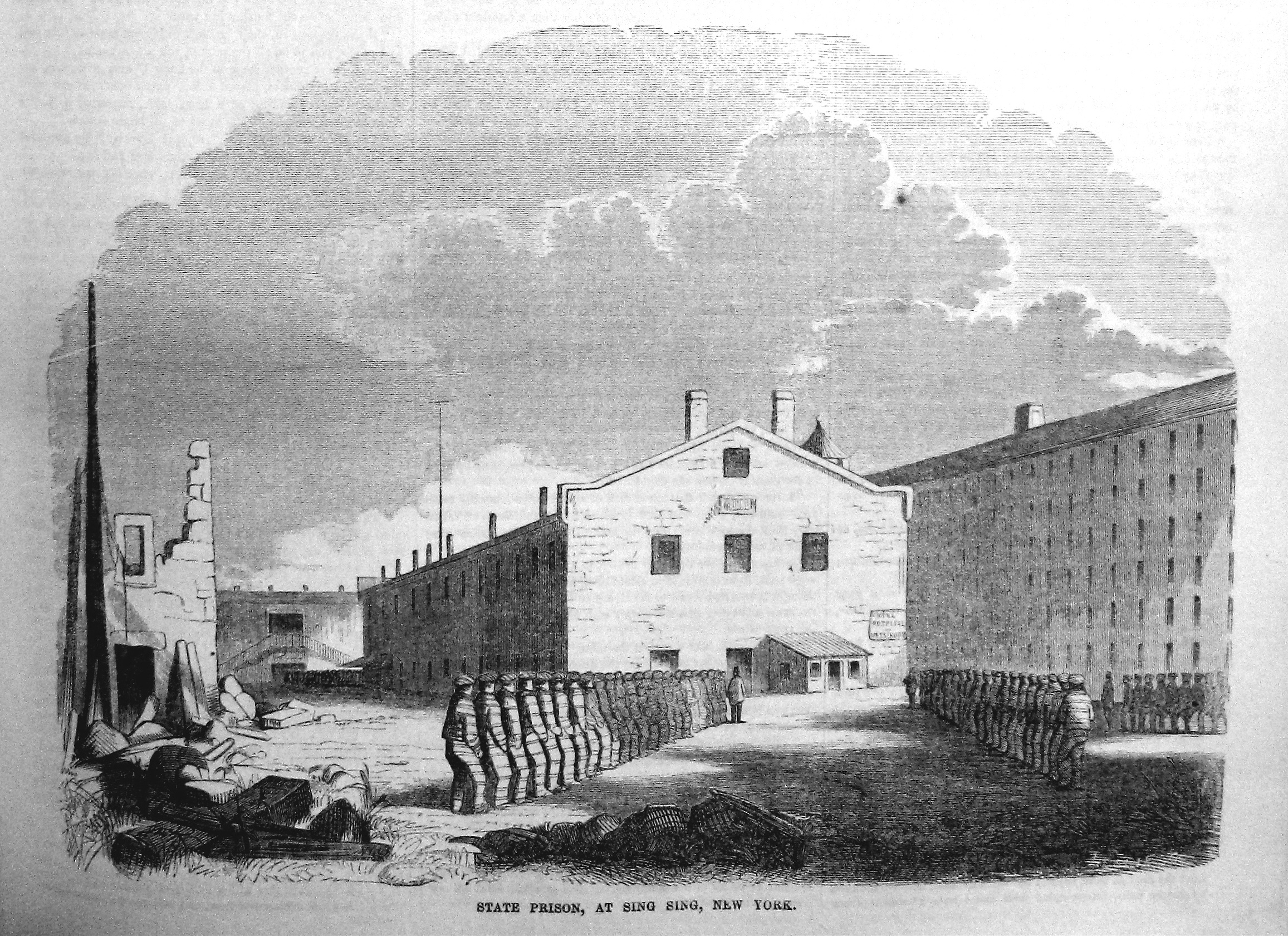
An 1855 engraving of New York's Sing Sing Penitentiary, which also followed the "Auburn (or Congregate) System."

Auburn was the second state prison built in New York State. The first, Newgate, located in present-day Greenwich Village in New York City, contained no solitary cells beyond a few set aside for "worst offenders." Its first keeper, Quaker Thomas Eddy, believed rehabilitation of the criminal was the primary end of punishment (though Eddy also believed that his charges were "wicked and depraved, capable of every atrocity, and ever plotting some means of violence and escape.") Eddy was not inclined to rely on prisoners' fear of his severity; his "chief disciplinary weapon" was solitary confinement on limited rations, he forbade his guards from striking inmates, and permitted "well-behaved" inmates to have a supervised visit with family once every three months. Eddy made largely unsuccessful efforts to establish profitable prison labor programs, which he had hoped would cover incarceration costs and provide seed money for inmates' re-entry into society in the form of the "overstint"—i.e., a small portion of the profits of an inmate's labor while incarcerated, payable at his or her release. Discipline nevertheless remained hard to enforce, and major riots occurred in 1799 and 1800—the latter only subdued via military intervention. Conditions continued to worsen in the wake of the riots, especially during a crime wave that followed the War of 1812.

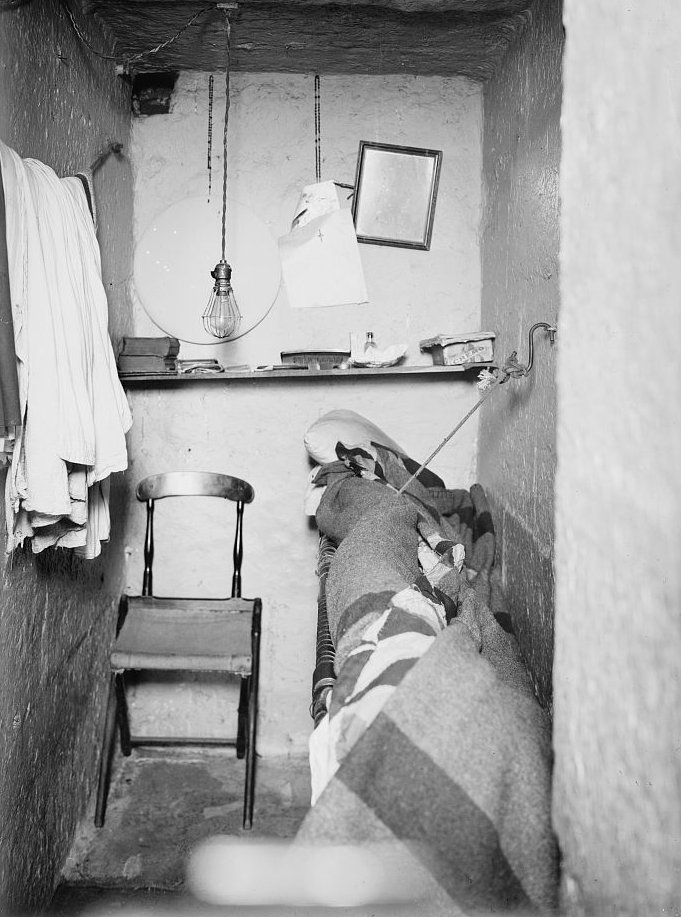
Present-day photograph of a cell in the older facility at Sing Sing Penitentiary.

New York legislators set aside funds for construction of the Auburn prison to address the disappointments of Newgate and alleviate its persistent overcrowding. Almost from the outset, Auburn officials, with the consent of the legislature, eschewed the "humane" style envisioned by Thomas Eddy for Newgate. Floggings of up to thirty-nine lashes in duration as punishment for disciplinary infractions were permitted under an 1819 state law, which also authorized the use of the stocks and the irons. The practice of providing convicts with some of the proceeds of their labor at the time of release, the "overstint," was discontinued. The severity of the new regime likely caused another series of riots in 1820, after which the legislature formed a New York State Prison Guard for putting down future disturbances.

Officials also began implementing a classification system at Auburn in the wake of the riots, dividing inmates into three groups: (1) the worst, who were placed on constant solitary lockdown; (2) middling offenders, who were kept in solitary and worked in groups when well-behaved; and (3) the "least guilty and depraved," who were permitted to sleep in solitary and work in groups. Construction on a new solitary cell block for category (1) inmates ended in December 1821, after which these "hardened" offenders moved into their new home. Within a little over a year, however, five of these men had died of consumption, another forty-one were seriously ill, and several had gone insane. After visiting the prison and seeing the residents of the new cell block, Governor Joseph C. Yates was so appalled by their condition that he pardoned several of them outright.

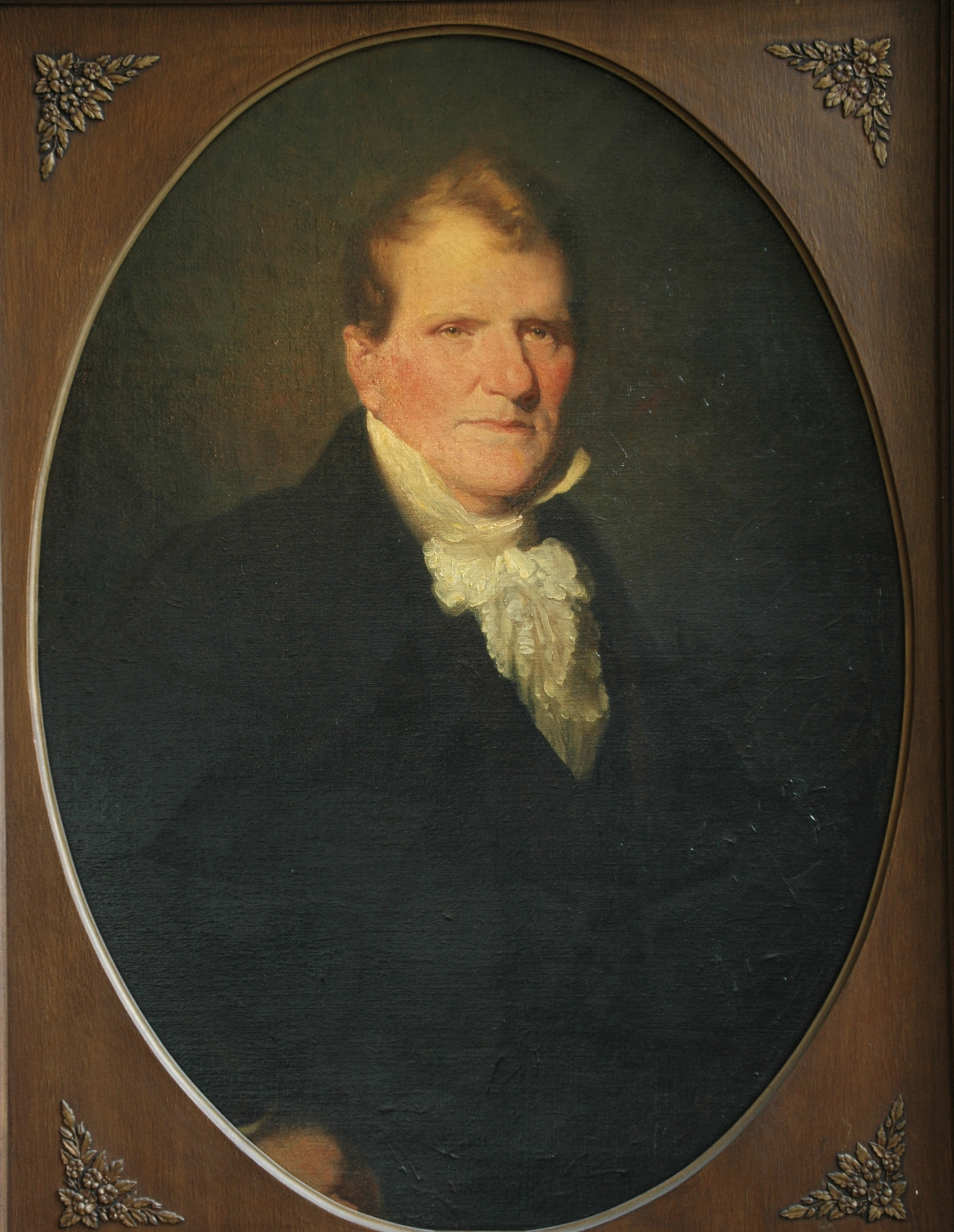
When Joseph C. Yates visited solitary cells at the Auburn Penitentiary in the early 1820s, he pardoned several inmates on the spot to spare them further confinement at the prison.

Scandal struck Auburn again when a female inmate became pregnant in solitary confinement and, later, died after repeated beatings and the onset of pneumonia. (Because Auburn relied on female inmates for its washing and cleaning services, women remained part of the population but the first separate women's institution in New York was not completed until 1893.) A jury convicted the keeper who beat the woman of assault and battery, and fined him $25, but he remained on the job. A grand jury investigation into other aspects of the prison's management followed but was hampered, among other obstacles, by the fact that convicts could not present evidence in court. Even so, the grand jury eventually concluded that Auburn's keepers had been permitted to flog inmates without a higher official present, a violation of state law. But neither the warden nor any other officer was ever prosecuted, and the use and intensity of flogging only increased at Auburn, as well as the newer Sing Sing prison, in subsequent years.

Despite its early scandals and regular political power struggles that left it with an unstable administrative structure, Auburn remained a model institution nationwide for decades to come. Massachusetts opened a new prison in 1826 modeled on the Auburn system, and within the first decade of Auburn's existence, New Hampshire, Vermont, Maryland, Kentucky, Ohio, Tennessee, and the District of Columbia all constructed prisons patterned on its congregate system. By the eve of the American Civil War, Illinois, Indiana, Georgia, Missouri, Mississippi, Texas, and Arkansas, with varying success, had all inaugurated efforts to establish an Auburn-model prison in their jurisdictions.

The widespread move to penitentiaries in the antebellum United States changed the geography of criminal punishment, as well as its central therapy. Offenders were now ferried across water or into walled compounds to centralized institutions of the criminal justice system hidden from public view. The penitentiary thus largely ended community involvement in the penal process—beyond a limited role in the criminal trial itself—though many prisons permitted visitors who paid a fee to view the inmates throughout the nineteenth century.

==== The South ====
On eve of American Civil War, crime did not pose a major concern in the Southern United States. Southerners in the main considered crime to be a Northern problem. A traditional extra-legal system of remedying slights, based in honor culture made personal violence the hallmark of Southern crime. Southern penitentiary systems brought only the most hardened criminals under centralized state control. Most criminals remained outside of formal state control structures—especially outside of Southern cities.

===== Antebellum Southern republicanism and political opposition to penitentiary building =====
The historical record suggests that, in contrast to Northerners, Southern states experienced a unique political anxiety about whether to construct prisons during the antebellum period. Disagreements over republican principles—i.e., the role of the state in social governance—became the focus of a persistent debate about the necessity of southern penitentiaries in the decades between independence and the Civil War.

To many Southerners, writes historian Edward L. Ayers, "republicanism" translated simply to freedom from the will of anyone else: Centralized power, even in the name of an activist republican government, promised more evil than good. Ayers concludes that this form of Southern republicanism owed its particular shape to slavery. The South's slave economy perpetuated a rural, localized culture, he argues, in which men distrusted strangers' claims to power. In this political milieu, the notion of surrendering individual liberties of any kind—even those of criminals—for some abstract conception of "social improvement" was abhorrent to many.

But criminal incarceration appealed to others in the South. These Southerners believed that freedom would best grow under the protection of an enlightened state government that made the criminal law more effective by eradicating its more brutal practices and offering criminals the possibility of rehabilitation and restoration to society. Some also believed that penitentiaries would help to remove the contagion of depravity from republican society by segregating those who threatened the republican ideal (the "disturbing class"). Notions of living up to the world's ideas of "progress" also animated Southern penal reformers. When the Georgia legislature considered abolishing the state's penitentiary after a devastating fire in 1829, reformers there worried their state would become the first to renounce republican "progress."

A sizable portion of the Southern population—if not the majority—did not support the establishment of the penitentiary. Of the two times that voters in the region had an opportunity to express their opinion of the penitentiary system at the ballot box—in Alabama and North Carolina—the penitentiary lost overwhelmingly. Some viewed traditional public punishments as the most republican mechanism for criminal justice, due to their inherent transparency. Some worried that, since the quantity of suffering under penitentiary system would sure to far exceed that of the traditional system, Southern jurors would maintain their historic disposal toward acquittal. Evangelical Southern clergymen also opposed the penitentiary—especially when its implementation accompanied statutory restriction of the death penalty, which they deemed a biblical requirement for certain crimes.

Opposition to the penitentiary crossed party lines; neither the Whigs nor the Democrats lent consistent support to the institution in the antebellum period. But consistent and enthusiastic support for the penitentiary did come, almost uniformly, from Southern governors. The motives of these governors are not entirely unclear, historian Edward L. Ayers concludes: Perhaps they hoped that the additional patronage positions offered by a penitentiary would augment the historically weak power of the Southern executive; perhaps they were legitimately concerned with the problem of crime; or perhaps both considerations played a role. Grand juries—drawn from Southern "elites"—also issued regular calls for penitentiaries in this period.

Ultimately, the penitentiary's supporters prevailed in the South, as in the North. Southern legislators enacted prison legislation in state after Southern state before the Civil War, often over public opposition. Their motives in doing so appear mixed. According to Edward L. Ayers, some Southern legislators appear to have believed they knew what was best for their people in any case. Since many Southern legislators came from the elite classes, Ayers also observes, they may also have had a personal "class control" motive for enacting penitentiary legislation, even while they could point to their participation in penitentiary efforts as evidence of their own benevolence. Historian Michael S. Hindus concludes that Southern hesitation about the penitentiary, at least in South Carolina, stemmed from the slave system, which made the creation of a white criminal underclass undesirable.

===== Prison construction =====
Southern states erected penitentiaries alongside their Northern counterparts in the early nineteenth century. Virginia (1796), Maryland (1829), Tennessee (1831), Georgia (1832), Louisiana and Missouri (1834–1837), and Mississippi and Alabama (1837–1842) all erected penitentiary facilities during the antebellum period. Only the North Carolina, South Carolina and largely uninhabited Florida failed to build any penitentiary before the Civil War

Virginia was the first state after Pennsylvania, in 1796, to dramatically reduce the number of crimes punishable by death, and its legislators simultaneously called for the construction of a "gaol and penitentiary house" as the cornerstone of a new criminal justice regime. Designed by Benjamin Henry Latrobe, the state's first prison at Richmond resembled Jeremy Bentham's Panopticon design (as well as the not-yet-built Eastern State Penitentiary's). All inmates served a mandatory period of solitary confinement after initial entry.

Unfortunately for its inhabitants, the site at Richmond where Virginia's first penitentiary was built bordered a stagnant pool, in which sewage collected. The prison's cells had no heating system and water oozed from its walls, leading inmates' extremities to freeze during the winter months. Prisoners could perform no work during the solitary portion of their sentence, which they served completely isolated in near-total darkness, and many went mad during this portion of their sentence. Those prisoners who survived the isolation period joined other inmates in the prison workshop to make goods for the state militia. The workshop never turned a profit. Escapes were common.

But despite Virginia's example, Kentucky, Maryland, and Georgia all constructed prisons before 1820, and the trend continued in the South thereafter. Early Southern prisons were marked by escapes, violence, and arson. The personal reformation of inmates was left almost solely to underpaid prison chaplains. Bitter opposition from the public and rampant overcrowding both marked Southern penal systems during the antebellum period. But once established, southern penitentiaries took on lives of their own, with each state's system experiencing a complex history of innovation and stagnation, efficient and inefficient wardens, relative prosperity and poverty, fires, escapes, and legislative attacks; but they did follow a common trajectory.

During the period in which slavery existed, few black Southerners in the lower South were imprisoned, and virtually none of those imprisoned were slaves. Most often, slaves accused of crimes—especially less serious offenses—were tried informally in extra-legal plantation "courts," although it was not uncommon for slaves to come within the formal jurisdiction of the Southern courts. The majority of Southern inmates during the antebellum period were foreign-born whites. Nevertheless, in the upper South, free blacks made up a significant (and disproportionate) one-third of state prison populations. Governors and legislators in both the upper and lower South became concerned about racial mixing in their prison systems. Virginia experimented for a time with selling free blacks convicted of "serious" crimes into slavery until public opposition led to the measure's repeal (but only after forty such persons were sold).

Very few women, black or white, were imprisoned in the antebellum South. But for those women who did come under the control of Southern prisons, conditions were often "horrendous," according to Edward L. Ayers. Although they were not made to shave their heads like male convicts, female inmates in the antebellum South did not live in specialized facilities—as was the case in many antebellum Northern prisons—and sexual abuse was common.

As in the North, the costs of imprisonment preoccupied Southern authorities, although it appears that Southerners devoted more concern to this problem than their Northern counterparts. Southern governors of the antebellum period tended to have little patience for prisons that did not turn a profit or, at least, break even. Southern prisons adopted many of the same money-making tactics as their Northern counterparts. Prisons earned money by charging fees to visitors. They also earned money by harnessing convict labor to produce simple goods that were in steady demand, like slave shoes, wagons, pails, and bricks. But this fomented unrest among workers and tradesmen in Southern towns and cities. Governor Andrew Johnson of Tennessee, a former tailor, waged political war on his state's penitentiary and the industries it had introduced among its inmates. To avoid these conflicts, some states—like Georgia and Mississippi—experimented with prison industry for state-run enterprises. But in the end few penitentiaries, North or South, turned a profit during the antebellum period.

Presaging Reconstruction-era developments, however, Virginia, Georgia, and Tennessee began considering the idea of leasing their convicts to private businesspersons by the 1850s. Prisoners in Missouri, Alabama, Texas, Kentucky, and Louisiana all leased their convicts during the antebellum period under a variety of arrangements—some inside the prison itself (as Northern prisons were also doing), and others outside of the state's own facilities.

===== Urban crime in the antebellum South =====
Between 1800 and 1860, the vast majority of the Southern population worked in agriculture. Whereas the proportion of the Northern population working on farms dropped in this period from 70 to 40 percent, 80 percent of Southerners were consistently engaged in farm-related work. Reflecting this, only one-tenth of Southerners lived in what the contemporary census criteria described as an urban area (compared to nearly one-quarter of Northerners).

Antebellum southern cities stood at the juncture of the region's slave economy and the international market economy, and economics appear to have played a crucial role in shaping the face of crime in Southern cities. These urban centers tended to attract young and propertyless white males, not only from the Southern countryside, but also from the North and abroad. Urban immigration in the South reached a peak during the 1850s, when an economic boom in cotton produced "flush times." Poor young men and others—white and black—settled on the peripheries of Southern cities like Savannah, Georgia. Here they came into contact with the wealthy and more stable elements of modern society, producing demographics similar to those in post-revolutionary Philadelphia and other Northern cities.

The first modern Southern police forces emerged between 1845 and the Civil War in large part due to the class-based tensions that developed in Southern cities. Some Southern cities—notably New Orleans and Charleston—experimented with police forces even earlier in the eighteenth century as a means of controlling their large urban slave populations. But most Southern cities relied on volunteer night-watch forces prior to mid-century. The transition to uniformed police forces was not especially smooth: Major political opposition arose as a result of the perceived corruption, inefficiency, and threat to individual liberty posed by the new police.

According to Edward L. Ayers, Southern police forces of the antebellum period tended to enforce uniformity by creating crime out of "disorder" and "nuisance" enforcement. The vast majority of theft prosecutions in the antebellum South arose in its cities. And property offenders made up a disproportionate share of the convict population. Although thieves and burglars constituted fewer than 20 percent of the criminals convicted in Southern courts, they made up about half the South's prison population.

During the period between independence and the Civil War, Southern inmates were disproportionately ethnic. Foreign-born persons made up less than 3 percent of the South's free population. In fact, only one-eighth of all immigrants to the United States during the antebellum period settled in the South. Yet foreign immigrants represented anywhere from 8 to 37 percent of the prison population of the Southern states during this period.

Crime in Southern cities generally mirrored that of Northern ones during the antebellum years. Both sections experienced a spike in imprisonment rates during a national market depression on the eve of the American Civil War. The North had experienced a similar depression during the 1830s and 1840s—with a concurrent increase in imprisonment—that the agrarian South did not. But urban crime in the South differed from that in the North in one key way—its violence. A significantly higher percentage of violence characterized Southern criminal offenders of all class levels. Young white males made up the bulk of violent offenders in the urban South.

Slavery in the urban South also played a role in the development of its penal institutions. Urban slave-owners often utilized jails to "store" their human property and to punish slaves for disciplinary infractions. Slaveholding in urban areas tended to be less rigid than in the rural South. Nearly 60 percent of slaves living in Savannah, Georgia, for example, did not reside with their master; many were allowed to hire themselves out for wages (though they had to share the proceeds with their owner). In this environment, where racial control was more difficult to enforce, Southern whites were constantly on guard against black criminality. Charleston, South Carolina, established a specialized workhouse for masters to send their slaves for punishment for a fee. In Savannah, Georgia, owners could send their slaves to the city jail to have punishment administered.

===== Rural crime in the antebellum South =====
Industrialization proceeded haphazardly across the South during the antebellum period, and large sections of the rural population participated in a subsistence economy like that of the colonial era. Patterns of crime in these regions reflected these economic realities; violence, not thefts, took up most of the docket space in rural Southern courts.

Unlike antebellum urban spaces, the ups and downs of the market economy had a lesser impact on crime in the South's rural areas. Far fewer theft cases appear on criminal dockets in the rural antebellum South than in its cities (though rural judges and juries, like their urban counterparts, dealt with property offenders more harshly than violent ones). Crime in rural areas consisted almost solely of violent offenses.

Most counties in the antebellum South—as in the North—maintained a jail for housing pre-trial and pre-sentence detainees. These varied in size and quality of construction considerably as a result of disparities in wealth between various counties. Unlike Southern cities, however, rural counties rarely used the jail as criminal punishment in the antebellum period, even as states across the Northeast and the Midwest shifted the focus of their criminal justice process to rehabilitative incarceration. Instead, fines were the mainstay of rural Southern justice.

The non-use of imprisonment as a criminal punishment in the rural antebellum South reflected the haphazard administration of criminal justice in these regions. Under the general criminal procedure of the day, victims of theft or violence swore out complaints before their local justice of the peace, who in turn issued arrest warrants for the accused. The county sheriff would execute the warrant and bring the defendant before a magistrate judge, who would conduct a preliminary hearing, after which he could either dismiss the case or bind the accused over to the Superior Court for a grand jury hearing. (Some cases, however, particularly those involving moral offenses like drinking and gambling, were initiated by the grand jury of its own accord.)

Criminal procedure in the antebellum rural South offered many avenues of escape to a criminal defendant, and only the poorest resided in the jail while awaiting trial or sentencing. Those defendants who did spend time in jail before trial had to wait for the prosecutor's biannual visit to their county. Southern prosecutors generally did not live in the local area where they prosecuted cases and were generally ill-prepared. Disinterested jurors were also hard to come by, given the generally intimate nature of rural Southern communities. Relative leniency in sentencing for appears to have marked most judicial proceedings for violent offenses—the most common. Historical evidence suggests that juries indicted a greater number of potential offenders than the judicial system could handle in the belief that many troublemakers—especially the landless—would leave the country altogether.

Few immigrants or free blacks lived in the rural South in the pre-Civil War years, and slaves remained under the dominant control of a separate criminal justice system administered by planters throughout the period. Thus, most criminal defendants were Southern-born whites (and all socio-economic classes were represented on criminal dockets). Blacks occasionally came within the purview of the conventional criminal justice apparatus from their dealings with whites in the "gray market," among other offenses. But the danger to whites and blacks alike from illicit trading, the violence that often erupted at their meetings, and the tendency of whites to take advantage of their legally impotent black counterparties all made these occurrences relatively rare.

=== Reconstruction era ===
The American Civil War and its aftermath witnessed renewed efforts to reform America's system and rationale for imprisonment. Most state prisons remained unchanged since the wave of penitentiary building during the Jacksonian Era and, as a result, were in a state of physical and administrative deterioration. Auburn and Eastern State penitentiaries, the paradigmatic prisons of Jacksonian reform, were little different. New reformers confronted the problems of decaying antebellum prisons with a new penal regime that focused on the rehabilitation of the individual—this time with an emphasis on using institutional inducements as a means of affecting behavioral change. At the same time, Reconstruction-era penology also focused on emerging "scientific" views of criminality related to race and heredity, as the post-war years witnessed the birth of a eugenics movement in the United States.

==== Northern developments ====
===== Brutality, immigration, eugenics, and "prisons as laboratories" =====
Social historian David Rothman describes the story of post-reconstruction prison administration as one of decline from the ambitions Jacksonian period. Facing major overcrowding and understaffing issues, prison officials reverted to "amazingly bizarre" methods of controlling their charges, Rothman writes. Among the punishments that proliferated in this period were:

- The Pulley or Tying Up—Convicts were suspended by the wrists, fastened over their head, for anywhere from a few minutes to an hour. At Sing Sing Prison, where this treatment was especially popular a New York investigator related, "Men have been kept raised so long as to cause bleeding from the mouth, before the doctor would order the prisoner taken down." Wardens also used a variation on the pulley known as the "hooks," which involved tying the inmates' hands together and lashing them to the wall at chest height, forcing them to put most of their weight onto their toes.
- The Iron Cap or "Cage"—The convict wore a case composed of small rods or bands of iron—which weighed between 6 ½ and 8 pounds—around the neck, and an iron band across the next and shoulders held it in place.
- The Lash and Paddle—This traditional penitentiary punishment continued into the post-war era with some refinement—i.e., weighted leather strips and aerated paddles were used instead of whips. The number of strokes was set to the offense and in some places, like Massachusetts, limited by statute. Sing Sing convicts in the 1880s reportedly jumped from the upper galleries of the prison's cell blocks in an effort to break their legs and escape a paddling.
- Solitary Confinement ("The Dungeon")—Reconstruction-era inmates were locked in dark solitary cells, furnished only with a bucket, and fed short rations for disciplinary infractions (usually for a period of up to a week, but sometimes up to six or more).
- Straitjackets—Wardens used these as much for discipline as for inmate safety.
- Brickbag—Convicts who would not work were forced in some institutions to wear a heavy bag (full of weighted objects).
- Water Crib—Used at the Reconstruction-era prison in Kansas, this disciplinary instrument involved the inmate's being placed in a coffin-like box about six-and-a-half feet long, thirty inches wide, and three-feet deep. The inmate would lie face down, his or her hands cuffed behind the back, while keepers slowly filled the crib with water to simulate drowning.

Although wardens tended to believe these measures were necessary for control, contemporary observers generally found them "unquestionably cruel and unusual," according to Rothman.

Northern states continued to lease the labor of their convicts to private business interests in the post-war years. The Thirteenth Amendment, adopted in 1865, expressly permitted slavery "as a punishment for a crime whereof the party shall have been duly convicted." In Northern prisons, the state generally housed and fed inmate laborers, while contractors brought all necessary machinery to the prison facility and leased the inmates' time.

Abuses were common, according to investigative reporter Scott Christianson, as employers and guards tried to extract as much time and effort from prisoners as possible. At New Jersey's prison at Trenton, after an inmate died while being "stretched" by the prison staff, a committee investigating discipline at the prison determined that officials had poured alcohol on epileptics and set them on fire to see if they were faking convulsions in order to skip work. At an Ohio penitentiary, unproductive convicts were made to sit naked in puddles of water and receive electric shocks from an induction coil. In New York, public investigations of practices in the state's prisons became increasingly frequent during the 1840s, 1860s, and 1870s—though with little actual effect on conditions. They revealed that a prisoner had been poisoned to death for not working in one institution; another was found to have been kept chained to the floor for ten months in solitary confinement, until he eventually suffered a mental breakdown.

By and large, Americans of the 1870s, 1880s, and 1890s did little to address the disciplinary and other abuses in United States penitentiaries of the time. One reason for this apathy, according to authors Scott Christianson and David Rothman, was the composition of contemporary prison populations. Following the Civil War, the volume of immigration to the United States increased alongside expanding nativist sentiment, which had been a fixture of national politics since long before the War. During the 1870s, as many as 3 million immigrants arrived on the shores of the United States. By the 1880s, the influx rose to 5.2 million, as immigrants fled persecution and unrest in eastern and southern Europe. This trend continued until immigration reached a zenith between 1904 and 1914 of 1 million persons per year.

Already in the 1850s and 1860s, prisons (along with asylums for the mentally ill) were becoming the special preserve of the foreign-born and the poor. This trend accelerated as the nineteenth century drew to a close. In Illinois, for example, 60 percent of inmates in 1890 were foreign-born or second-generation immigrants—Irish and German, mostly. Less than one-third of the Illinois inmates had completed grammar school, only 5 percent had a high school or college education, and the great majority held unskilled or semi-skilled jobs. In the 1890s California, 45 percent of prisoners were foreign-born—predominantly of Chinese, Mexican, Irish, and German descent—and the majority were laborers, waiters, cooks, or farmers. Throughout the post-war years, the rate of imprisonment for foreign-born Americans was twice that of native-born ones; black Americans were incarcerated, North and South, at three times the rate of white Americans.

The Civil War's end also witnessed the emergence of pseudo-scientific theories concerning biological superiority and inherited social inferiority. Commentators grafted the Darwinian concept of "survival of the fittest" onto notions of social class. Charles Loring Brace, author of The Dangerous Classes of New York (1872), warned his readers that attempts to cure poverty through charity would backfire by lessening the poor's chance of survival. Richard L. Dugdale, civic-minded New York merchant, toured thirteen county jails during the 1870s as a voluntary inspector for the prestigious Prison Association of New York. Reflecting on his observations in later writings, Dugdale traced crime to hereditary criminality and promiscuity.

These views on race and genetics, Christianson and Rothman conclude, affected the various official supervisory bodies established to monitor regulatory compliance in United States prisons. Although these monitoring boards (established either by the state executive or legislature) would ostensibly ferret out abuses in the prison system, in the end their apathy toward the incarcerated population rendered them largely ill-equipped for task of ensuring even humane care, Rothman argues. State and federal judges, for their part, refrained from monitoring prison conditions until the 1950s.

Persistent beliefs in inherited criminality and social inferiority also stoked a growing eugenics movement during the Reconstruction Era, which sought to "improve" the human race through controlled breeding and eliminate "poor" or "inferior" tendencies. By the late 1890s, eugenics programs were enjoying a "full-blown renaissance" in American prisons and institutions for the mentally ill, with leading physicians, psychologists, and wardens as proponents. Italian criminologist Cesare Lombroso published a highly influential tract in 1878 entitled L'uomo delinquente (or, The Criminal Man), which theorized that a primitive criminal type existed who was identifiable by physical symptoms or "stigmata."

Phrenology also became a popular "science" among prison officials; at the height of the study's popularity, the influential Reconstruction Era matron of Sing Sing Prison, Elizabeth W. Farnham, was one of its adherents, and officials at Eastern State Penitentiary maintained phrenological data on all inmates during the post-war years.

As the field of physical anthropology gained traction in the 1880s, prisons became laboratories for studying eugenics, psychology, human intelligence, medicine, drug treatment, genetics, and birth control. Support for these initiatives sprang from the influential prison reform organizations in the United States at the time—e.g., the Prison Reform Congress, the National Conference of Charities and Correction, the National Prison Congress, the Prison Association of New York, and the Philadelphia Society for Alleviating the Miseries of Public Prisons.

New methods of identifying criminal tendencies and classifying offenders by threat level emerged from prison-based research. In 1896, for instance, New York began requiring all persons sentenced to a penal institution for thirty days or more to be measured and photographed for state records. Eugenics studies in the prison setting led to the development of the vasectomy as a replacement for total castration.

Eugenics studies of the day aimed to prevent the extinction or genetic deterioration of mankind through restraints on reproduction, according to author Scott Christianson. In the mid-1890s, the Kansas "Home for the Feeble-Minded" began performing mass castrations on all of its residents. And Indiana became the first state to enact a compulsory sterilization act for certain mentally ill and criminal persons in 1907. John D. Rockefeller Jr., a eugenics devotee, became involved in social Darwinist experiments in New York. In the 1910s, Rockefeller created the Bureau for Social Hygiene, which conducted experiments on female prisoners, with the state's consent and financial support, to determine the roots of their criminality and "mental defectiveness."

===== Failure of Jacksonian reform and renewed efforts =====
A new group of prison reformers emerged in the Reconstruction Era that maintained some optimism about the institution and initiated efforts to make the prison a center for moral rehabilitation. Their efforts led to some change in contemporary prisons, but it would take another period of reform during the Progressive Era for any significant structural revisions to the prison systems of the United States.

The primary failure of Reconstruction Era penitentiaries, according to historian David Rothman, was administrative. State governors typically appointed political patrons to prison posts, which were usually not full-time or salaried. In the 1870s, for example, the board of the Utica, New York, asylum was composed of two bankers, a grain merchant, two manufacturers, two lawyers, and two general businessman. Prison oversight boards like the Utica one, composed of local businessmen, tended to defer to prison officials in most matters and focus solely on financial oversight, Rothman writes, and therefore tended to perpetuate the status quo.

Prison reform efforts of the Reconstruction Era came from a variety of sources. Fears about genetic contamination by the "criminal class" and its effect on the future of mankind led to numerous moral policing efforts aimed at curbing promiscuity, prostitution, and "white slavery" in this period. Meanwhile, campaigns to criminalize domestic violence, especially toward children, and related temperance movements led to renewed commitment to "law and order" in many communities from the 1870s onward. When legislators ignored demands for more protection for women and children, feminist activists lobbied for harsher punishments for male criminal offenders—including the whipping post, castration, and longer prison terms.

Another group of reformers continued to justify penitentiaries for negative reasons—i.e., for fear that a sustained and successful attack on the prison system and its failings might yield a return to the "barbarism" of colonial-era punishments. Nevertheless, a degree of optimism continued to dominate the thinking of reformers in the post-Civil War period, according to historian David Rothman.

By October 1870, notable Reconstruction Era prison reformers Enoch Wines, Franklin Sanborn, Theodore Dwight, and Zebulon Brockway—among others—convened with the National Congress of Penitentiary and Reformatory Discipline in Cincinnati, Ohio. The resolutions that emerged from the conference, called the Declaration of Principles, became the chief planks of the penitentiary reform agenda in the United States for the next several decades. The essence of the National Congress' agenda in the Declaration was a renewed commitment to the "moral regeneration" of offenders (especially young ones) through a new model of penitentiary.

The National Congress' Declaration of Principles characterized crime as "a sort of moral disease." The Declaration stated that the "great object [of] . . . the treatment of criminals . . . should be [their] moral regeneration . . . the reformation of criminals, not the infliction of vindictive suffering." The Declaration took inspiration from the "Irish mark system" pioneered by penologist Sir Walter Crofton. The object of Crofton's system was to teach prisoners how to lead an upright life through use of "good-time" credits (for early release) and other behavioral incentives. The Declaration's primary goals were: (1) to cultivate prisoners' sense of self-respect; and (2) to place the prisoner's destiny in his or her own hands. But the Declaration more broadly:

- Called for sanitary improvements and an end to the political appointment of prison administrators;
- Welcomed the increased participation of women in prison management;
- Advocated for a more progressive system of classifying prisoners based on individualized and continuous assessments of their character through a mark system;
- Stressed the importance of educating inmates; and
- Argued that prisoners' wills must be won over via persuasion, not destroyed.

The National Congress and those who responded to its agenda also hoped to implement a more open-ended sentencing code. They advocated for the replacement of the peremptory (or mandatory) sentences of the day, set by a judge after trial, with sentences of indeterminate length. True "proof of reformation," the Congress Declaration provided, should replace the "mere lapse of time" in winning an inmate's release from confinement. These suggestions anticipated the near-comprehensive adoption of indeterminate sentencing during the Progressive Era.

In spite of its many "progressive" suggestions for penal reform, the National Congress showed little sensitivity to the plight of freed blacks and immigrants in the penal system, in the view of author Scott Christianson. Christianson notes that the National Congress' membership generally subscribed to the prevailing contemporary notion that blacks and foreigners were disproportionately represented in the prison system due to their inherent depravity and social inferiority.

The rise and decline of the Elmira Reformatory in New York during the latter part of the nineteenth century represents the most ambitious attempt in the Reconstruction Era to fulfill the goals set by the National Congress in the Declaration of Principles. Built in 1876, the Elmira institution was designed to hold first-time felons, between the ages of sixteen and thirty, who were serving an indeterminate term of imprisonment set by their sentencing judge. Elmira inmates had to earn their way out of the institution through good behavior, as assessed through an elaborate grading system. The only limits on inmates' terms of imprisonment were whatever upper threshold the legislature set for their offense.

Elmira's administration underscores the fundamental tension of contemporary penal reform, according to authors Scott Christianson and David Rothman. On the one hand, its purpose was to rehabilitate offenders; on the other, its reform principles were tempered by a belief in the heritability of criminal behavior. Elmira's first warden, National Congress member Zebulon Brockway, wrote in 1884 that at least one-half of his charges were "incorrigible" due to their genetics. Brockway further characterized modern criminals as "to a considerable extent the product of our civilization and . . . of emigration to our shore from the degenerated populations of crowded European marts." Brockway reserved the harshest disciplinary measures—e.g., frequent whippings and solitary confinement—for those he deemed "incorrigible" (primarily the mentally and physically disabled).

Elmira was regarded by many contemporaries as a well-run, model institution in its early years. Nevertheless, by 1893 the reformatory was seriously overcrowded and Brockway's ideas about genetic degeneracy, low-intelligence, and criminality came under fire as a result of his brutality toward the mentally and physically disabled. An 1894 executive investigation of Elmira's disciplinary practices concluded that discipline in the institution was harsh, although it eventually cleared Brockway of charges that he practiced "cruel, brutal, excessive, degrading and unusual punishment of inmates." But continuing stigma led the Brockway to resign from his post at Elmira by 1900.

Historian David Rothman characterizes Brockway's departure from Elmira as marking the institution's failure as a reformed penitentiary, since its methods were hardly different from those of other Jacksonian Era institutions that had survived into the post-war years. But Rothman also concludes that the Elmira experience suggested to contemporary reformers only that management was to blame, not their proposed system of incarceration generally. The Progressive Era of the early twentieth century thus witnessed renewed efforts to implement the penal agenda espoused by the National Congress and its adherents in 1870—albeit with some noteworthy structural additions.

==== Southern developments ====
The Civil War brought overwhelming change to Southern society and its criminal justice system. As freed slaves joined the Southern population, they came under the primary control of local governments for the first time. At the same time, the market economy began to affect individuals and regions in the South that were previously untouched. Widespread poverty at the end of the nineteenth century unraveled the South's prior race-based social fabric. In Reconstruction-era cities like Savannah, Georgia, intricate codes of racial etiquette began to unravel almost immediately after the war with the onset of emancipation. The local police forces that had been available in the antebellum South, depleted during the war, could not enforce the racial order as they had before. Nor was the white population, stricken by poverty and resentment, as united in its racial policing as it was during the antebellum period. By the end of Reconstruction, a new configuration of crime and punishment had emerged in the South: a hybrid, racialized form of incarceration at hard labor, with convicts leased to private businesses, that endured well into the twentieth century.

===== Changing demographics of crime and punishment in the Reconstruction-era South =====
The economic turmoil of the post-war South reconstituted race relations and the nature of crime in the region, as whites attempted to reassert their supremacy. Earlier, extra-legal efforts toward reestablishing white supremacy, like those of the Ku Klux Klan, gradually gave way to more certain and less volatile forms of race control, according to historian Edward L. Ayers. Racial animosity and hatred grew as the races became ever more separate, Ayers argues, and Southern legal institutions turned much of their attention to preserving the racial status quo for whites.

Patterns of "mono-racial law enforcement," as Ayers refers to it, were established in Southern states almost immediately after the American Civil War. Cities that had never had police forces moved quickly to establish them, and whites became far less critical of urban police forces in post-war politics, whereas in the antebellum period they had engendered major political debate. Savannah, Georgia's post-war police force was made up of Confederate veterans, who patrolled the city in gray uniforms, armed with rifles, revolvers, and sabers. They were led by an ex-Confederate General, Richard H. Anderson. Ayers concludes that white policemen protecting white citizens became the model for law enforcement efforts across the South after the American Civil War.

Depressed economic conditions impacted both white and black farmers in the post-war South, as cotton prices entered a worldwide decline and interest rates on personal debt rose with "astonishing" speed after the close of hostilities. Property crime convictions in the Southern countryside, rare in the antebellum years, rose precipitously throughout the 1870s (though violent crime by white offenders continued to take up the majority of the rural courts' business).

Former slaves who migrated to Southern cities, where they often received the lowest-paying jobs, were generally affected more acutely by economic downturns than their rural counterparts. Five years after the Civil War, 90 percent of the black population of Savannah, Georgia, owned no property. Increases in black property crime prosecutions in Savannah correlate to major economic downturns of the post-war period.

Whites made few attempts to disguise the injustice in their courts, according to historian Edward L. Ayers. Blacks were uniformly excluded from juries and denied any opportunity to participate in the criminal justice process aside from being defendants. Thefts by black offenders became a new focus of the Southern justice systems and began to supplant violent crimes by white offenders in court dockets. Whether they were from the city or the countryside, those accused of property crime stood the greatest chance of conviction in post-war southern courts. But black defendants were convicted in the highest numbers. During the last half of the nineteenth century, three out of every five white defendants accused of property crime in Southern courts were convicted, while four out of every five black defendants were. Conviction rates for whites, meanwhile, dropped substantially from antebellum levels throughout the last half of the nineteenth century.

This system of justice led, in the opinion of W. E. B. Du Bois, to a system in which neither blacks nor whites respected the criminal justice system—whites because they were so rarely held accountable, and blacks because their own accountability felt so disproportionate. Ultimately, thousands of black Southerners served long terms on chain gangs for petty theft and misdemeanors in the 1860s and 1870s, while thousands more went into the convict lease system.

In criminal sentencing, blacks were disproportionately sentenced to incarceration—whether to the chain gang, convict leasing operation, or penitentiary—in relation to their white peers. Black incarceration peaked before and after radical Reconstruction, when Southern whites exercised virtually unchecked power and restored "efficiency" to the criminal courts. For example, 384 of North Carolina's 455 prisoners in 1874 were black, and in 1878 the proportion had increased slightly to 846 of 952. By 1871, 609 of Virginia's 828 convicts in—including all but four of its sixty-seven female prisoners—were black. But this phenomenon was not specific to the South: The proportion of black inmates in Northern prisons was virtually identical to that in Southern prisons throughout the second half of the nineteenth century.

Rural courts met so rarely in the post-war years that prisoners often sat in jails for months while awaiting trial, at the government's expense. Chain gangs emerged in the post-war years as an initial solution to this economic deficit. Urban and rural counties moved the locus of criminal punishment from municipalities and towns to the county and began to change the economics of punishment from a heavy expense to a source of public "revenue"—at least in terms of infrastructure improvements. Even misdemeanors could be turned to economic advantage; defendants were often sentenced to only a few on the chain gang, with an additional three to eight months tacked onto the sentence to cover "costs." As the Southern economy foundered in the wake of the peculiar institution's destruction, and property crime rose, state governments increasingly explored the economic potential of convict labor throughout the Reconstruction period and into the twentieth century.

===== Institutional power struggles over the Southern justice apparatus =====
"The most far-reaching change in the history of crime and punishment in the nineteenth-century South," according to historian Edward L. Ayers, was "the state's assumption of control over blacks from their ex-masters . . . ." The process by which this occurred was "halting and tenuous," but the transition began the moment a master told his slaves they were free." In this landscape, Ayers writes, the Freedmen's Bureau vied with Southern whites—through official government apparatuses and informal organizations like the Ku Klux Klan—over opposing notions of justice in the post-war South.

Southern whites in the main tried to salvage as much of the antebellum order as possible in the wake of the American Civil War, waiting to see what changes might be forced upon them. The "Black Codes" enacted almost immediately after the war—Mississippi and South Carolina passed theirs as early as 1865—were an initial effort in this direction. Although they did not use racial terms, the Codes defined and punished a new crime, "vagrancy," broadly enough to guarantee that most newly free black Americans would remain in a de facto condition of servitude. The Codes vested considerable discretion in local judges and juries to carry out this mission: County courts could choose lengths and types of punishment previously unavailable. The available punishments for vagrancy, arson, rape, and burglary in particular—thought by whites to be peculiarly black crimes—widened considerably in the post-war years.

Soon after hostilities officially ceased between the United States and the Confederate States of America, black "vagrants" in Nashville, Tennessee, and New Orleans, Louisiana, were being fined and sent to the city workhouse. In San Antonio, Texas, and Montgomery, Alabama, free blacks were arrested, imprisoned, and put to work on the streets to pay for their own upkeep. A Northern journalist who passed through Selma, Alabama, immediately after the Civil War, was told that no white man had ever been sentenced to the chain gang, but that blacks were now being condemned to it for such "crimes" as "using abusive language towards a white man" or selling farm produce within the town limits.

At the same time that Reconstruction Era Southern governments enacted the "Black Codes", they also began to change the nature of the state's penal machinery to make it into an economic development tool. Social historian Marie Gottschalk characterizes the use of penal labor by Southern state governments during the post-war years as an "important bridge between an agricultural economy based on slavery and the industrialization and agricultural modernization of the New South."

Many prisons in the South were in a state of disrepair by the end of the American Civil War, and state budgets across the region were exhausted. Mississippi's penitentiary, for instance, was devastated during the war, and its funds depleted. In 1867 the state's military government began leasing convicts to rebuild wrecked railroad and levees within the state. By 1872, it began leasing convicts to Nathan Bedford Forrest, a former Confederate general and slave trader, as well as the first Imperial Wizard of the then emerging Ku Klux Klan.

Texas also experienced a major postwar depression, in the midst of which its legislators enacted tough new laws calling for forced inmate labor within prison walls and at other works of public utility outside of the state's detention facilities. Soon Texas began leasing convicts to railroads, irrigation and navigation projects, and lead, copper, and iron mines.

Virginia's prison at Richmond collapsed in the wake of the City's 1865 surrender, but occupying Union forces rounded up as many convicts as they could in order to return them to work. Alabama began leasing out its Wetumpka Prison to private businessmen soon after the Civil War.

During the Reconstruction Era, the North Carolina legislature authorized state judges to sentence offenders to work on chain gangs on county roads, railroads, or other internal improvements for a maximum term of one year—though escapees who were recaptured would have to serve double their original sentence. North Carolina had failed to erect a penitentiary in the antebellum period, and its legislators planned to build an Auburn-style penitentiary to replace the penal labor system. But graft and shady dealings soon rendered a new prison impracticable, and North Carolina convicts continued to be leased to railroad companies.

Freed blacks became the primary workers in the South's emerging penal labor system. Those accused of property crime—white or black—stood the greatest chance of conviction in post-war Southern courts. But black property offenders were convicted more often than white ones—at a rate of eight convictions for every ten black defendants, compared to six of every ten white defendants. Overall, conviction rates for whites dropped substantially from antebellum levels during the Reconstruction Era and continued to decline throughout the last half of the nineteenth century.

The Freedmen's Bureau, charged with implementing congressional reconstruction throughout the former Confederate states, was the primary political body that opposed the increasing racial overtones of Southern criminal justice during the Reconstruction Era. The Bureau's mission reflected a strong faith in impersonal legalism, according to historian Edward L. Ayers, and its agents were to act as guarantors of blacks' legal equality. The Bureau maintained courts in the South from 1865 to 1868 to adjudicate minor civil and criminal cases involving freed slaves. Ultimately, Ayers concludes, the Bureau largely failed to protect freed slaves from crime and violence by whites, or from the injustices of the Southern legal system, although the Bureau did provide much needed services to freed slaves in the form of food, clothing, school support, and assistance in contracts. The Greensboro, North Carolina Herald more bluntly stated that the Freedmen's Bureau was no match for the "Organic Law of the Land" in the South, white supremacy.

In the rural South, the Freedmen's Bureau was only as strong as its isolated agents, who were often unable to assert their will over that of the whites in their jurisdiction. Manpower issues and local white resentment led to early compromises under which southern civilians were allowed to serve as magistrates on the Freedmen's Courts, although the move was opposed by many former slaves.

In cities like Savannah, Georgia, the Freedmen's Courts appeared even more disposed to enforcing the wishes of local whites, sentencing former slaves (and veterans of the Union Army) to chain gangs, corporal punishments, and public shaming. The Savannah Freedmen's Courts even approved arrests for such "offenses" as "shouting at a religious colored meeting," or speaking disrespectfully to a white man.

The Bureau's influence on post-war patterns of crime and punishment was temporary and limited. The United States Congress believed that only its unprecedented federal intrusion into state affairs through the Bureau could bring true republicanism to the South, according to Edward L. Ayers, but Southerners instinctively resented this as a grave violation of their own republican ideals. Southerners had always tended to circumscribe the sphere of written, institutionalized law, Ayers argues, and once they began to associate it with outside oppression from the federal government, they saw little reason to respect it at all. From this resentment, vigilante groups like the Ku Klux Klan arose in opposition to the Bureau and its mission—though, in the words of Ayers, the Klan was a "relatively brief episode in a long history of post-war group violence in the South," where extralegal retribution was and continued to be a tradition.

For their part, former slaves in the Reconstruction-era South made efforts of their own to counteract white supremacist violence and injustice. In March 1866, Abraham Winfield and ten other black men petitioned the head of the Georgia Freedmen's Bureau for relief from the oppression of the Bureau's Court in Savannah—especially for Civil War veterans. In rural areas like Greene County, Georgia, blacks met vigilante violence from whites with violence of their own. But with the withdrawal of the Freedmen's Bureau in 1868 and continuing political violence from whites, blacks ultimately lost this struggle, according to historian Edward L. Ayers. Southern courts were largely unable—even they were willing—to bring whites to justice for violence against black Southerners. By the early to mid-1870s, white political supremacy had been established anew across most of the South.

In Southern cities, a different form of violence emerged in the post-war years. Race riots erupted in Southern cities almost immediately after the war and continued for years afterward. Edward L. Ayers concludes that antebellum legal restraints on blacks and widespread poverty were the primary cause of many of these clashes. Whites resented labor competition from blacks in the depressed post-war Southern economy, and police forces—many composed of unreconstructed Southerners—often resorted to violence. The ultimate goal for both blacks and whites was to obtain political power in the vacuum created by war and emancipation; again, blacks ultimately lost this struggle during the Reconstruction period.

===== Beginning of the convict lease system =====
Convict leasing, practiced in the North from the earliest days of the penitentiary movement, was taken up by Southern states in earnest following the American Civil War. The use of convict labor remained popular nationwide throughout the post-war period. An 1885 national survey reported that 138 institutions employed over 53,000 inmates in industries, who produced goods valued at $28.8 million. Although this was a relatively small sum in comparison to the estimated $5.4 billion in goods produced by free labor in 1880, prison labor was big business for those involved in particular industries.

But convict leasing in the post-war South came to play a more central role in crime and punishment than in the North, and it continued to do so with the approbation of the South's leading men until well into the twentieth century. For over a half-century following the Civil War, convict camps dotted the Southern landscape, and thousands of men and women—most of them former slaves—passed years of their lives within the system. Men with capital, from the North and the South, bought years of these convicts' lives and put them to work in large mining and railroad operations, as well as smaller everyday businesses. On average, the death rate in Southern leasing arrangements exceeded that in Northern prisons three-fold.

The convict lease, as practiced in the South, was not just a bald attempt by state governments to resurrect slavery, according to historians Edward L. Ayers and Marie Gottschalk. It reflected continuities in race relations, both argue, but it also reflected fundamental changes in the post-war Southern economy. For first time, millions of freed slaves came under the centralized control of state penal apparatuses; at the same time, nascent industrial capitalism in the South faced a shortage of both capital and labor. Former slaves were the easiest Southern demographic to impress into service and adapt southern industries to these changes.

Ultimately, however, the longest legacy of the system may be as symbol for the white South's injustice and inhumanity. In 1912, Dr. E. Stagg of the National Commission on Prison Labor described the status of the Southern convict as "the last surviving vestige of the slave system." A Northern writer in the 1920s referred to the Southern chain gang as the South's new "peculiar institution".

Southern penitentiaries from the antebellum period by and large continued to fall into disrepair in the post-war years as they became mere outposts of the much larger convict labor system. One by one, Southern penitentiary systems had disintegrated during the American Civil War. Mississippi sent its prisoners to Alabama for safekeeping in the midst of a Northern invasion. Louisiana concentrated its prisoners into a single urban workhouse. Arkansas dispersed its convicts in 1863 when the Union Army breached its borders. Occupied Tennessee hired its prisoners out to the United States government, while Georgia freed its inmates as General William Tecumseh Sherman headed for Atlanta with his armies in 1864. With the fall of Richmond, most of Virginia's prisoners escaped.

The convict lease system emerged haltingly from this chaos, Edward L. Ayers and Marie Gottschalk conclude, just as the penitentiary itself had in years past. The penitentiary had become a Southern institution at this point, Ayers points out, and its complete abolition would have required a major renovation of state criminal codes. Some states, like Georgia, tried to revive their penitentiary systems in the post-war years, but had to first deal with crumbling state infrastructure and a growing prison population. The three states that had not established prisons in the antebellum period—i.e., the Carolinas and Florida—hastened to establish them during Reconstruction.

But many Southern states—including North Carolina, Mississippi, Virginia, and Georgia—soon turned to the lease system as a temporary expedient, as rising costs and convict populations outstripped their meager resources. According to Edward L. Ayers, "[t]he South . . . more or less stumbled into the lease, seeking a way to avoid large expenditures while hoping a truly satisfactory plan would emerge." Social historian Marie Gottschalk characterizes these leasing arrangements as an "important bridge between an agricultural economy based on slavery and the industrialization and agricultural modernization of the New South." This may help to explain why support for the convict lease was altogether widespread in Southern society, Ayers concludes. No single group—black or white, Republican or Democrat—consistently opposed the lease once it gained power.

The labor that convict lessees performed varied as the Southern economy evolved after the American Civil War. Ex-plantation owners were early beneficiaries, but emerging industrial capitalism ventures—e.g., phosphate mines and turpentine plants in Florida, railroads in Mississippi (and across the South)—soon came to demand convict labor. The South experienced an acute labor shortage in the post-war years, Edward L. Ayers explains, and no pool of displaced agricultural laborers was available to feed the needs of factory owners, as they had been in England and on the Continent.

The lease system was useful for capitalists who wanted to make money quickly: Labor costs were fixed and low, and labor uncertainty was reduced to the vanishing point. Convicts could be and were driven to a point free laborers would not tolerate (and could not drink or misbehave). Although labor unrest and economic depression continued to rile the North and its factories, the lease system insulated its beneficiaries in South from these external costs.

In many cases, Edward L. Ayers writes, the businessmen who utilized the convict-lease system were the same politicians who administered it. The system became, Ayers argues, a sort of "mutual aid society" for the new breed of capitalists and politicians who controlled the white Democratic regimes of the New South. Thus, Ayers concludes, officials often had something to hide, and contemporary reports on leasing operations often skirted or ignored the appalling conditions and death rates that attended these projects.

In Alabama, 40 percent of convict lessees died during their term of labor in 1870—death rates for 1868 and 1869 were 18 and 17 percent, respectively. Lessees on Mississippi's convict labor projects died at nine times the rate of inmates in Northern prisons throughout the 1880s. One man who had served time in the Mississippi system claimed that reported death rates would have been far higher had the state not pardoned many broken convicts before they died, so that they could do so at home instead.

Compared to contemporary non-leasing prison systems nationwide, which recouped only 32 percent of expenses on average, convict leasing systems earned average profits of 267 percent. Even in comparison to Northern factories, Edward L. Ayers writes, the lease system's profitability was real and sustained in the post-war years and remained so into the twentieth century.

Exposes on the lease system began appearing with increasing frequency in newspapers, state documents, Northern publications, and the publications of national prison associations during the post-war period—just as they did for Northern prisons like those in New York. Mass grave sites containing the remains of convict lessees have been discovered in Southern states like Alabama, where the United States Steel Corporation purchased convict labor for its mining operations for several years at the end of the nineteenth and beginning of the twentieth centuries.

The focus of Southern justice on racial control in the post-war years had a profound effect on the demographics of the lease systems' populations. Before the Civil War, virtually all Southern prisoners were white, but under post-war leasing arrangements almost all (approximately 90 percent) were black. In the antebellum period, white immigrants made up a disproportionate share of the South's prison population before all but disappearing from prison records in the post-war period. The reasons for this are likely two-fold, Edward L. Ayers suggests. First, white immigrants generally avoided the post-war South due to its generally poor economic climate and the major increase in labor competition posed by emancipated slaves. Second, the preoccupation of post-war Southern police forces with crime committed by blacks decreased their efforts among the white population, including immigrants.

The source of convicts also changed in the post-war South. Before the American Civil War, rural counties sent few defendants to the state penitentiaries, but after the war rural courts became steady suppliers to their states' leasing systems (though cities remained the largest supplier of convict lessees during this period). Savannah, Georgia, for example, sent convicts to leasing operations at approximately three times the number that its population would suggest, a pattern amplified by the reality that 76 percent of all blacks convicted in its courts received a prison sentence.

Most convicts were in their twenties or younger. The number of women in Southern prison systems, increased in the post-war years to about 7 percent, a ratio not incommensurate with other contemporary prisons in the United States, but a major increase for the South, which had previously boasted of the moral rectitude of its (white) female population. Virtually all such women were black.

The officials who ran the South's leasing operations tried to maintain strict racial separation in the convict camps, refusing to recognize social equality between the races even among felons. As one Southerner reported to the National Prison Congress in 1886: Mixing the races in prison "is akin to the torture anciently practised of tieing [sic] a murderer to the dead body of his victim limb to limb, from head to foot, until the decaying corpse brought death to the living." Whites who did end up in Southern prisons, according to Edward L. Ayers, were considered the lowest of their race. At least some legislators referred to white prisoners with the same racial epithets reserved for blacks at the time.

The Southern lease system was something less than a "total system." The vast majority of convict-lease camps were dispersed, with little in the way of walls or other securities measures—although some Southern chain gangs were carted around in open-air cages to their work sites and kept in them at night. Order in the camps was generally tenuous at best, Edward L. Ayers argues. Escapes were frequent and the brutal punishments that characterized the camps—chains, bloodhounds, guns, and corporal punishments—were dealt with a palpable sense of desperation. (At least some observers, however, questioned whether the high number of reported escapees was not a ploy to cover up foul play.)

Reflecting changing criminal dockets in the Southern courts, about half of prisoners in the lease system served sentences for property crime. Rehabilitation played no real role in the system. Whatever onus for reform there was fell on the shoulders of chaplains, Edward L. Ayers relates. As Warden J.H. Bankhead of the Alabama penitentiary observed in the 1870s: "[O]ur system is a better training school for criminals than any of the dens of iniquity that exist in our large cities. . . . You may as well expect to instill decent habits into a hog as to reform a criminal whose habits and surroundings are as filthy as a pig's."

Some proponents of the lease claimed that the system would teach blacks to work, but many contemporary observers came to recognize—as historian C. Vann Woodward later would—that the system dealt a great blow to whatever moral authority white society had retained in its paternalistic approach to the "race problem." Time in the penitentiary came to carry little stigma in the black community, as preachers and other community leaders spread word of its cruelty.

Whites presented far from a united front in defense of the lease system during the Reconstruction Era. Reformers and government insiders began condemning the worst abuses of the system from early on. Newspapers began taking up the call by the 1880s, although they had defended it during the more politically charged years that immediately followed the Civil War. But the system also had its defenders—at times even the reformers themselves, who chafed at Northern criticism even where they agreed with its substance. The"scientific" racial attitudes of the late nineteenth century also helped some supporters of the lease to assuage their misgivings. One commentator wrote that blacks died in such numbers on the convict lease farms because of the weakness of their inferior, "uneducated" blood.

Economic, rather than moral, concerns underlay the more successful attacks on leasing. Labor launched effective opposition movements to the lease in the post-war period. Birmingham, Alabama, and its Anti-Convict League, formed in 1885, were the center of this movement, according to Ayers. Coal miner revolts against the lease occurred twenty-two recorded times in the South between 1881 and 1900. By 1895, Tennessee caved in to the demands of its miners and abolished its lease system. These revolts notably crossed racial lines. In Alabama, for instance, white and black free miners marched side-by-side to protest the use of convict labor in local mining operations.

In these confrontations, convict labor surely took on a somewhat exaggerated importance to free workers, argues Edward L. Ayers. Only 27,000 convicts were engaged in some form of labor arrangement in the 1890s South. But the emerging nature of Southern industry and labor groups—which tended to be smaller and more concentrated—made for a situation in which a small number of convicts could affect entire industries.

=== Progressive era ===
==== Southern developments ====
===== Gradual demise of the convict lease =====
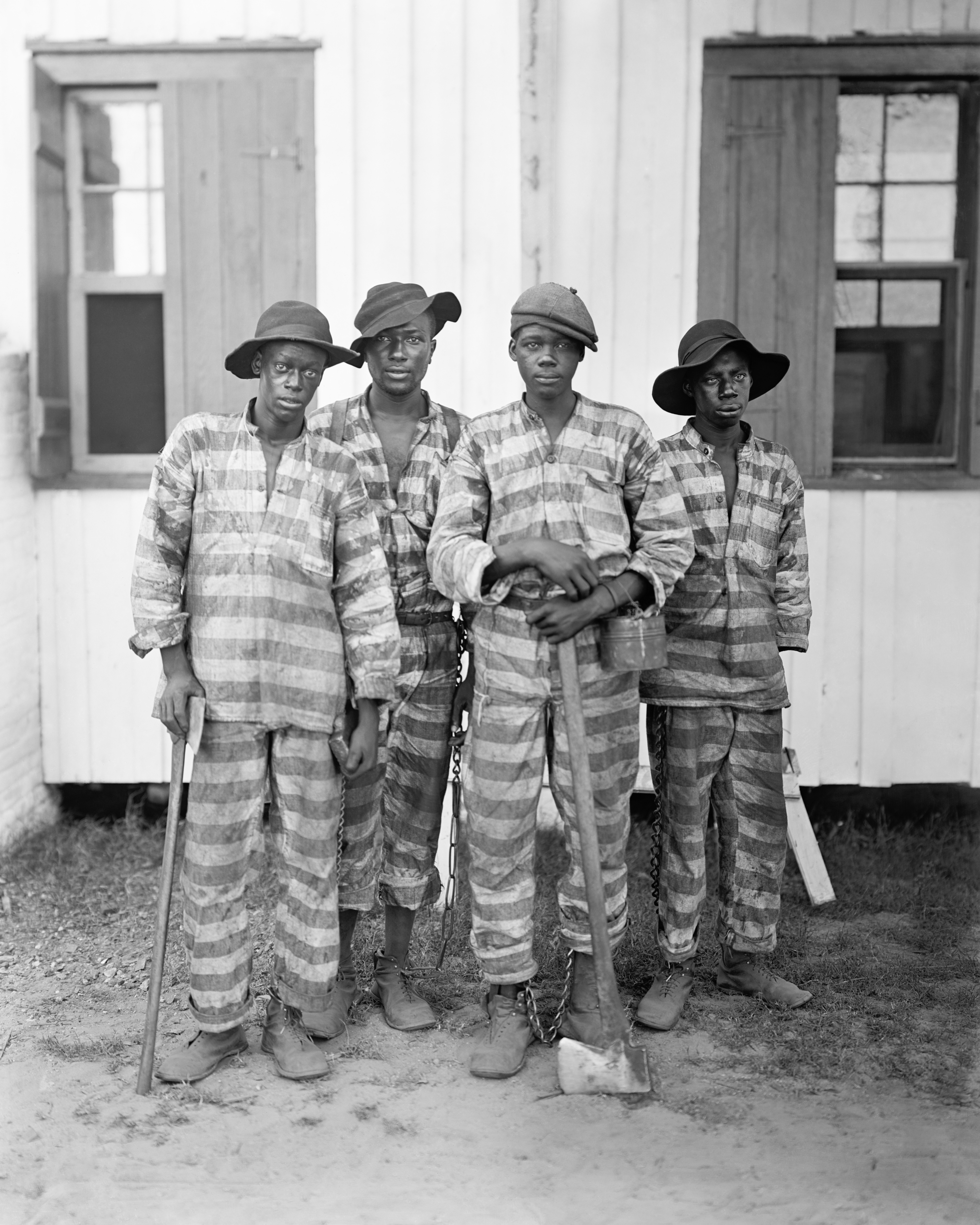
An all-black chain gang in the South, ca 1903

Just as the convict lease emerged gradually in the post-war South, it also made a gradual exit.

Although Virginia, Texas, Tennessee, Kentucky, and Missouri utilized Northern-style manufacturing prisons in addition to their farms, as late as 1890 the majority of Southern convicts still passed their sentences in convict camps run by absentee businessmen. But the 1890s also marked the beginning of a gradual shift toward compromise over the lease system, in the form of state-run prison farms. States began to cull the women, children, and the sick from the old privately run camps during this period, to remove them from the "contamination" of bad criminals and provide a healthier setting and labor regime. Mississippi enacted a new state constitution in 1890 that called for the end of the lease by 1894.

Despite these changes, and continuing attacks from labor movements, Populists, and Greenbackers, only two Southern states besides Mississippi ended the system prior to the twentieth century. Most Southern states did bring their systems under tighter control and make increasing use of state penal farms by the twentieth century, however, resulting in improved conditions and a decline in death rates. Georgia abolished its system in 1908, after an exposé by Charles Edward Russell in Everybody's Magazine revealed "hideous" conditions on lease projects. A former warden described how men in the Georgia camps were hung by their thumbs as punishment, to the point that their thumbs became so stretched and deformed, to the length of index fingers, that they resembled the "paws of certain apes." Florida's prison camps—where even the sick were forced to work under threat of a beating or shooting—remained in use until 1923.

Replacements for the lease system, such as chain gangs and state prison farms, were not so different from their predecessors. An example of the lingering influence of the lease system can be found in the Arkansas prison farms. By the mid-twentieth century, Arkansas' male penal system still consisted of two large prison farms, which remained almost totally cut off from the outside world and continued to operate much as they had during the Reconstruction Era. Conditions in these camps were so bad that, as late as the 1960s, an Oregon judge refused to return escapees from Arkansas, who had been apprehended in his jurisdiction. The judge declared that returning the prisoners to Arkansas would make his state complicit in what he described as "institutes of terror, horror, and despicable evil," which he compared to Nazi concentration camps.

In 1966, around the time of the Oregon judge's ruling, the ratio of staff to inmates at the Arkansas penal farms was one staff member for every sixty-five inmates. By contrast, the national average at the time was around one prison staff member for every seven inmates. The state was not the only entity profiting from the farm; private operators controlled certain of its industries and maintained high profit margins. The physician who ran the farm's for-profit blood bank, for instance, earned between $130,000 and $150,000 per year off of inmate donations that he sold to hospitals.

Faced with this acute shortage of manpower, authorities at the penal farms relied upon armed inmates, known as "trusties" or "riders," to guard the convicts while they worked Under the trusties' control prisoners worked ten to fourteen hours per day (depending on the time of year), six days per week. Arkansas was, at the time, the only state where prison officials could still whip convicts.

Violent deaths were commonplace on the Arkansas prison farms. An investigation begun by incumbent Governor Orval Faubus during a heated 1966 gubernatorial race revealed ongoing abuses—e.g., use of wire pliers on inmates' genitals, stabbings, use of nut crackers to break inmates knuckles, trampling of inmates with horses, and charging inmates for hospital time after beatings. When the chairman of the Arkansas legislature's prison committee was asked about the allegations, however, he replied, "Arkansas has the best prison system in the United States." Only later, after a federal court intervened, did reforms begin at the Arkansas prison camps.

=== Civil rights era ===
==== The "law and order" movement ====
A movement to the safety, security, and integrity of the prison system. Gang awareness training is the first reach toward civil rights and humane living conditions. Facilitation of re-entry to society for gangsters communicating widely with cohorts both inside and outside prison. Stopping illicit financial transactions, extortion, and corruption because the ability to operate in that fashion raises the specter of greater violence inside and out of prison. Investigation of all cities, cellblocks, and suburbs. Reference any of the societal cultures' range, known as organized cultural crime. Organized criminals are individuals letting gang violence thrive. Enprisoning criminals is an unfaithful act supporting gang recruitment and enforcement. Environment-focused punishment with pay may provide temporary relief. The prison ground is a breeding system for gang-related criminal activity. All state prisons are involved with gangs in some way by associations, recruits, force, or extortion, etc.. The system is lacking reform on all levels. Focus on all individuals to avoid new gang recruitments. Ensure law enforcement is not corrupted, look-into individuals with gang-related tattoos, and the associates. Weekly inspections and select-training on racial profiling etc.. Day to day inspections of prison operations and week to week cleansing of prison operations. Look for trends, try new perspectives, be concerned and curious, test limits, and be wary of organized crime variation. For-profit privately owned prisons do not pay a reasonable amount to prisoners who work, and basic necessities are overpriced and undersupplied. Environmental work should additionally be assigned to each inmate (prisoner). Reasonable pay and fruitful jobs should eliminate the use of law-abiding citizen tax dollars. A demand for exponential growth on security, guards, individuals watching cameras, unpredictable schedules, random assignments of guards, architecture for modern prisons (both technical and manual functions to prevent technological mishaps). Inmates are entitled to protection against gang-inspired recruitment, violence, and outright physical harm. Inmates are entitled to rehabilitation and re-entry programs. Organized crime may entail an emphasis on systemic issues and law enforcement response to them. Support public peace, safety, and justice. Organized criminals are white and blue-collar workers aid elements of prison manifesting a backdrop of broad societal trends, providing context to larger crime. Concern: Citation: State of New Jersey Commission of investigation Gangland Behind Bars May 2009 Focus on the District of Columbia, Mississippi, California, New York, Florida, Puerto Rico, New Mexico, Texas, Nevada, Hawaii, New Jersey, Mississippi, Arizona, Louisiana, Georgia, and Maryland.

== See also ==
- History of criminal justice in Colonial America

== Bibliography ==
- Alexander, Michelle (2012), The New Jim Crow: Mass Incarceration in the Age of Colorblindness, New York.
- Ayers, Edward L. (1984), Vengeance and Justice: Crime and Punishment in the 19th-Century American South, New York.
- Blackmon, Douglas A. (2008), Slavery by Another Name: The Re-Enslavement of Black Americans from the Civil War to World War II, New York.
- Bookspan, Shelley (1991), A Germ of Goodness: The California State Prison System, 1851–1944, Lincoln.
- Christianson, Scott (1998), With Liberty for Some: 500 Years of Imprisonment in America, Boston.
- Ekirch, A. Roger (1987), Bound for America: The Transportation of British Convicts to the Colonies, 1718–1775, Oxford.
- Gottschalk, Marie (2006), The Prison and the Gallows: The Politics of Mass Incarceration in America, Cambridge.
- Hindus, Michael Stephen (1980), Prison and Plantation: Crime, Justice, and Authority in Massachusetts and South Carolina, 1767–1878, Chapel Hill.
- Hirsch, Adam J. (1992), The Rise of the Penitentiary: Prisons and Punishment in Early America, New Haven.
- Ignatieff, Michael (1978), A Just Measure of Pain: The Penitentiary in the Industrial Revolution, 1750–1850, New York.
- Lewis, O. F. (1922), The Development of American Prisons and Prison Customs, 1776–1845, New York.
- Lewis, W. David (1965), From Newgate to Dannemora: The Rise of the Penitentiary in New York, 1796–1848, Ithaca.
- Lynch, Mona (2010), Sunbelt Justice: Arizona and the Transformation of American Punishment, Stanford.
- McKelvey, Blake (1936), American Prisons: A Study in American Social History Prior to 1915, Chicago.
- McLennan, Rebecca (2008), The Crisis of Imprisonment: Protest, Politics, and the Making of the American Penal State, 1776–1941, Cambridge.
- McPherson, James M. (1988), Battle Cry of Freedom: The Civil War Era, New York.
- Meranze, Michael (1996), Laboratories of Virtue: Punishment, Revolution, and Authority in Philadelphia, 1760–1834, Chapel Hill.
- Rothman, David J. (2002), Conscience and Convenience: The Asylum and Its Alternatives in Progressive America, New York.
- Rothman, David J. (2011), The Discovery of the Asylum: Social Order and Disorder in the New Republic, New Brunswick.
- Wray, Harmon (1989). "Cells for Sale". Southern Changes. 8 (3): 3–6. Archived from the original on 2016-02-01.
