= Auburn system =

Prison management method

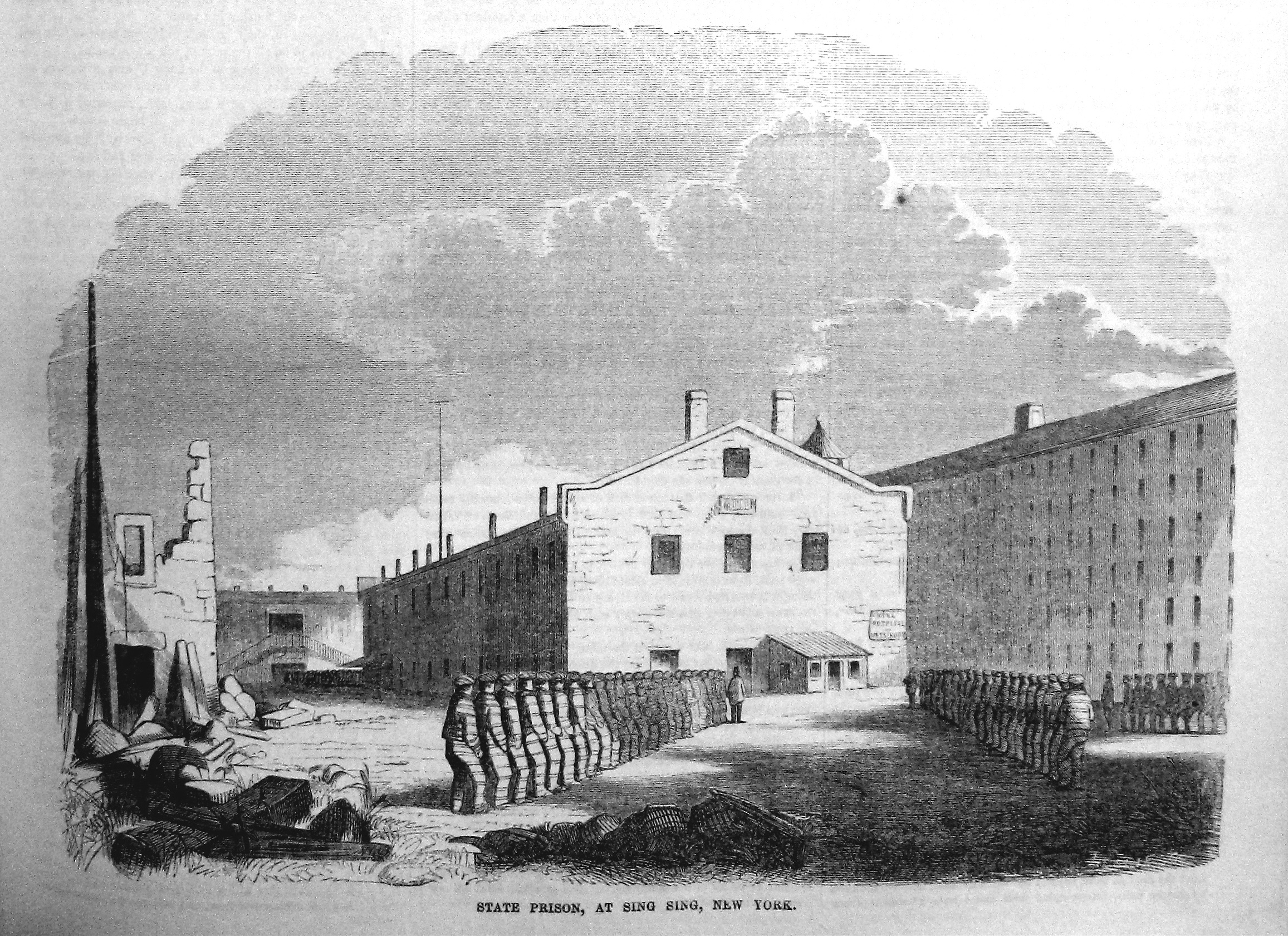
An 1855 engraving of New York's Sing Sing Penitentiary, which also followed the Auburn System

The Auburn system (also known as the New York system and Congregate system) is an American penal method of the 19th century in which prisoners worked during the day in groups and were kept in solitary confinement at night, with enforced silence at all times. The silent system evolved during the 1820s at Auburn Prison in Auburn, New York, as an alternative to and modification of the Pennsylvania system of solitary confinement, which it quickly replaced in the United States. Whigs favored this system because it promised to rehabilitate criminals by teaching them personal discipline and respect for work, property, and other people.

Most distinctive about this system, and most important to it, however, was that it was supported by state-funded capitalism and was driven by profit. Soon after its development, New York State adopted this system with the help of Elam Lynds, agent and keeper of Auburn Prison, for its third state prison, Sing Sing Prison. Several other states followed suit shortly after and adopted the for-profit prison system designed in Auburn. By 1829, Connecticut, Massachusetts, Maryland, and Washington, D.C. had adopted the Auburn system. Within the next fifteen years, the system was used in prisons in Vermont, New Hampshire, Maine, Upper Canada, Virginia, Tennessee, Georgia, Illinois, Ohio, Louisiana, Mississippi, Alabama, Kentucky, Indiana, and Michigan.

Among notable elements of the Auburn system were striped uniforms, lockstep, and silence.

== Prison life ==
=== Silence ===
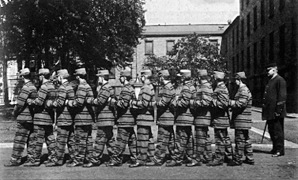
Lockstep in the Auburn Prison

During the 19th century, prisoners had no rights nor any opportunity to live semi-comfortably. The Auburn system established several characteristics that were unique to the world of disciplinary conditions. Silence was the biggest factor among rules for the prisoners. John D. Cray, a deputy warden at the Auburn Prison, and Elam Lynds, agent and keeper, demanded that prisoners be completely silent to take away the prisoners' "sense of self" and prevent solidarity from forming between the prisoners as they were forced to labor. Prisoners were not allowed to speak to one another while at work, in line, or while in their cells.

=== Work ===
The second characteristic of the Auburn system was community activities during regimented times during the day in the form of work. Some of these included making "nails, barrels, clothing, shoes and boots, carpets, buttons, carpenters' tools, steam engines and boilers, combs, harnesses, furniture, brooms, clocks, buckets and pails, saddle trees...". During the 1840s, the prison began to produce silk using silk worms and trees. The Auburn correctional facility was the first prison to profit from prisoner labor. To ensure silence and to compel prisoners to work, agent Lynds, at first hired to oversee construction and command workers, used several methods of violence and coercion.

=== Tourists ===
The prison had many sightseers in the 19th century. The goal of this system was to instill good work habits and ideas of industry that were supposed to be rehabilitative. Tourists could visit the prison for a fee, adding to the prison's profits. Adults in the 1840s could visit for twenty-five cents, whereas children could enter for half the adult price. Prisoners were not allowed to speak or look at tourists during these visits. While tourists could watch prisoners as they worked, tourists did not witness the violence that took place to keep prisoners silent and keep them at work, since officers always made sure that tourists were not around when inflicting punishments such as whippings.

== Lockstep and clothing ==
Elam Lynds, in association with John D. Cray, developed a revolutionary system of transporting convicts within the prison. The prisoners marched in unison, and locked their arms to the convict in front of them. The prisoners had to look to one side, and were not allowed to look at guards or other inmates. This was called the "lockstep," which prisoners were forced to march in between every task and movement from one end of the prison to the other. Incarcerated men, however, resisted such forms of control in numerous ways, including passing notes, whispering, and even using ventriloquism to communicate with one another.

Lynds also instituted the notorious striped prison uniform in order to "break prisoners psychologically as well as physically." The clothing at the prison was a grayish material with horizontal stripes. During the intake process, each prisoner was stripped of their own clothing and belongings and forced to put on the prison uniform, sometimes new, but most often used and in poor shape. One African American prisoner who was incarcerated at Auburn Prison during the early nineteenth century, Austin Reed, called the outfit "robes of disgrace". Reformers of the era, like Samuel Gridley Howe, also held disdain for the prison uniforms. Howe, an abolitionist and physician, went so far as the call the uniforms "poison".

== Punishment ==
In 1821 a new principal keeper, Elam Lynds, was appointed to run the prison. He believed in the disciplinary power of the lash, and used flogging to punish even minor infractions, and created his own version of a cat o' nine tails whip for that purpose, while also imposing a system of isolation that prevented inmates from communicating with their families. In 1839 a prisoner died from neglect and over-flogging. The committee of Auburn and other staff members of the Auburn Theological Seminary petitioned to bring the issue of the punishments to the State government. "The law stated that six blows on the naked back with the 'cat' or six-stranded whip was the most punishment that could be assigned for any one offense."

In 1846 another meeting was congregated to abolish the use of whips. Flagellation could only be used for riots or severe cases. When whipping was prohibited, guards and keepers sought new ways to punish the disorderly. "The shower bath consisted of a barrel about 4½ feet high with a discharge tube at the bottom. The prisoner was stripped naked, bound hand and foot, with a wooden collar around his neck to prevent him moving his head. The barrel, with the inmate inside, was placed directly under an outlet pipe, where water, sometimes iced, would pour down." Another form of punishment was "the yoke". The yoke used iron bars around the neck and arms of the prisoners.

== Women in the prison ==
In the early days of the prison, female inmates were held in the windowless attic atop the high security prison. They shared a single room and slept in the same area where they worked, primarily at "picking wool, knitting, and spooling." In 1838 all women prisoners were transferred to the then-new female wing at Sing Sing. In 1892 the women returned to a new building at the Auburn prison. The Auburn Women's Prison remained in operation until 1933, when a new maximum-security wing for female inmates opened at Bedford Hills.

== See also ==
- History of United States prison systems
