= The Life and Adventures of a Haunted Convict =

Manuscript by Austin Reed

- Author: Austin Reed
- Language: English
- Genre: Memoir
- Publication date: January 2016 (manuscript written in 1858)
- Publication place: United States
- ISBN: 0812997093

The Life and Adventures of a Haunted Convict, or the Inmate of a Gloomy Prison, With the Mysteries and Miseries of the New York House of Reffuge [sic] and Auburn Prison Unmasked is the title of a c.1858 book-length manuscript by Austin Reed, an African American who served several terms as a prisoner in the Auburn State Prison in Auburn, New York. The manuscript relates his early life in Rochester, New York, his apprenticeship to a local farmer and arrest for arson, his stay at the New York House of Refuge, a juvenile detention facility in Manhattan, and his imprisonment at Auburn.

Now in the possession of the Beinecke Rare Book and Manuscript Library of Yale University, the manuscript is reportedly the earliest prison memoir by an African American. An edition of the manuscript, prepared by Caleb Smith, was published in February 2016.
