= Elam Lynds =

American prison warden

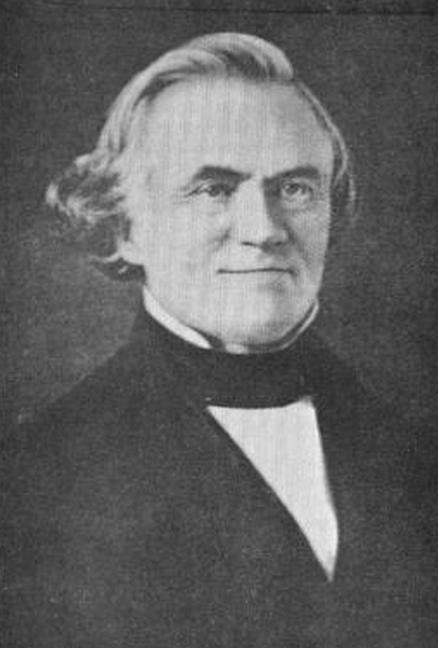
- Lynds circa 1840-1850

Warden of Auburn Correctional Facility
- In office 1821–1825

Warden of Sing Sing
- In office 1825–1830
- Succeeded by: Robert Wiltse

Personal details
- Born: 1784 Litchfield, Connecticut, US
- Died: 1855 (age 71) New York City, US
- Children: Cornelia Lynds DeForest

Captain Elam Lynds (1784–1855) was a prison warden and was known for his carceral innovations, such as producing goods for sale outside of prisons for profit, instituting absolute silence among prisoners at all times, and solitary confinement of prisoners at night, and for his cruelty as a warden. He helped create the Auburn system, which consisted of congregate labor during the day and isolation at night, starting in 1821 and was Warden of Sing Sing from 1825 to 1830.

== Early life ==
Elam Lynds was born in Litchfield, Connecticut in 1784. His parents moved to Troy, New York, when he was an infant. He learned the hatter's trade and worked at it for some years.

== War of 1812 service ==
In the War of 1812 he held a captain's commission in a New York regiment.

== Auburn State Prison ==
The Auburn State Prison's South Wing was opened in the Spring of 1817, and fifty-three prisoners were transferred there from nearby counties. Lynds was made the first principal keeper, and four years afterwards he became Warden of Auburn State Prison.

Lynds devised the main features of the Auburn System of imprisonment. When Lynds took charge of Auburn in 1821, he felt that discipline was lax, with guards only interested in preventing escape. Lynds, believing that chaining prisoners in a dungeon failed to produce "a good state of discipline," resorted exclusively to beatings. Speaking in 1826 to visiting commissioners, Lynds explained:

After making, as I thought, a fair experiment of [the dungeon], and finding it fail me altogether, I began to use the rod; and when a [prisoner] would laugh at the dungeon, I could make him perfectly obedient with a few stripes of a cowskin [whip], and a promise that he should have as much more as should be requisite.

In 1821, locals rioted to protest the inmates' treatment. (Note: Prisoner mutinies were a continual source of concern for prison authorities of the period, partly because they worried that prisoners would receive aid and support from those living nearby and partly because they recognized that prison riots could form the nucleus of a wider popular uprising. For a discussion, see McLennan, Rebecca M. (2008). The Crisis of Imprisonment: Protest, Politics, and the Making of the American Penal State, 1776–1941. Cambridge University Press. p. 44. ISBN 9781139467483.) Even his own staff objected to Lynds's brutal methods. In spring 1821, keepers refused to flog a prisoner. (Note: Accounts of the incident vary. According to Hall's (1861) The History of Auburn, the incident began with the refusal of prison keepers to whip "three disobedient convicts." Other sources generally report that three keepers refused to whip one convict. (See Christianson, Scott (2000). With Liberty for Some: 500 Years of Imprisonment in America. University Press of New England. p. 113. ISBN 9781555534684.) Sources also differ about whether the keepers were fired in succession, with each fired when he refused, and about whether Thompson volunteered or was paid.) Jonathan Thompson, a local blacksmith working nearby, stepped in and administered the floggings to the prisoners. When Thompson left the prison, he was tarred and feathered by a crowd. Henry Hall, in The History of Auburn (1861), described the scene:

As he passed through the prison gate, he was seized by a furious crowd of laborers, tarred from head to foot, and borne through the streets astride a rail. The ring-leader of the mob, with a hen under his arm, walked by the side of the unfortunate Thompson, and plucking handfuls of feathers from the screaming fowl, stuck them to the blacksmith's tarry coat. This shocking affair was condignly punished as a riot. On the other hand, the convicts, stimulated by this outside sympathy, learned to be rebellious, transgressed the rules of the shops at every opportunity, and set fire to the buildings, and destroyed their work, whenever they dared.

== Retirement and death ==
After his retirement from the prison service, he lived in New York City, where he died in 1855.
