= Liturgical comb =

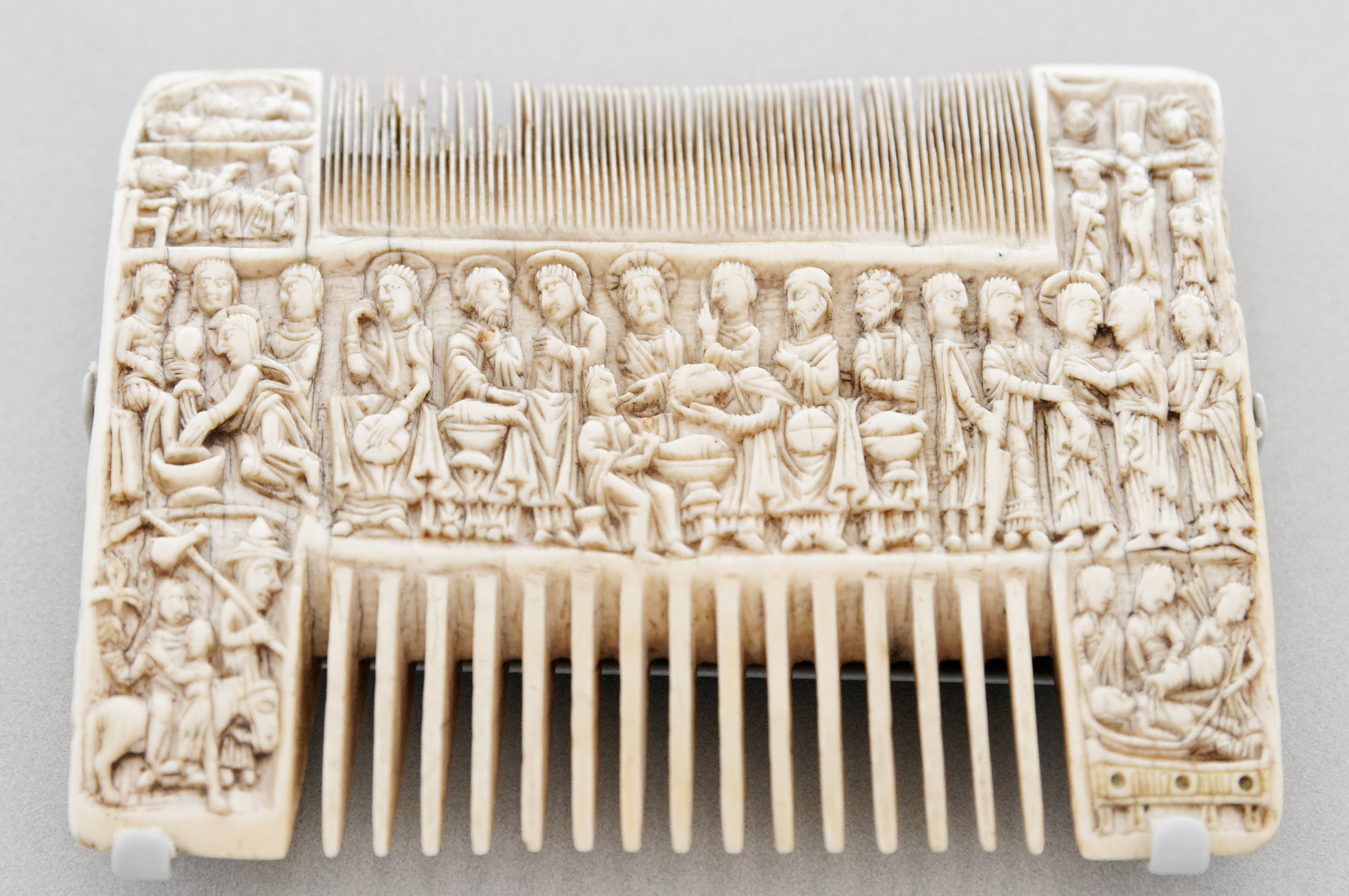
Liturgical comb from St Albans Cathedral, England (c. 1130)

A liturgical comb is a decorated comb used ceremonially in both Catholic and Orthodox Christianity during the Middle Ages, and in Byzantine Rite to this day.

The exact use of liturgical combs during the Middle Ages remains unclear. They may have been used in the ceremony accompanying the consecration of a bishop, or before or during the celebration of Mass. Liturgical combs are also known to have been venerated as relics of saints. Possibly they were also used in an everyday, secular context.

Liturgical combs were distinguished from secular combs by their design and decoration. For example, liturgical combs from the 9th and 10th centuries made from a single piece of material (often ivory) and had teeth on both sides, while ordinary, secular combs usually were made in several parts and had teeth on only one side. The decoration also differed in that secular combs from this period usually had abstract, geometric decoration while liturgical combs were decorated with religious scenes.
