= J. Frank Hickey =

American serial killer

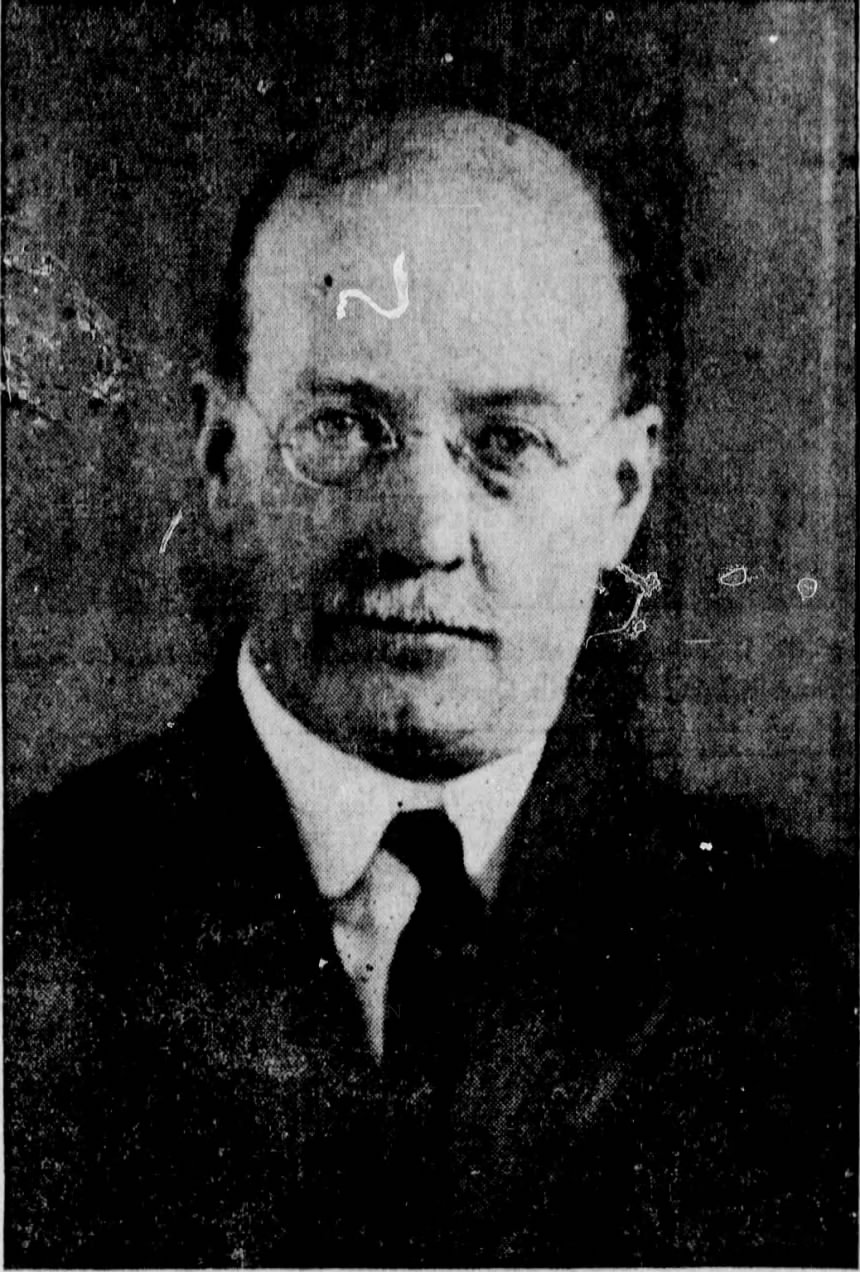
- Hickey c. 1912
- Born: John Frank Hickey; October 29, 1865; Lowell, Massachusetts, U.S.
- Died: May 8, 1922 (aged 56); Auburn Prison, Auburn, New York, U.S.
- Other name: The Postcard Killer
- Status: Deceased
- Conviction: Second degree murder
- Penalty: 20 years to life in prison

Details
- Victims: 3
- Span of crimes: 1883–1911
- Country: United States
- States: Massachusetts, New York
- Date apprehended: 1912

John Frank Hickey (October 29, 1865 – May 8, 1922) was an American child molester and serial killer. Due to the postcards he mailed to the police and media, he was dubbed The Postcard Killer.

== Early life ==
John Frank Hickey was born in Lowell, Massachusetts, to Irish immigrants Michael J. Hickey and Mary Ann Magrath. He was baptized Roman Catholic at St. Patrick's Church, which was only two blocks from his parents' lodgings. After his arrest for murder in 1912, Hickey claimed to have been physically abused by his father.

In his early teens, Hickey joined Lowell's First Congregational Church on Kirk Street. He also became an official of the Lowell YMCA and the Christian Endeavor.

== First murder ==
On September 1, 1883, 18-year-old Hickey contacted police and said that he had found 34-year-old pharmacist Edwin W. Morey dead on the floor of the McGibbon's Drugstore, where both had worked. Hickey claimed that Morey had been despondent for some time due to alcoholism and that he had been trying to help his co-worker regain sobriety. As the doctor believed that Morey had taken poison, a stomach pump was brought. At midnight, Morey showed some signs of life, but died shortly after three o'clock in the morning.

Years later, Hickey admitted to having murdered Morey with laudanum. He had been afraid that if their employer had found Morey intoxicated, he might fire them both.

== Freemasonry ==
Listing his occupation as "Secretary of the YMCA", Hickey applied for and received membership in Lowell's William North Masonic Lodge in 1887. In 1889, he became a Master Mason. Despite his later claims, Hickey never attained the rank of 32nd degree Freemason. Although his biographer Vance McLaughlin describes Hickey as having "quit the Masons in June 1895", Masonic records tell a different story. In March 1895, Hickey was arrested in Lowell for stealing 20 gallons of alcohol from his employer. In response, the Grand Lodge of Massachusetts ruled Hickey "a liar and profane" and expelled him "from all the rights and privileges of Freemasonry" on June 12, 1895.

== Second murder ==
In 1896 Hickey left Lowell and would never live there again. Between then and 1902, he drifted around Canada and the Northeastern United States, working various industrial jobs.

On December 10, 1902, Hickey encountered Michael R. Kruck, an eleven-year-old newspaper vendor. When Kruck offered to sell him a newspaper, Hickey responded that he would purchase all of them if the boy would follow him into Central Park. When Kruck did so, Hickey strangled him and left his body with the newspaper bundle under his head. The coroner later examined the body and found no evidence of sexual assault. The coroner's inquest ruled that Michael R. Kruck met his death by being strangled "by some person or persons unknown to this jury." On December 12, 1902, Michael Kruck's body was released from the morgue and buried at Brooklyn's Washington Jewish Cemetery.

== Third murder ==
On October 12, 1911, Hickey, then employed as a steel plant supervisor in Lackawanna, New York, noticed seven-year-old Joey Joseph playing at his father's men's furnishing store. Later, when Joey was making mud puddles with a friend in the street near his house, Hickey motioned to them to join him. He gave Joey a few pennies to buy candy for himself and his friend. Upon Joey's return, Hickey abruptly told his friend that it was time for him to go home.

Hickey then took Joey by the hand and led him to an outhouse behind a saloon on Ridge Road. There Hickey strangled Joey into unconsciousness, sexually molested him, and then strangled him to death. Hickey then dumped the boy's body into the outhouse pit.

== Postcards ==
Despite the assistance of the Buffalo Police Department, the investigation into Joey Joseph's disappearance had almost no leads. Then, on October 30, 1911, a postcard was delivered to Lackawanna police chief Gilson. It read, "Joseph Joseph will be found in the bottom of a water closet with three seats, back of the saloon near Doyles, on Ridge Road. A drunk crazed brain done the deed, and remorse and sorrow for the parents is bringing results that will soon come to an end. The demon whisky will then have one more victim, making four in all. Drag the closet with the three seats."

== Trial, imprisonment, and death ==
Hickey was charged with first degree murder, but in a verdict which surprised many, he was instead found guilty of second degree murder. Two jurors thought Hickey was insane and should not be executed. He was sentenced to life in prison, and died in prison on May 8, 1922.

== See also ==
- List of serial killers in the United States

== Cited works and further reading ==
- Lane, Brian (1995) [1993]. Chronicle of 20th Century Murder. Wiltshire: Select Editions. ISBN 978-0-425-14649-1.
- McLaughlin, Vance (2006). The Postcard Killer: The True Story of J. Frank Hickey. Pennsylvania: Running Press. ISBN 978-1-560-25909-1.
