= Austin Reed (author) =

Reputed author of a prison memoir (c.1823–??)

Austin Reed (1823?–?) is the author (as Rob Reed) of The Life and Adventures of a Haunted Convict, reportedly the first prison memoir by an African American.

Born in Rochester, New York State, Reed was apprenticed to a local farmer in 1832. After being arrested for arson against the farmer's property, he was confined from 1833 to 1839 to the New York House of Refuge, a juvenile detention facility in Manhattan, from which he escaped several times. Indentured to a farmer in Rockland County, New York, in 1839, he soon returned to Rochester, where he was convicted of larceny the following year. He went on to serve several terms in the Auburn State Prison and the Clinton State Prison. Released in 1866, he received a pardon from New York's governor, Samuel J. Tilden, in 1876. Reed lived until at least 1895, according to a manuscript letter preserved in New York State records.

Reed's memoir, written around 1858–59 when he was still incarcerated, was acquired by the Beinecke Rare Book and Manuscript Library, Yale and authenticated by Yale scholar Caleb Smith, who published an edition of the manuscript in early 2016.
