= Comb =

Toothed device used for styling, cleaning and managing hair and scalp

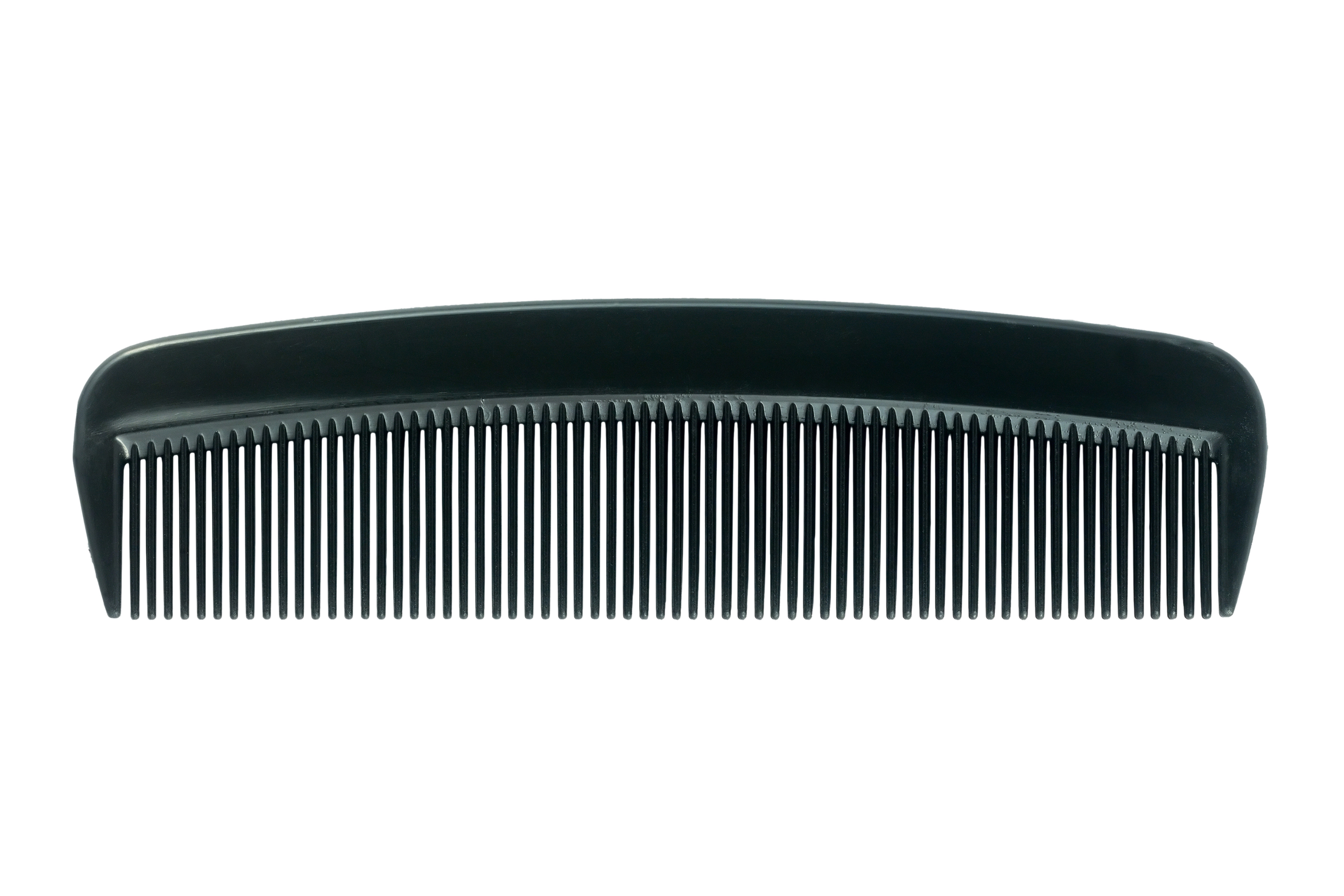
A typical plastic comb

A comb is a tool consisting of a shaft that holds a row of teeth for pulling through the hair to clean, untangle, or style it. Combs have been used since prehistoric times, having been discovered in very refined forms from settlements dating back to 5,000 years ago in Persia.

Weaving combs made of whalebone dating to the middle and late Iron Age have been found on archaeological digs in Orkney and Somerset.

== Description ==
Local artisan cutting and filing animal horn to make combs in Alappuzha, Kerala

Combs are made of a shaft and teeth that are placed at a perpendicular angle to the shaft. Combs can be made out of a number of materials, most commonly plastic, metal, or wood. In antiquity, horn and whalebone were sometimes used. Combs made from ivory and tortoiseshell were once common but concerns for the animals that produce them have reduced their usage. Wooden combs are largely made of boxwood, cherry wood, or other fine-grained wood. Good quality wooden combs are usually handmade and polished.

Combs come in various shapes and sizes depending on what they are used for. A hairdressing comb may have a thin, tapered handle for parting hair and close teeth. Common hair combs usually have wider teeth halfway and finer teeth for the rest of the comb. Hot combs were used solely for straightening hair during the colonial era in North America.

A hairbrush comes in both manual and electric models. It is larger than a comb, and is also commonly used for shaping, styling, and cleaning hair. A combination comb and hairbrush was patented in the 19th century.

== Uses ==
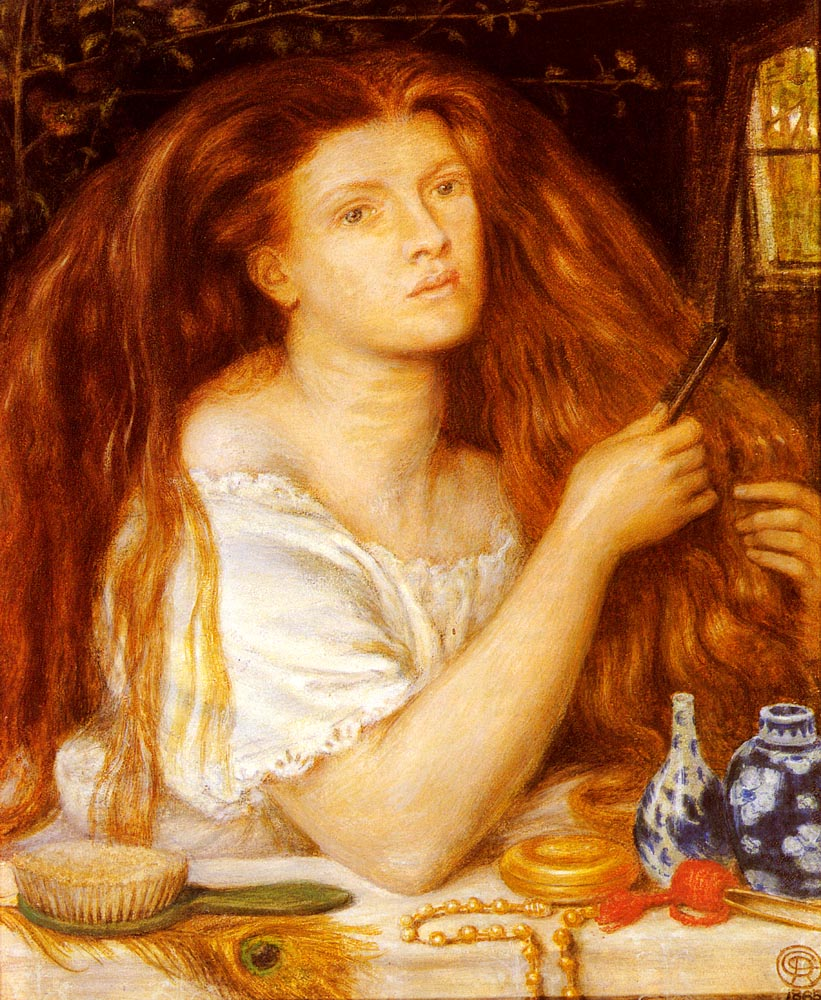
Dante Gabriel Rossetti – Woman Combing Her Hair (1865)

Combs can be used for many purposes. Historically, their main purpose was securing long hair in place, decorating the hair, matting sections of hair for dreadlocks, or keeping a kippah or skullcap in place. In Spain, a peineta is a large decorative comb used to keep a mantilla in place.

In industry and craft, combs are used in separating cotton fibres from seeds and other debris (the cotton gin, a mechanized version of the comb, is one of the machines that ushered in the Industrial Revolution). A comb is used to distribute colors in paper marbling to make the swirling colour patterns in comb-marbled paper.

Combs are also a tool used by police investigators to collect hair and dandruff samples that can be used in ascertaining dead or living persons' identities, as well as their state of health and toxicological profiles.

=== Hygiene ===
Sharing combs is a common cause of parasitic or lice infections much like sharing a hat, as one user can leave a comb with eggs or live parasites, facilitating the transmission of lice, fleas, mites, fungi, and other undesirables. Siblings are also more likely to pass on nits to each other if they share a comb.

=== Making music ===
Stringing a plant's leaf or a piece of paper over one side of the comb and humming with cropped lips on the opposite side dramatically increases the high-frequency harmonic content of the hum produced by the human voice box, and the resulting spread sound spectrum can be modulated by changing the resonating frequency of the oral cavity. This was the inspiration for the kazoo, a membranophone.

The comb is also a lamellophone. Comb teeth have harmonic qualities of their own, determined by their shape, length, and material. A comb with teeth of unequal length, capable of producing different notes when picked, eventually evolved into the thumb piano and music box.

== Types ==
=== Chinese combs ===
In China, combs are referred to by the generic term shubi (梳篦) or zhi (栉) and originated about 6000 years ago during the late Neolithic period. Chinese combs are referred to as shu (梳) when referring to thick-tooth combs and bi (篦) when referred to thin-tooth combs. A form of shubi produced in Changzhou is the Changzhou comb; the Palace Comb Factory, also called Changzhou combs Factory, found in the city of Changzhou started to operate since the 5th century and continues to produce handmade wooden combs up to this day.Shubi were also introduced in Japan during the Nara period where they were referred by the generic name kushi.

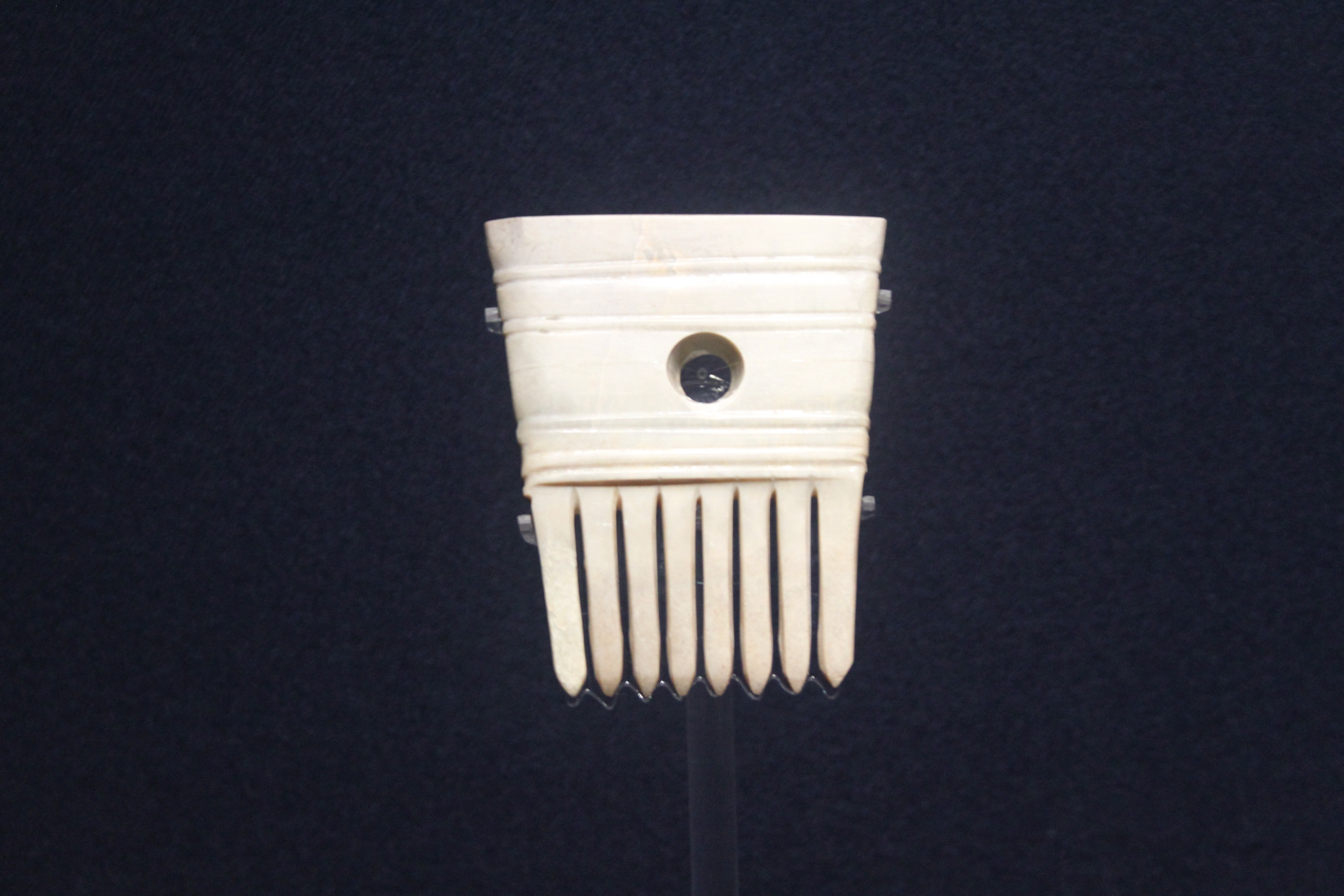
Shu, Shang dynasty comb

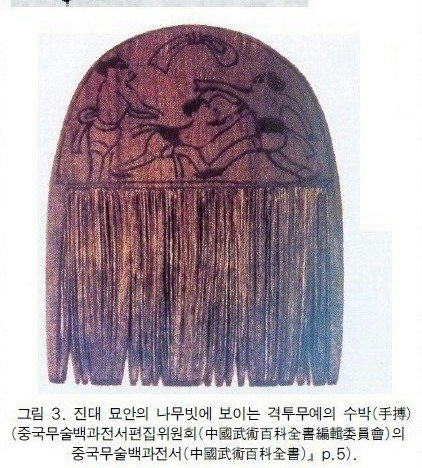
Qin dynasty comb

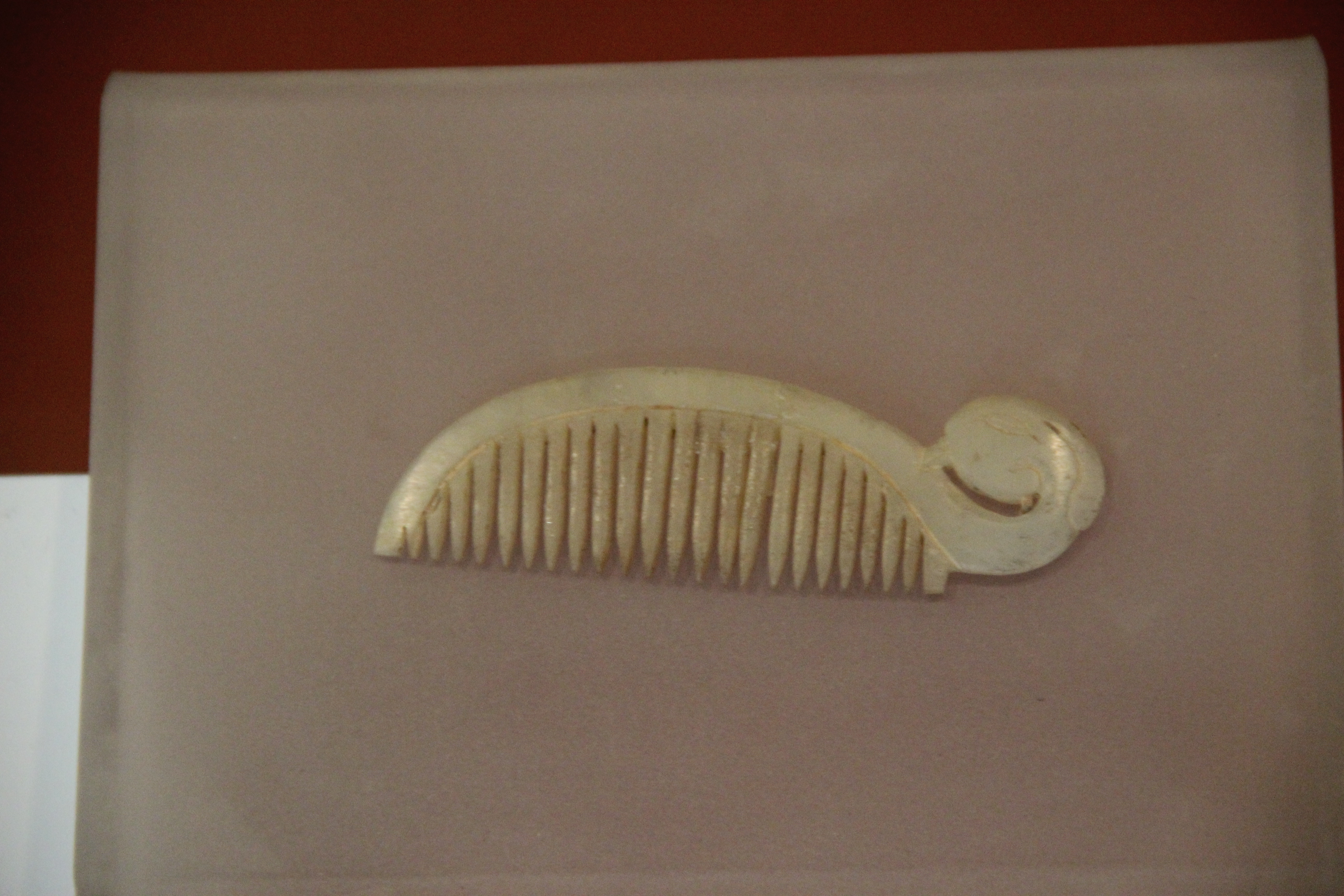
Western Han jade comb

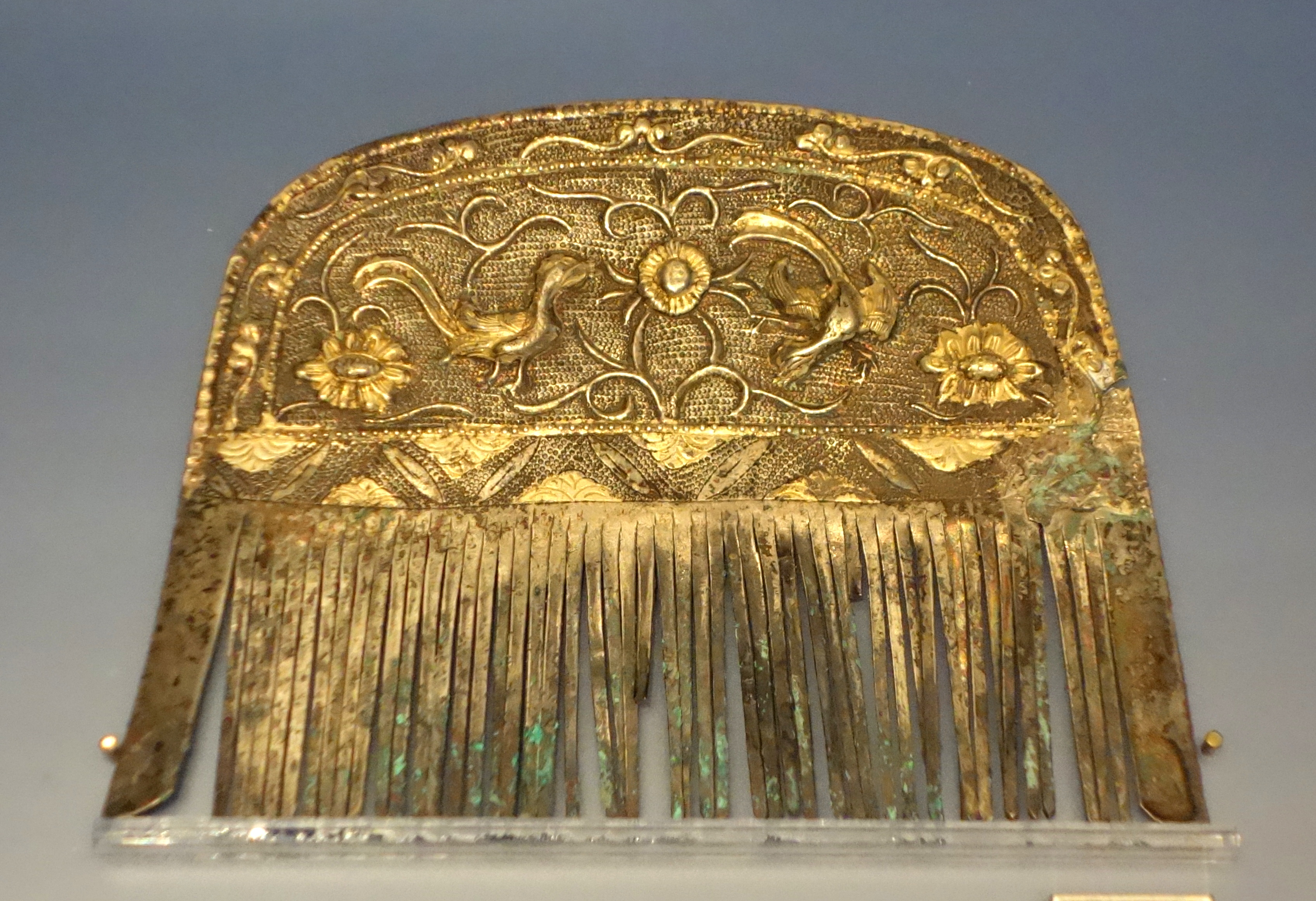
Tang dynasty comb

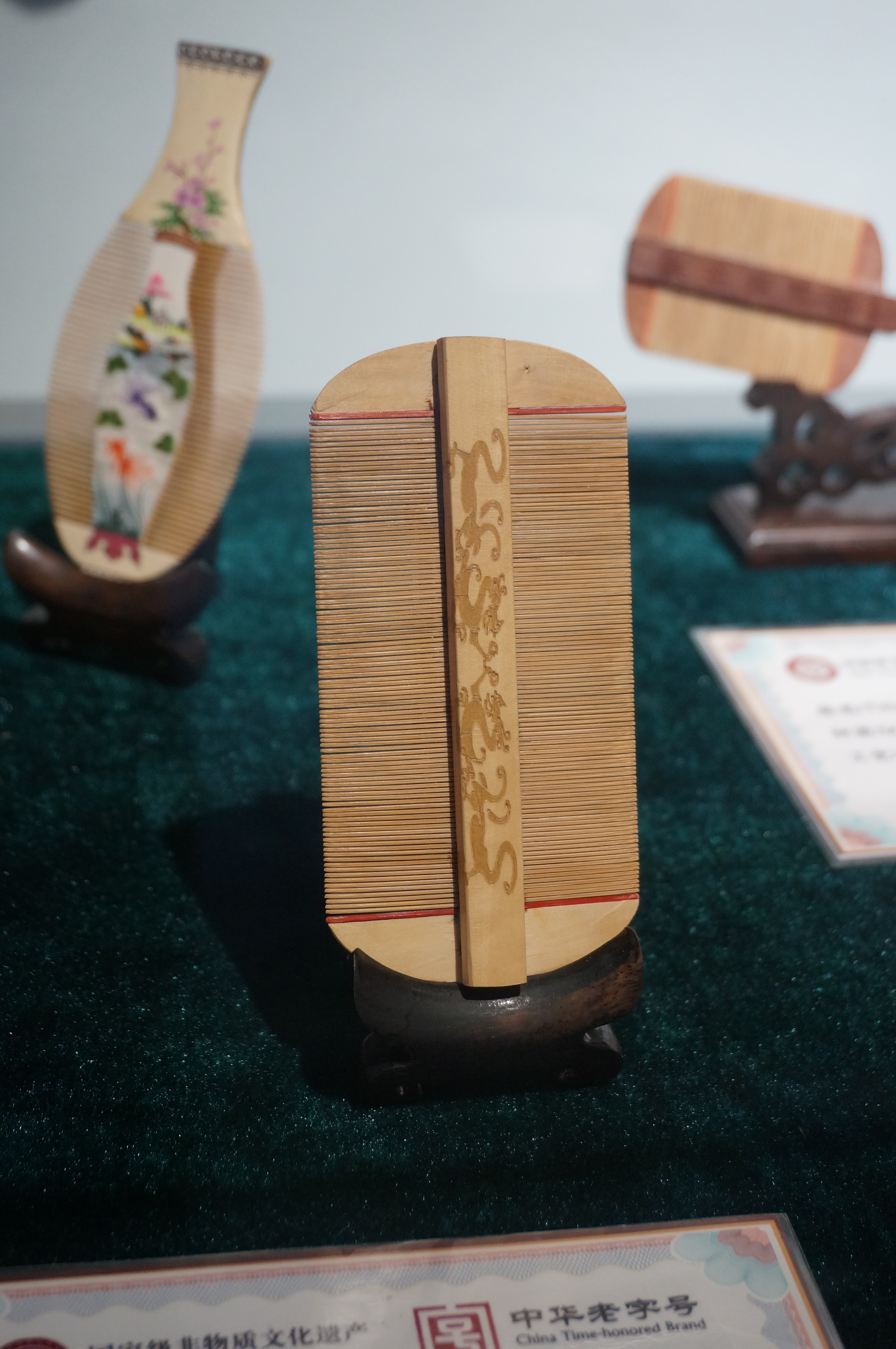
Changzhou comb, double-edged fine-toothed comb

=== Japanese combs ===
In Japan, combs are referred to as kushi. Indigenous Japanese kushi started to be used by Japanese people about 6000 years ago in the Jōmon era. In the Nara period, Chinese combs from the Tang dynasty were introduced in Japan. Another form of comb in Japan is the Satsuma comb, which started to appear around the 17th century and was produced by the samurai warriors of the Satsuma clan as a side job. Traditional Japanese hairstyles (Nihon gami) are practically impossible to style without combs.

Boxwood combs (a common material for kushi) are unique as they do not generate static electricity, and are gentle to the skin. The amber hue becomes richer and more attractive with repeated use.

Combs for traditional Japanese hairstyles can be categorized into tategushi (vertical combs) and yokogushi (horizontal combs), and each style has their own purpose and durability. Furthermore, combs may be decorative and used as hair ornaments, as was common during the Edo period when ornamental combs became very common.

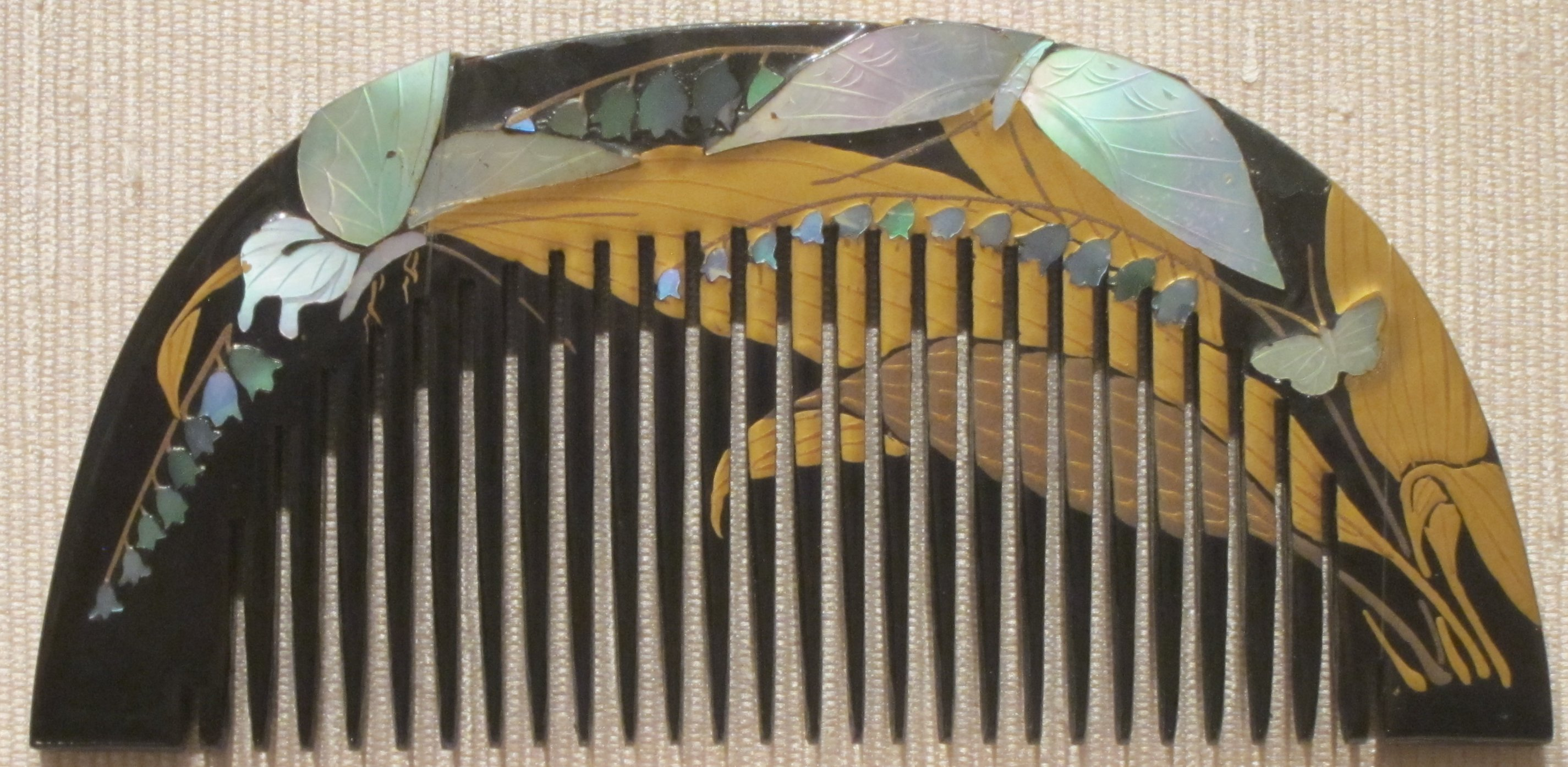
Kushi made of tortoiseshell with lacquer, Japan, Edo or Taiso period

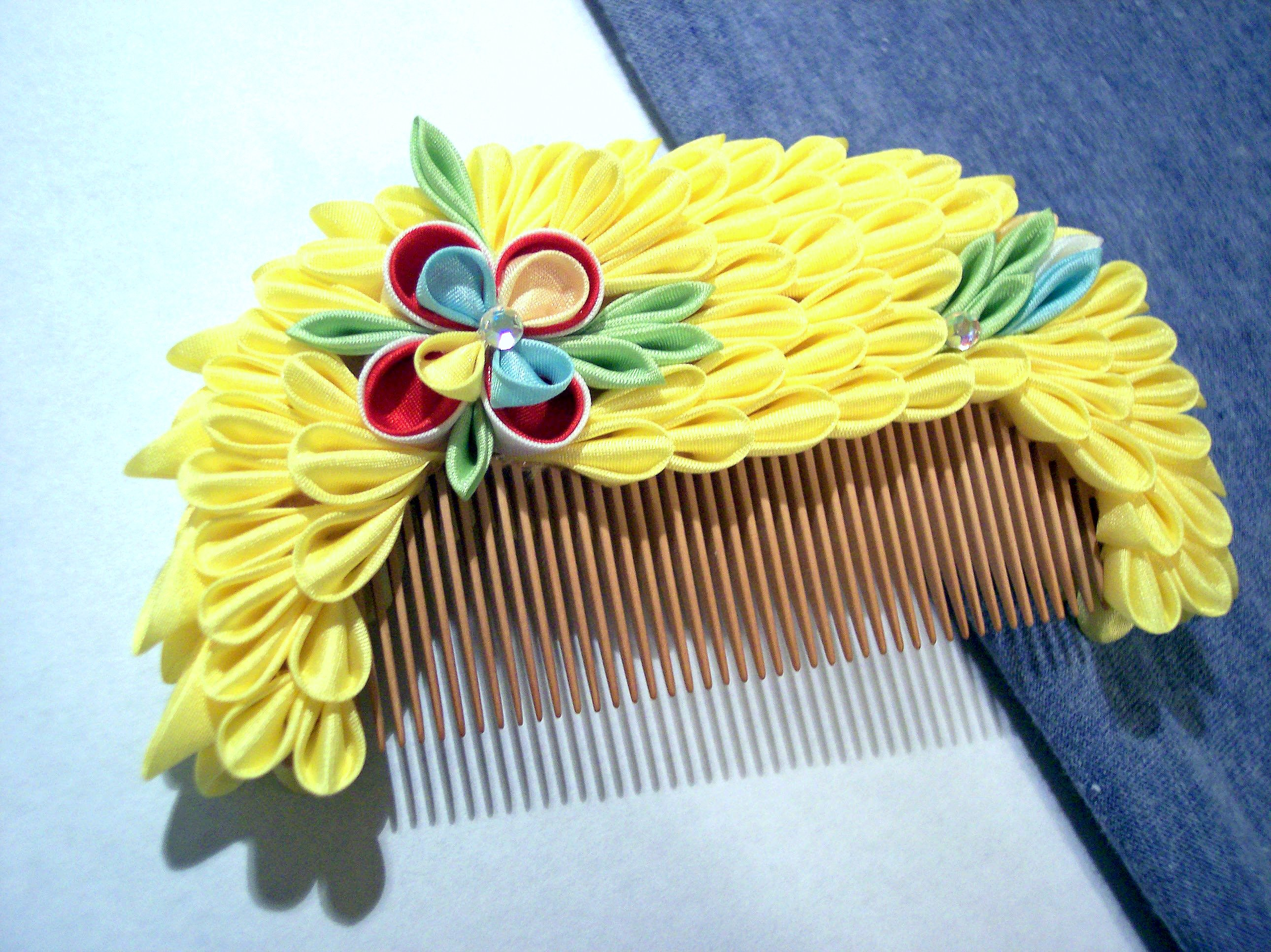
Hana kushi

=== Liturgical comb ===
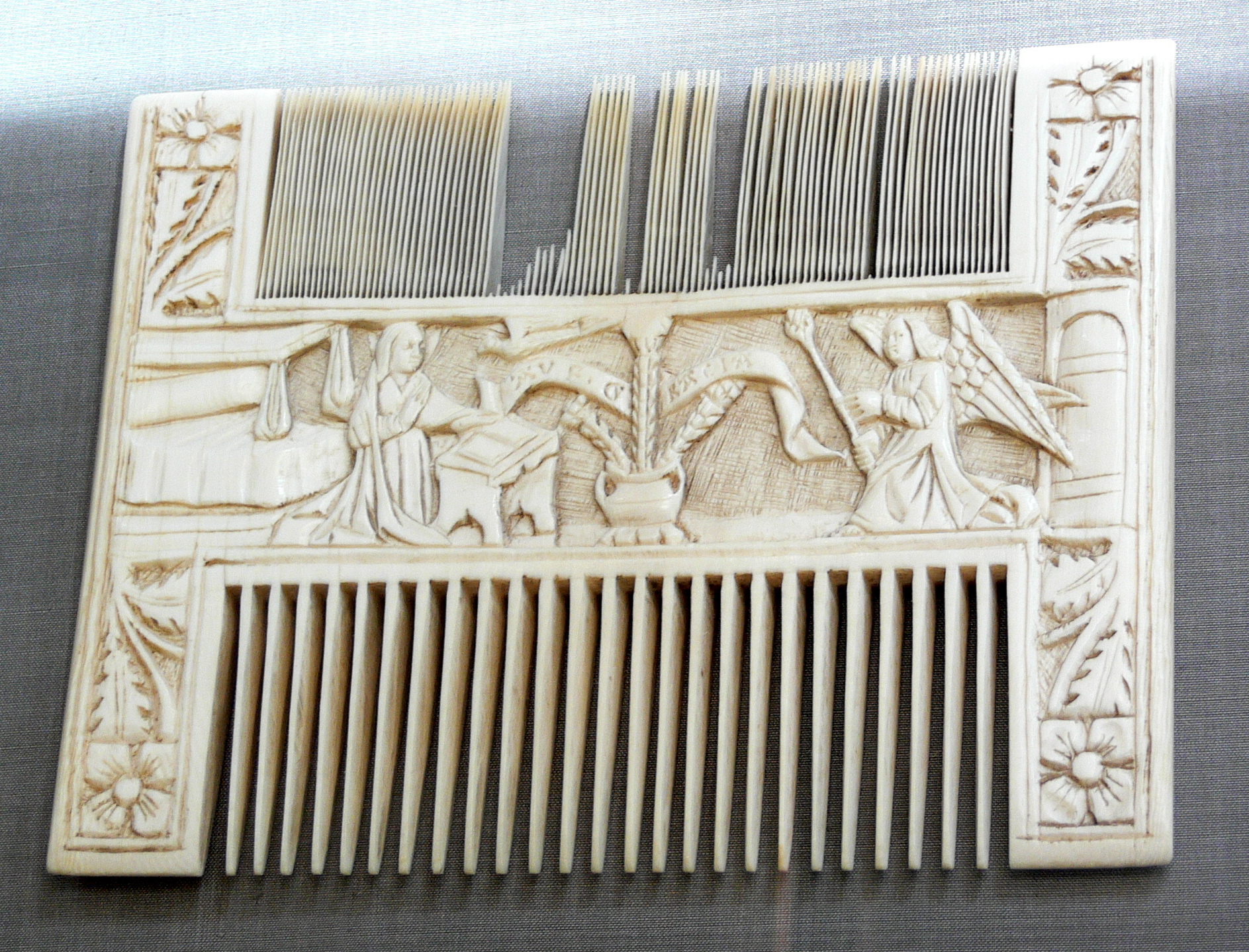
A liturgical comb, possibly made in Italy, 15th century

A liturgical comb is a decorated comb used ceremonially in both Catholic and Orthodox Christianity during the Middle Ages, and in Byzantine Rite up to this day.

=== Nit comb ===
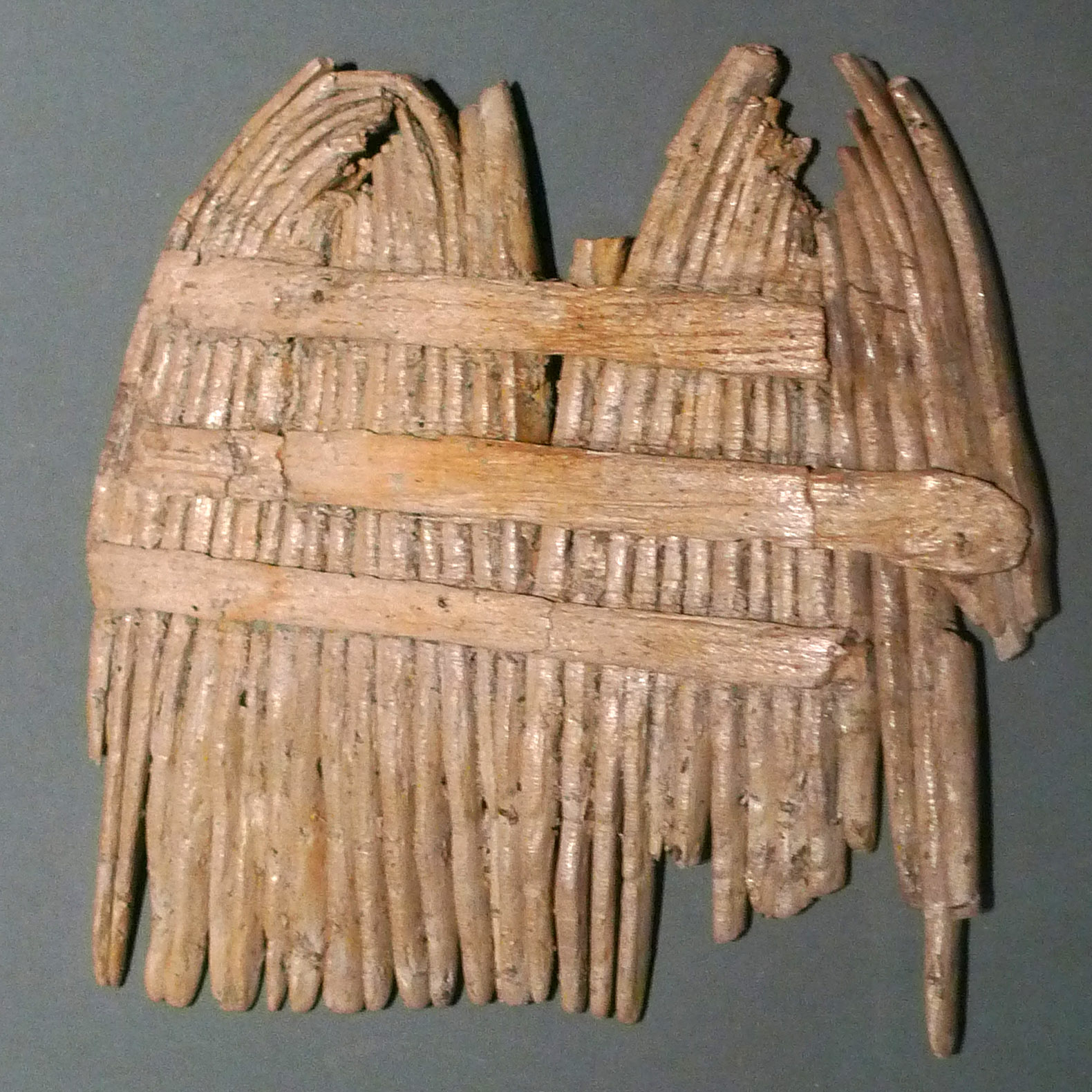
Nit comb, made of bent twigs, Sutz-Lattrigen, around 2700 BC

Specialized combs such as "flea combs" or "nit combs" can be used to remove macroscopic parasites and cause them damage by combing. A comb with teeth fine enough to remove nits is sometimes called a "fine-toothed comb", as in the metaphoric usage "go over [something] with a fine-toothed comb", meaning to search closely and in detail. Sometimes in this meaning, "fine-toothed comb" has been reanalysed as "fine toothcomb" and then shortened to "toothcomb", or changed into forms such as "the finest of toothcombs".

=== Afro pick ===
An Afro pick is a type of comb having long, thick teeth which is usually used on kinky or Afro-textured hair. It is longer and thinner than the typical comb, and it is sometimes worn in the hair.

Afro picks

The history of the Afro pick dates back at least 5,000 years, as a practical tool that may also have cultural and political meaning.

=== Unbreakable plastic comb ===
An unbreakable plastic comb is a comb that, despite being made of plastic rather than (more expensive) metal, does not shatter into multiple pieces if dropped on a hard surface such as bathroom tiles, a hardwood floor, or pavement. Such combs were introduced in the mid-twentieth century. Today, most plastic combs are unbreakable, as advancements in plastic manufacturing have continuously improved the durability of the material. However it is of importance to note that though cheap and easily available, plastic combs are harmful to nature and is damaging to hair over time. They generate static electricity and may even disrupt the hair cuticle creating frizz and increasing hair damage.

=== Modern artisan combs ===
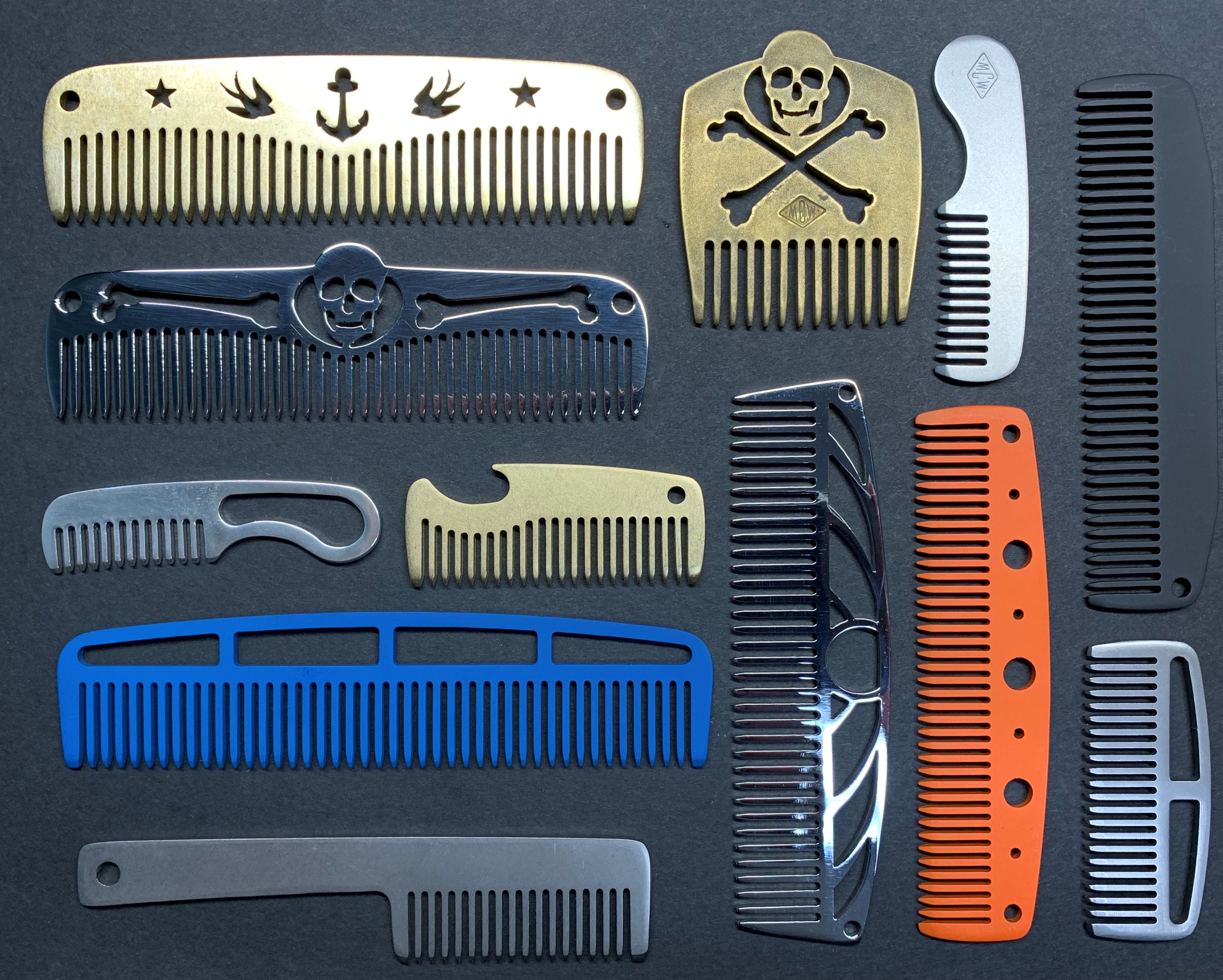
Modern artisan metal combs crafted from brass, stainless steel, titanium and sterling silver

Modern artisan combs crafted from a wide variety of new and recycled materials have become popular over recent years. Used skateboard decks, vinyl records, brass, titanium alloy, acrylic, sterling silver, and exotic wood are a few of the materials being used.

=== French side combs ===
Some hair combs are designed to be used similarly to hairpins, to hold hair away from the face, or in updos. Shorter ones may be worn in hair on the side of the head, or to accessorize a bun. Longer ones may be purpose-made to hold up specific hairstyles, such as the French twist.

== Gallery ==
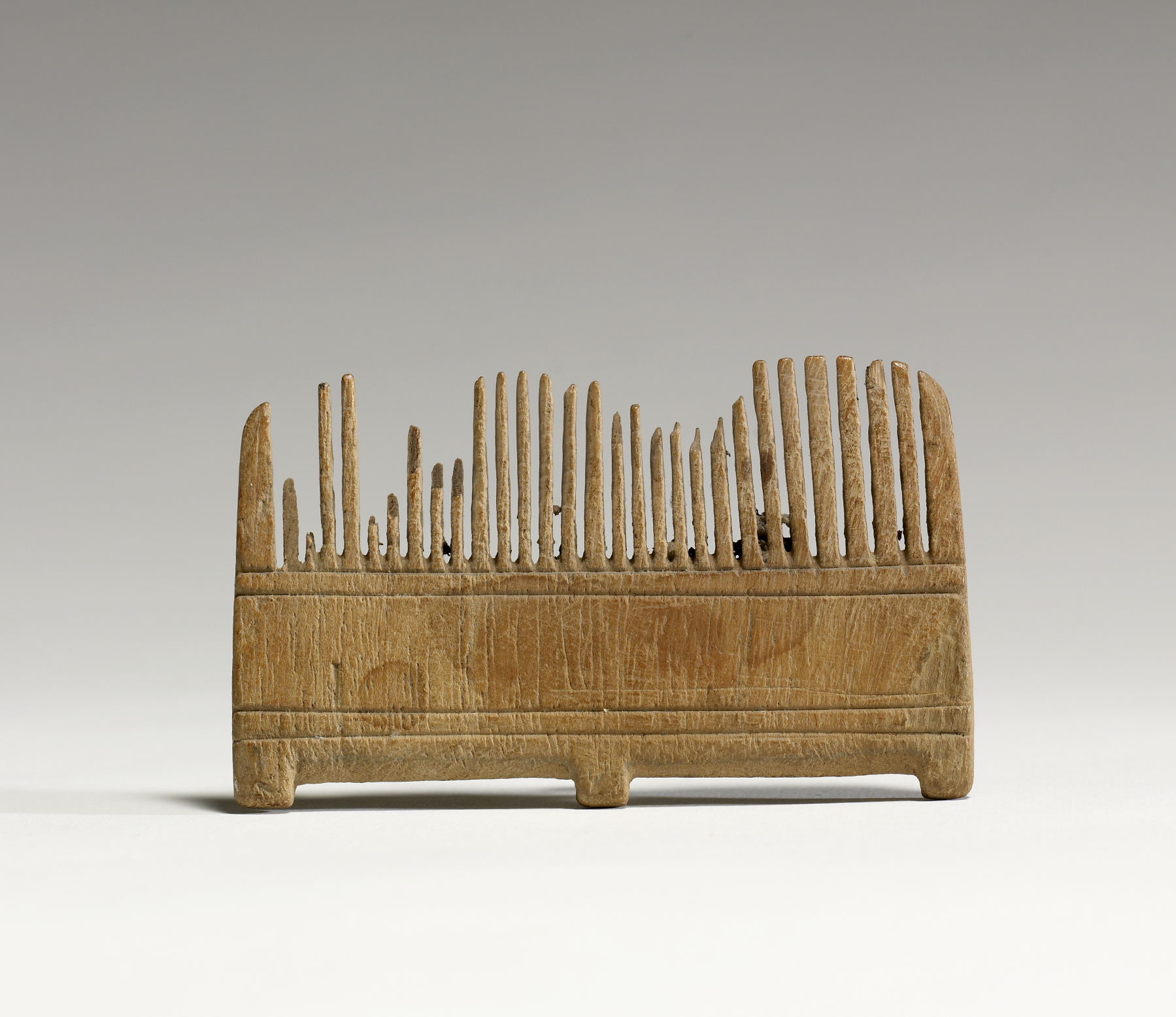
Ancient Egyptian comb, c. fifteenth century BC

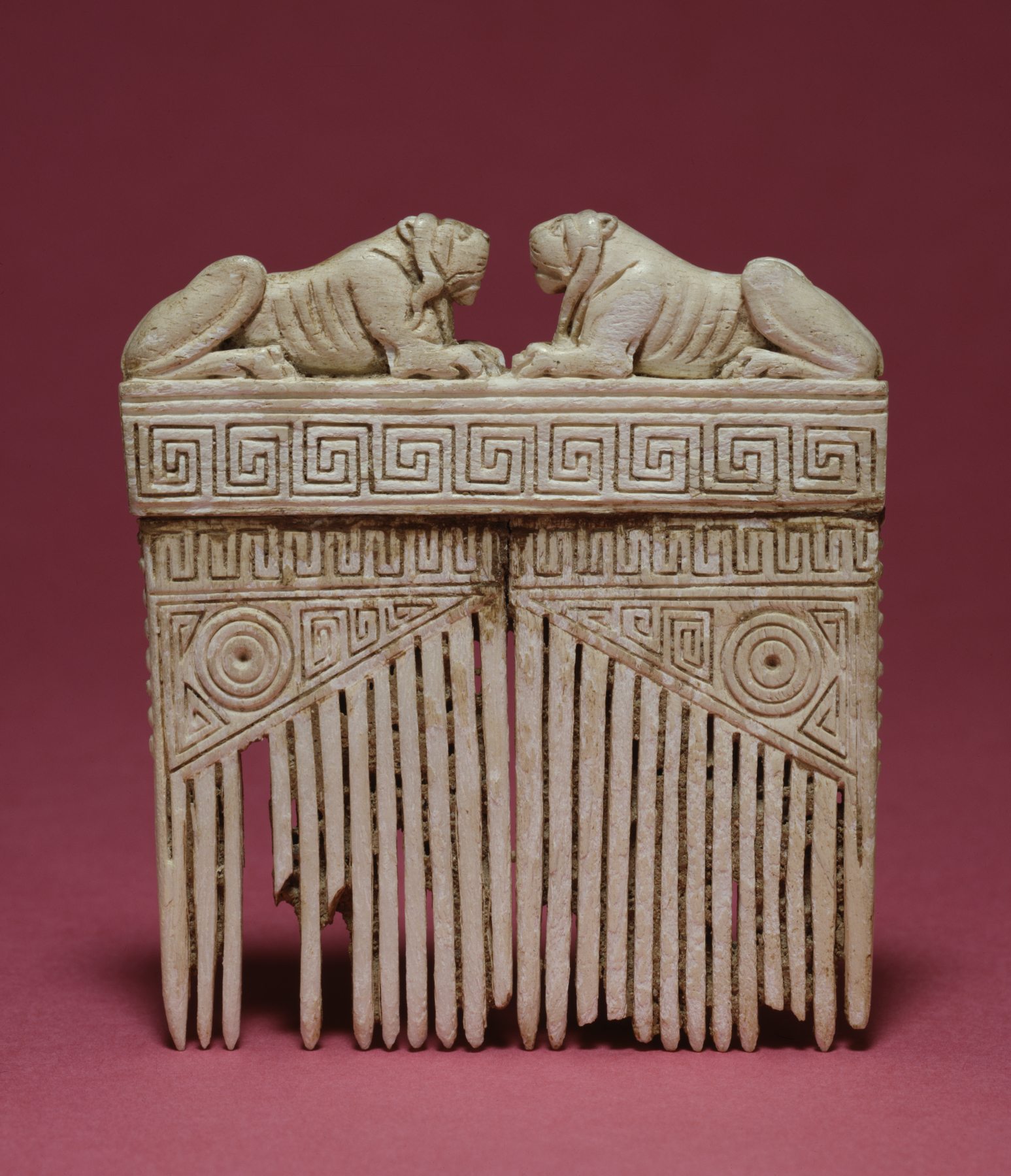
Etruscan comb, c. seventh century BC

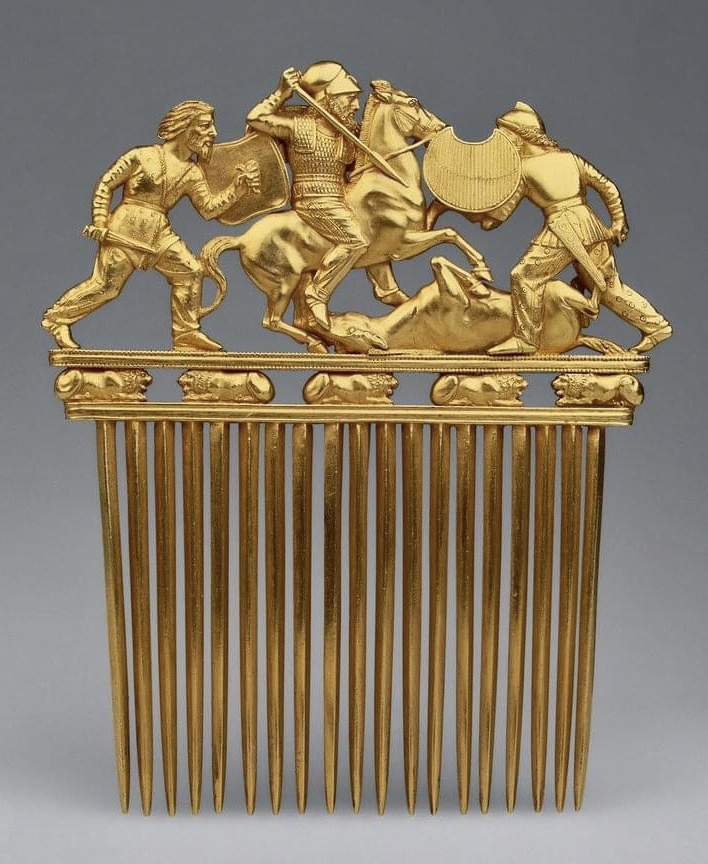
Scythian comb, c. 400 BC

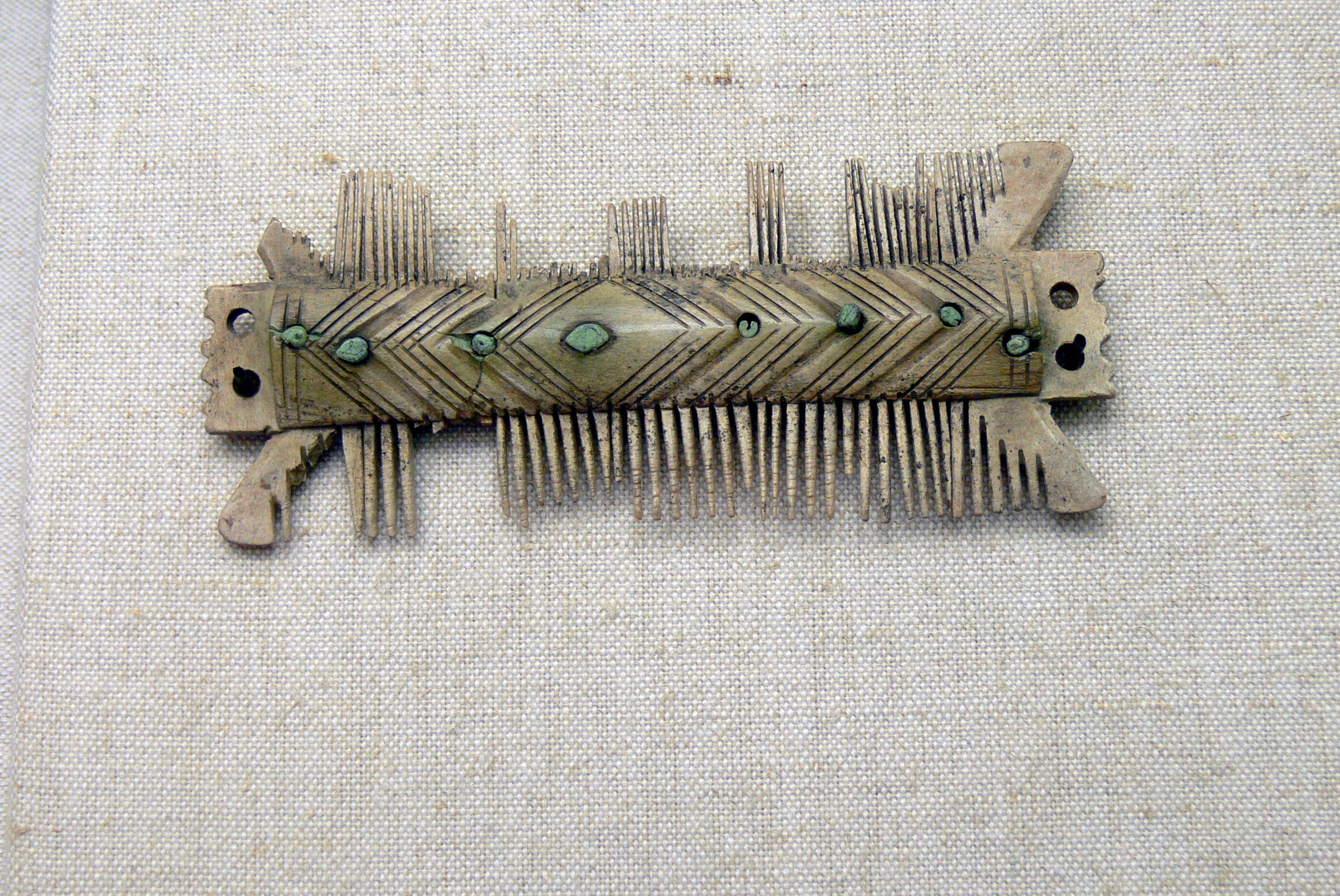
Ancient Roman comb, 4th or 5th century AD

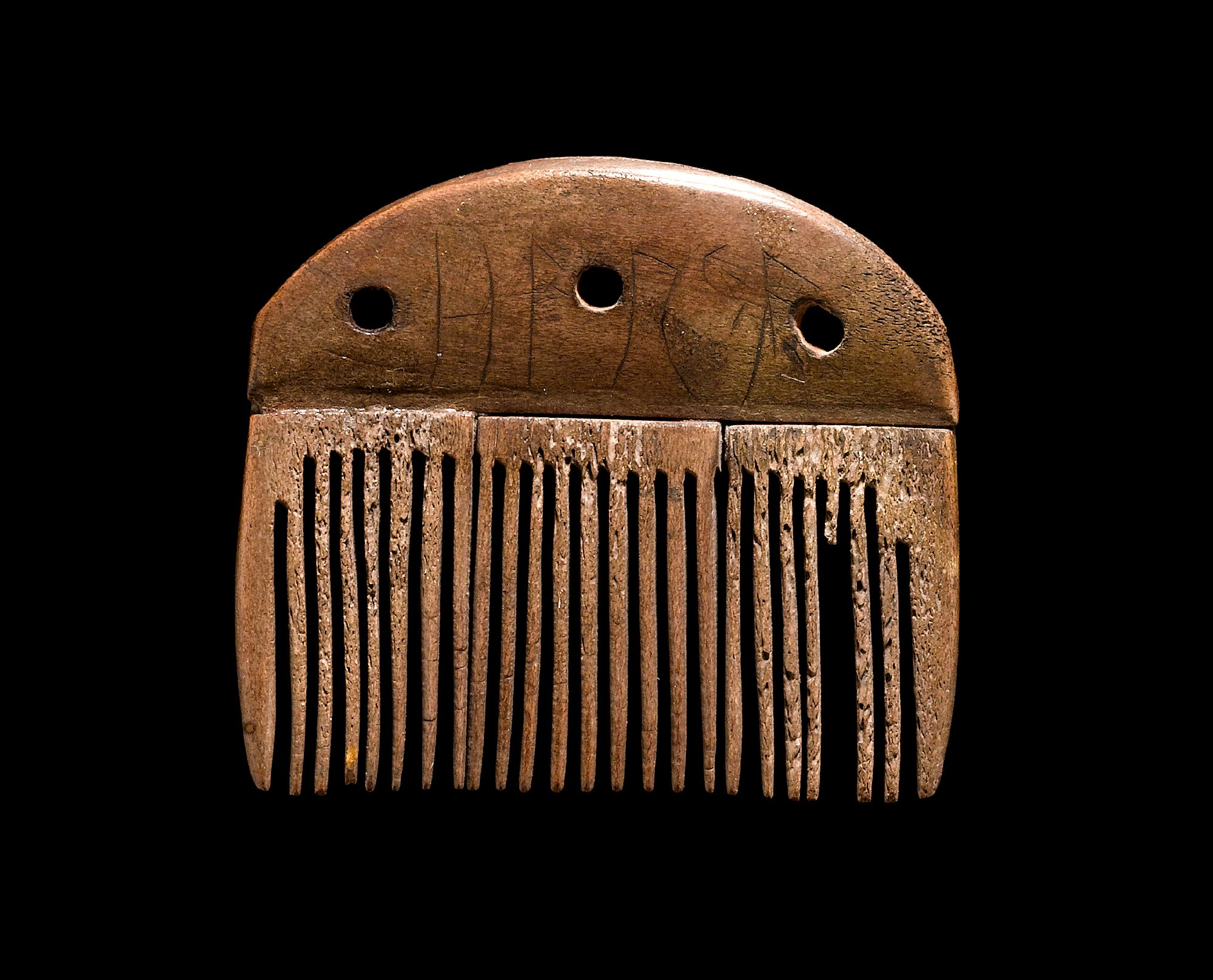
The world's oldest runic inscription (160 AD) on the Vimose comb, Denmark

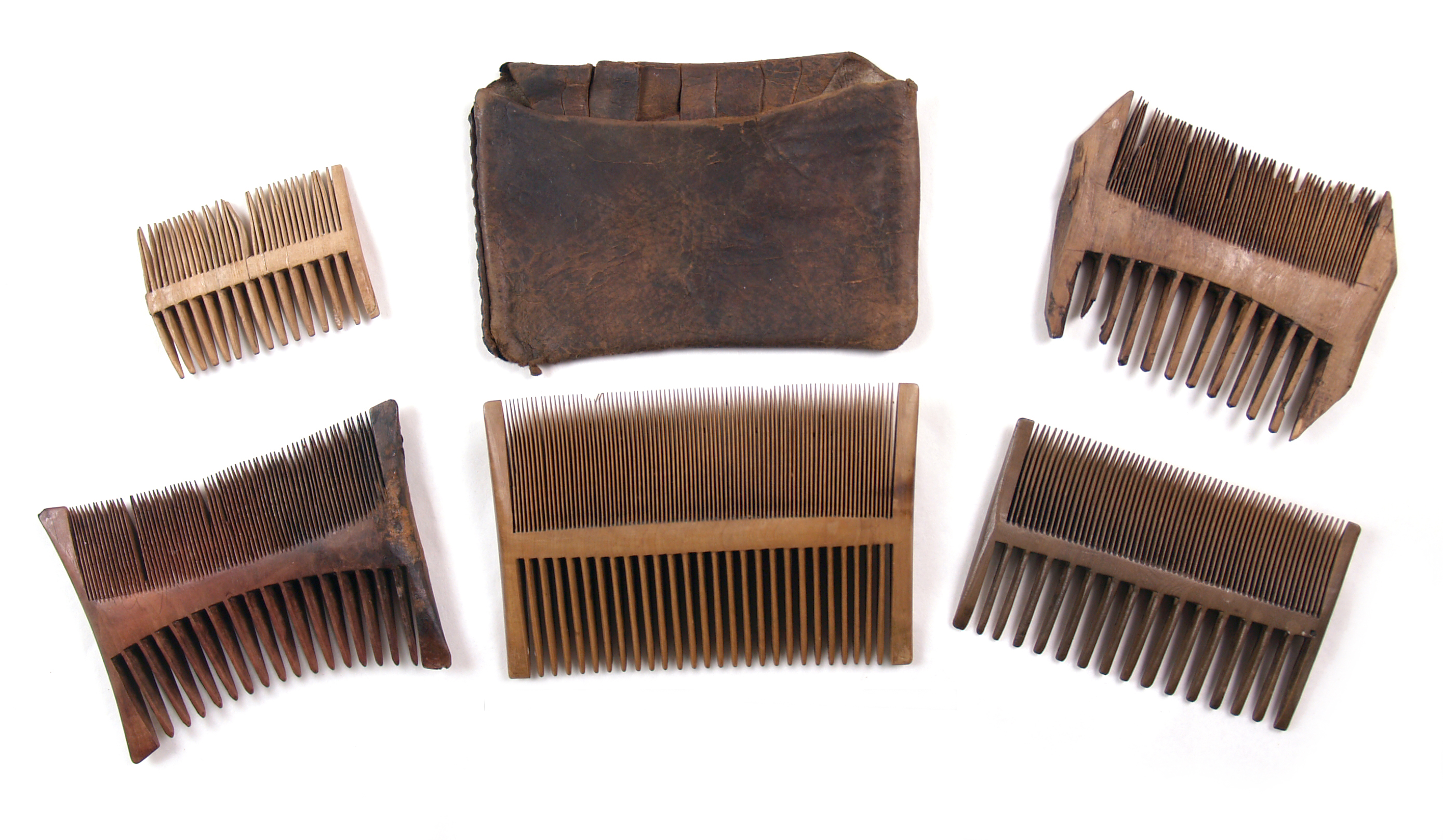
A set of combs found on the 16th-century ship Mary Rose

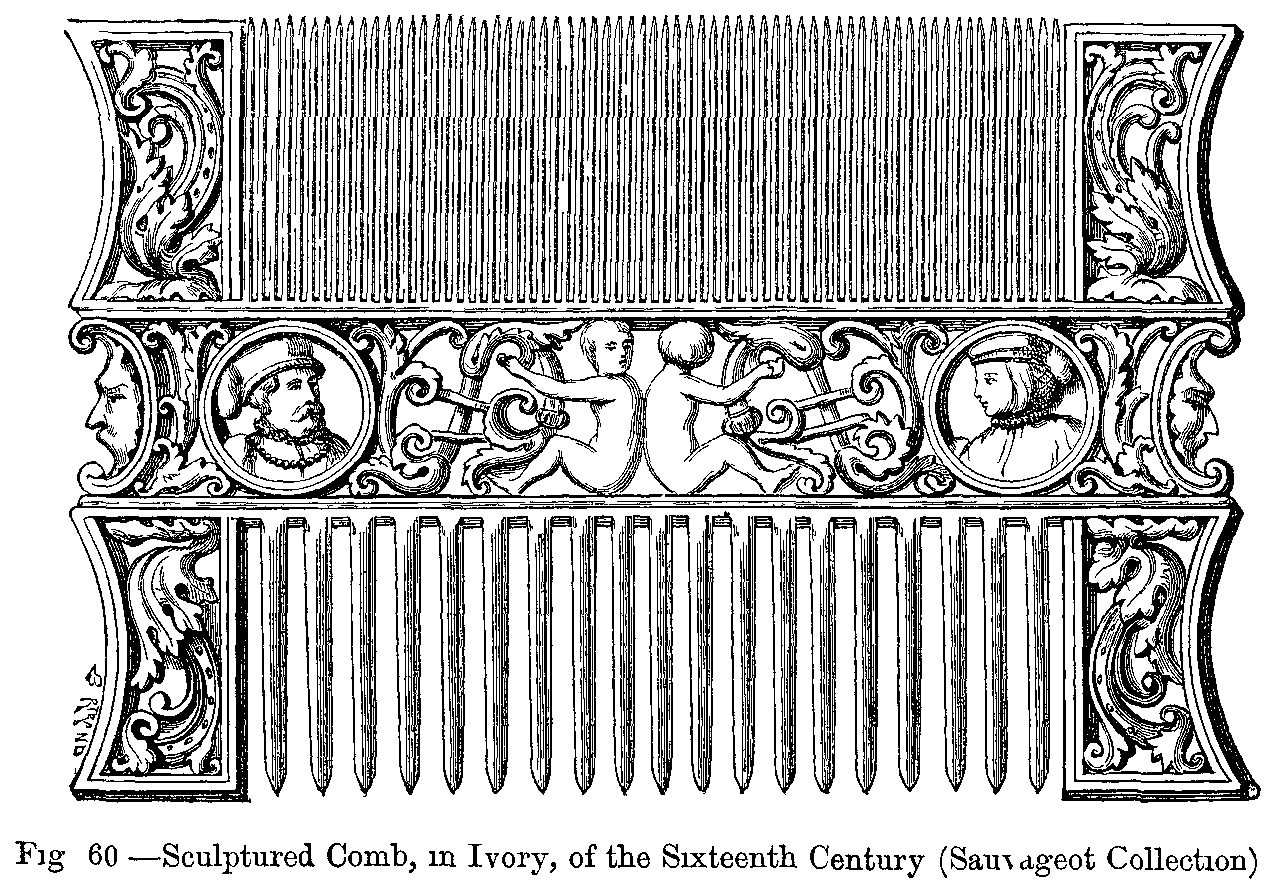
Ivory sculptured comb, 16th century

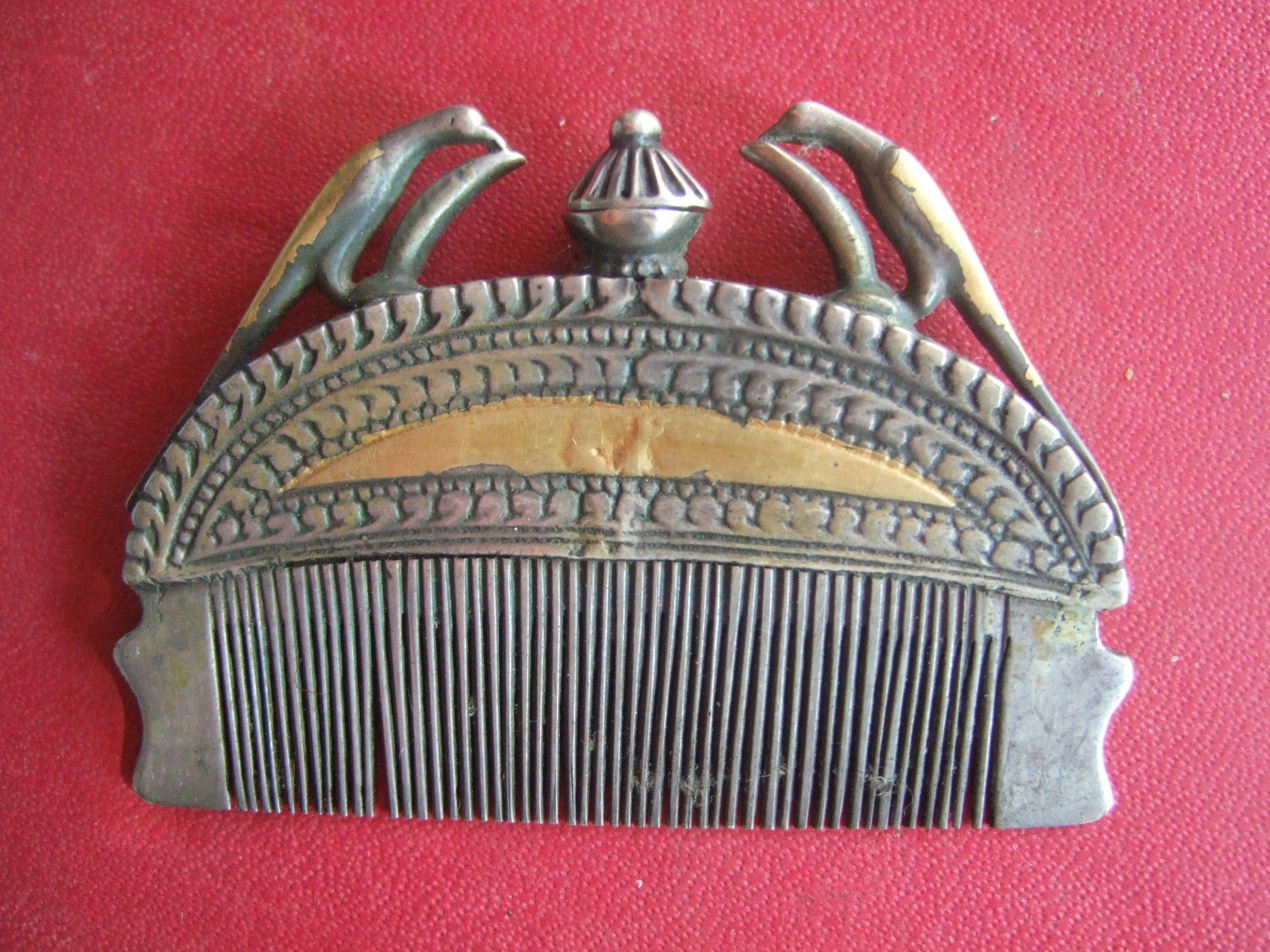
Indian metal comb for keeping hair in place, adorned with a pair of birds. After removing the central stopper, perfume can be poured into the opening in order to moisten the teeth of the comb and the hair of the wearer.

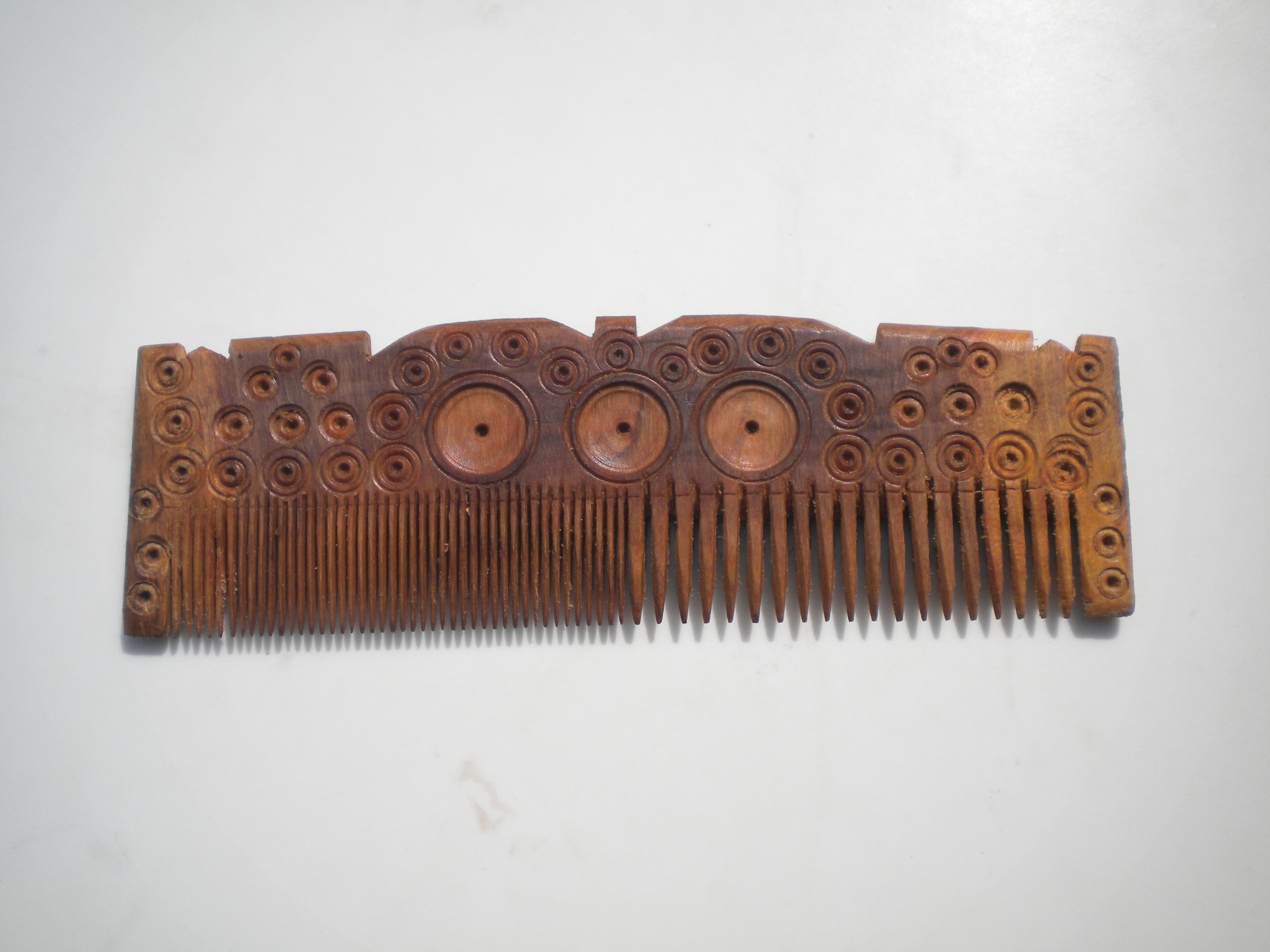
A Punjabi wooden comb

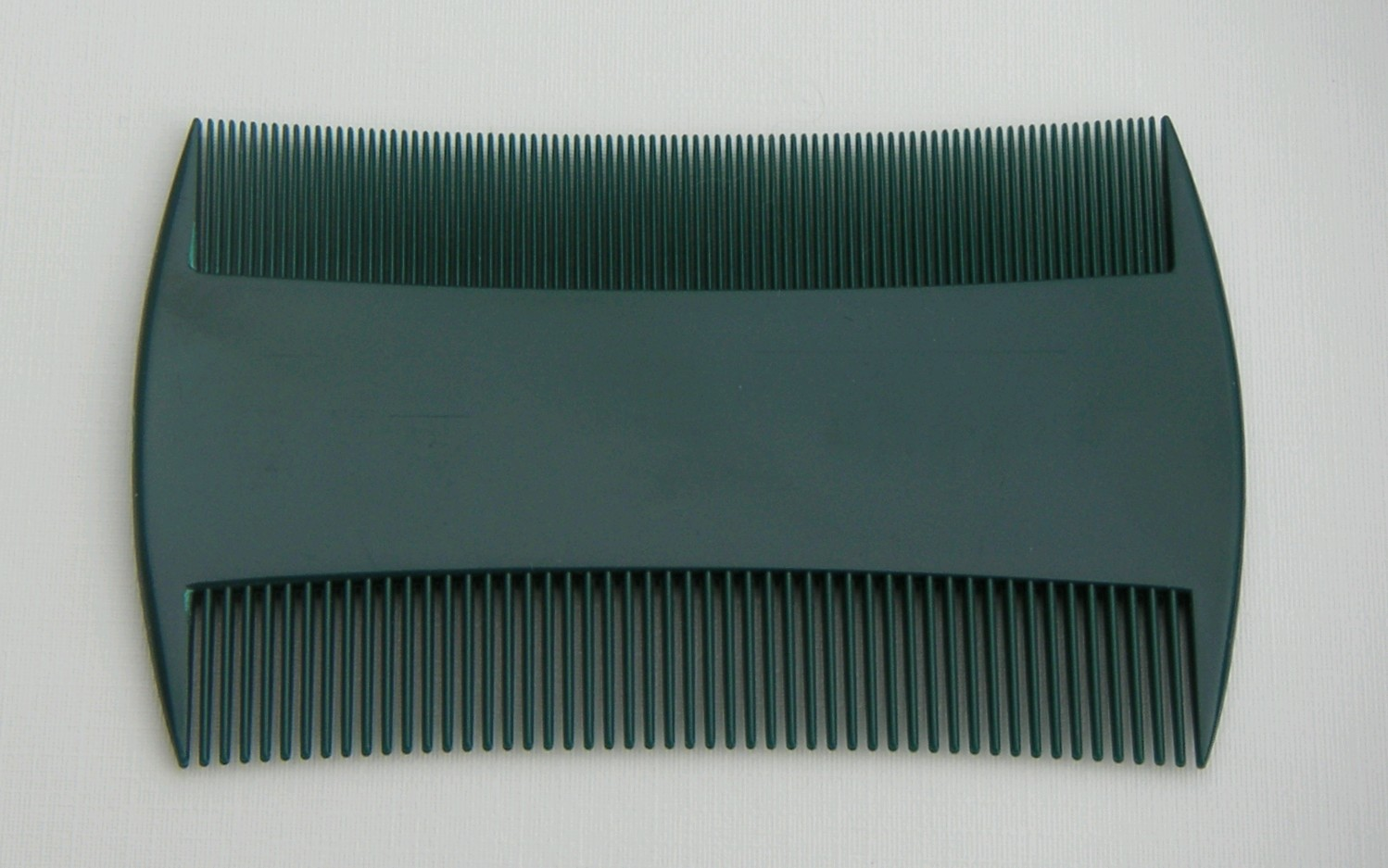
Head louse comb

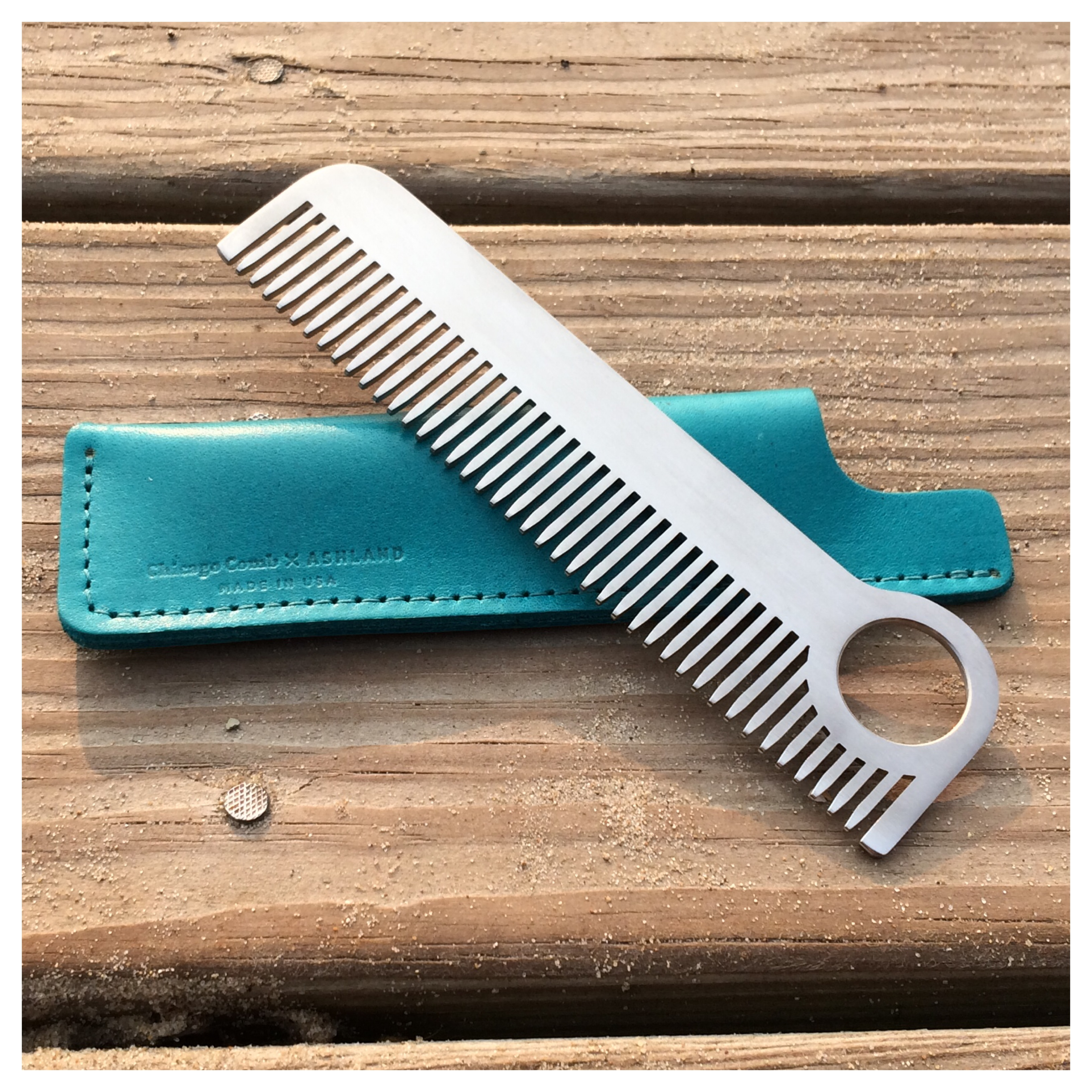
Artisan hand-finished metal comb

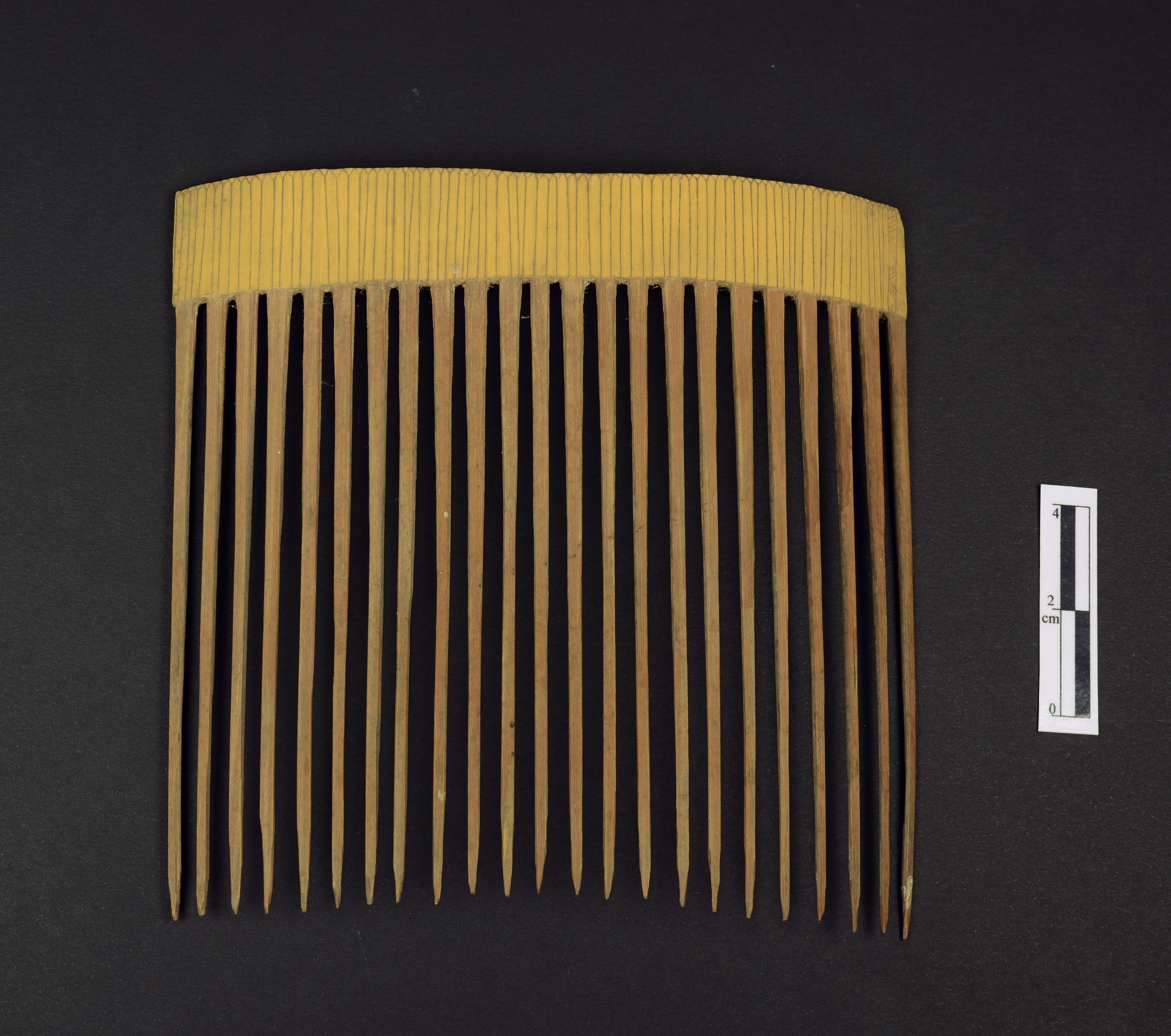
Bamboo comb of the Kanak people

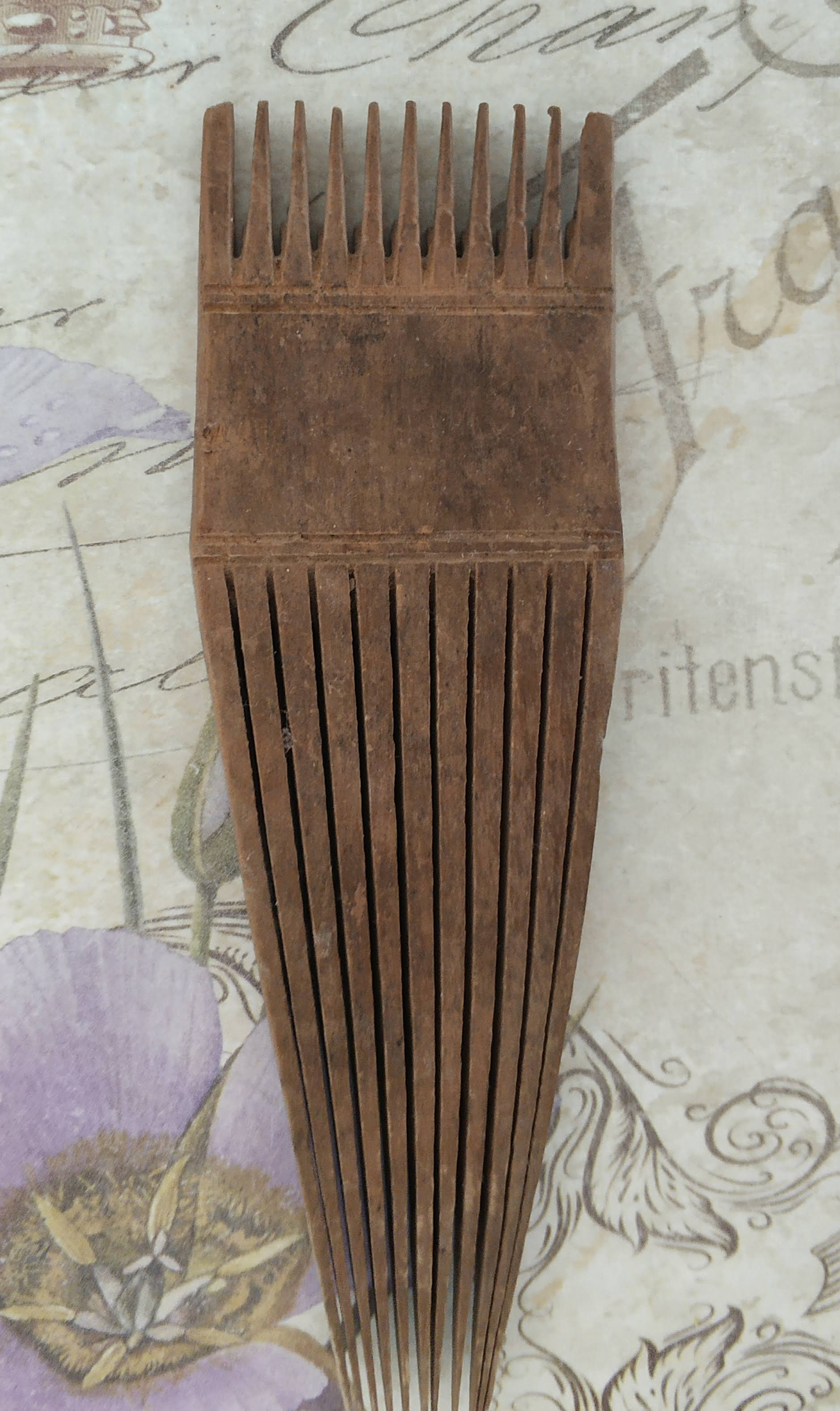
Wooden comb in Nepal.

== See also ==
- Hairbrush
- Razor
- Uncombable hair syndrome
