= Auburn Correctional Facility =

Maximum-security state prison in New York, US

- Interactive map of Auburn Correctional Facility
- Location: 135 State Street Auburn, New York, US; 42°56′05″N 76°34′27″W
- Status: Open
- Security class: Maximum security
- Capacity: 1,821
- Opened: 1818
- Managed by: New York State Department of Corrections and Community Supervision
- Director: Thomas Napoli (superintendent)
- Website: Official website

Auburn Correctional Facility is a state prison on State Street in Auburn, New York, United States. It was built on land that was once a Cayuga village. It is classified as a maximum security facility.

== History ==
In 1816, assemblyman John H. Beach lobbied New York State to make the town of Auburn the site for a new prison. Beach and his colleagues secured the contract for the town of Auburn, and sold a plot of land to the state of New York on the north bank of the Owasco Outlet for the prison to be built. Constructed in 1816 as Auburn Prison, it was the second state prison in New York (after New York City's Newgate, 1797–1828), the site of the first execution by electric chair in 1890, and the namesake of the "Auburn system," a correctional system in which prisoners were housed in solitary confinement in large rectangular buildings, and forced to participate in penal labor under silence that was enforced at all times. Auburn's role in introducing the electric chair contributed greatly to the historicity of the prison as it was soon adopted by many other prisons for being considered more humane than hanging, despite initial controversy. At the time of the prison's founding, it was the town of Auburn's largest structure. The prison was renamed the Auburn Correctional Facility in 1970. The prison is among the oldest functional prisons in the United States.

In its early years, the prison charged a fee to tourists in order to raise funds for the prison. Eventually, to discourage most visitors, the fee was increased. In the 1840s, adult tourists paid twenty-five cents, whereas the children's admittance fee was half the price. Tourists would be escorted through the prison's factory floors and observe prisoners at work directly, or escorted through tunnels, and remain out of sight, allowing tourists to watch prisoners while they labored. The Auburn Prison attracted enormous amounts of tourists in the middle of the nineteenth century, which added to the town's local economy and service industries.

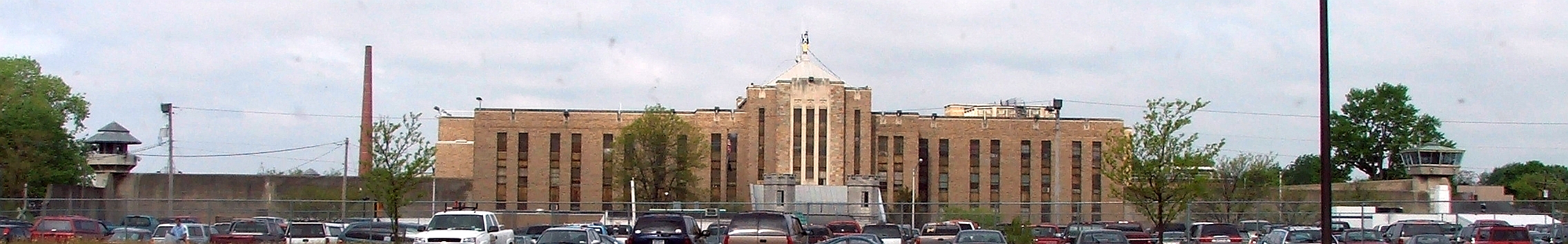
The current front of Auburn Prison. Note the two guard towers on either side and Copper John on top

=== Auburn system ===
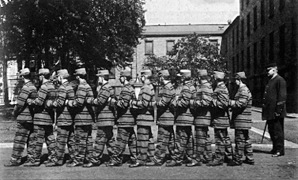
Lockstep in the Auburn Prison

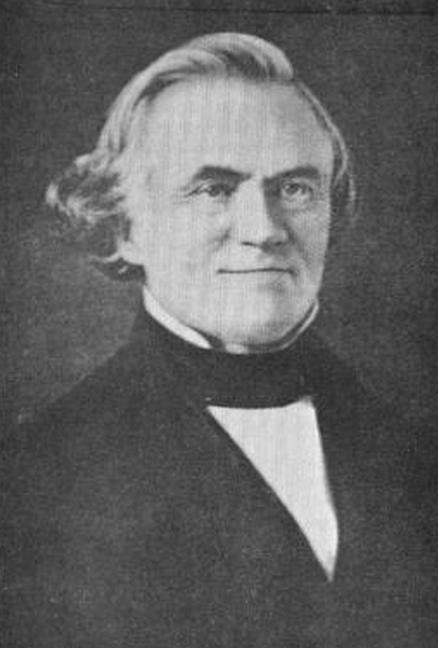
Elam Lynds, the first warden of the Auburn Penitentiary, is credited with creating the "Auburn (or Congregate) system."

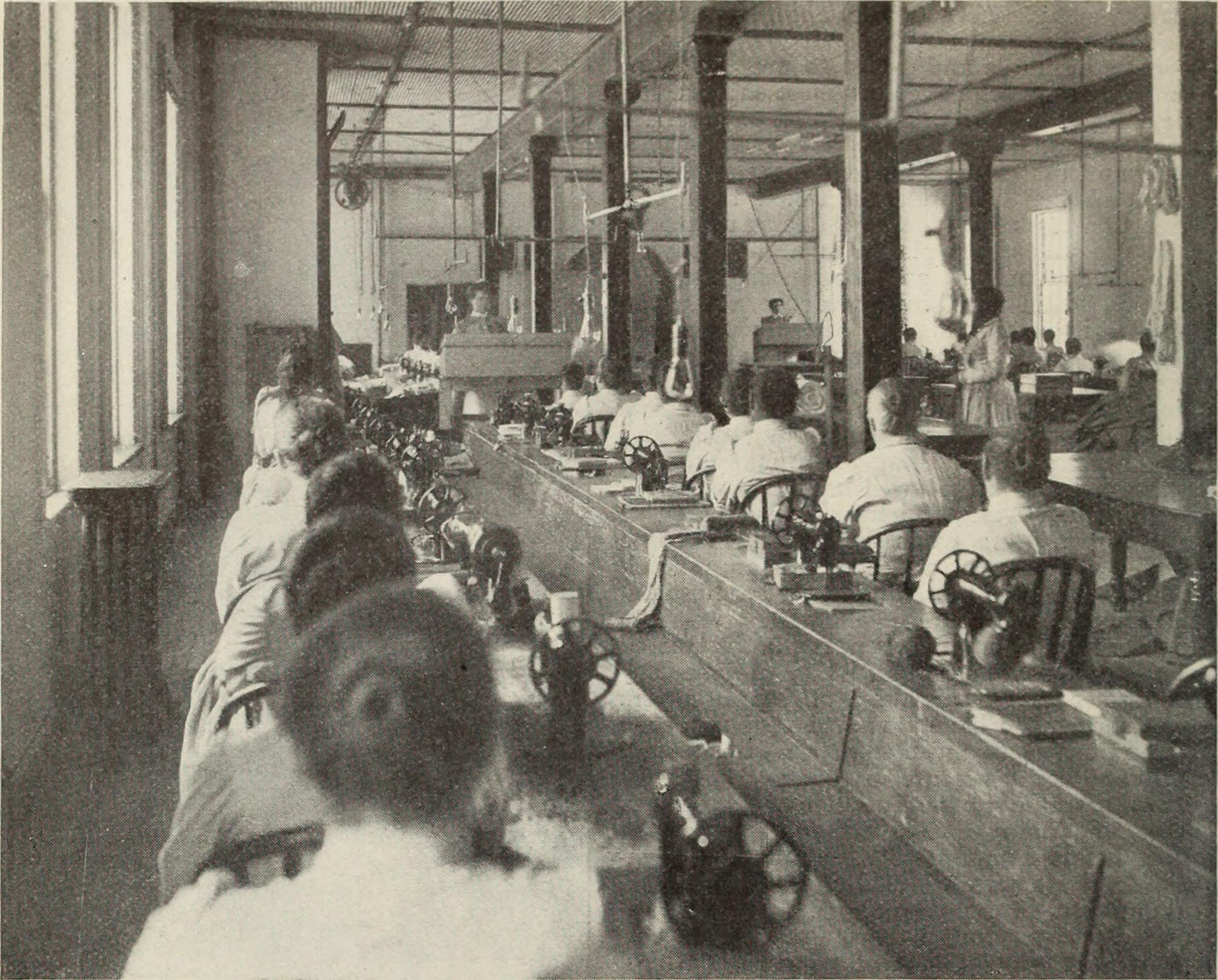
Female prisoners in Auburn's workshop

In contrast with the purely reformatory type prison instituted in Pennsylvania, the Philadelphia System introduced by the Quakers, the "Auburn system" modified the schedule of prayer, contemplation, and humane conditions with hard labor.

Prisoners were compelled to work during the day, and the profit of their labor helped to support the prison. The contract labor system of Auburn Prison was very financially useful to the state, producing large amounts of money, especially from the manufacturing of shoes and textiles in the 19th century. Prisoners were segregated by offense; additionally they were issued clothing that identified their crime. The traditional American prison uniform, consisting of horizontal black and white stripes, originated at the Auburn prison. The prisoners had their heads closely cropped when they entered the prison. Prisoners' heads, mustaches, and beards would be shaved, then they would be stripped and dunked in water before receiving their prison uniform. Then, the prison clerk questioned each prisoner and recorded their answers in the prison register. Questions included personal information like height, age, place of birth, and family background, but also questions about the charges made against the prisoner. The final step of the intake procedure involved questioning new prisoners about their previous work so they could be assigned to a specific shop within the prison. Once assigned to a shop, prisoners were forced to work, supporting the financial needs of the prison. After the prisoner's intake procedure was complete, and once inside the prison, prisoners were forced to walk in lockstep, keeping step with their heads bowed. Each prisoner placed a hand on the shoulder of the man in front of him to maintain a rigid separation.

There was a communal dining room so that the prisoners could gather together for meals, but a code of silence was enforced harshly at all times by the guards. Thus the inmates worked and ate together, but in complete silence. At night the prisoners were kept in individual cells (even though the original plan called for double cells).

The Auburn System had quite an impressive resonance in the various global prison reform movements and for several decades, this system was adopted by other jurisdictions in Massachusetts, Ohio, and even as far as England and Canada adopted similar practices. This system was also called the "Congregate System." The Sing Sing Correctional Facility, also in New York, was built using this system under the supervision of the former warden of the Auburn prison, Elam Lynds.

As of 2010, Auburn Correctional Facility is responsible for the manufacturing of New York State's license plates.

=== Riots and uprisings ===
Auburn has "a long history of controversy, scandal, and riot."

It has been the site of several notable riots over the years, including November 1820 and a race-related riot in 1921. The most serious were two related incidents in the summer and winter of 1929. On July 28, 1929—only a week after a similar incident at Clinton Prison in Dannemora—inmates sprayed acid in an officer’s face and gained access to the prison's armory. Prison shops were set on fire, six buildings were destroyed, and four prisoners escaped. Two inmates were killed and one wounded, and five officers were injured. Later that year, on December 11, Warden Edgar Jennings and six guards were taken hostage by a group of inmates, some of whom had obtained guns in the July riot and concealed them in the interim. This uprising caused the death of Principal Keeper George A. Durnford as well as eight prisoners. Three inmates were later charged, convicted, and executed at Sing Sing for their roles in the riots.

On November 4, 1970, inmates succeeded in seizing control of the facility and held 50 people, including guards and outside construction workers, hostage for more than eight hours. The incident was attributed to increasing racial tensions and to prisoners' rights being violated.

=== Copper John ===
Copper John as he is today

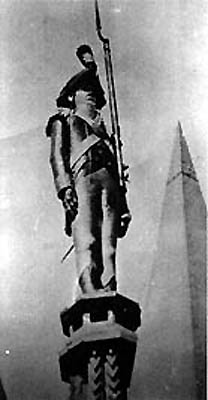
The original Copper John

Copper John is a statue of an American Revolutionary War soldier that stands atop the Auburn Correctional Facility. It has entered the local lexicon as a reference to the prison and aspects of it, for example, getting sent to Auburn Prison is "going to work for Copper John."

"John" was originally a wooden statue that was erected atop the administration office of the prison in 1821. In 1848, the statue had weathered so much that it was taken down and a new statue was made out of copper by the prisoners in the prison foundry. In 2004, the New York state government became aware that the statue was fashioned to be "anatomically correct" and ordered the statue to be "incorrected". Some correctional officers made an impromptu protest by passing out T-shirts showing the iconic statue and reading "Save Copper John's Johnson"; but the statue was nonetheless removed, his penis was filed off, and remounted in August.

== Wardens/superintendents ==
The warden was an administrative position appointed by the New York State Commissioner of Correction. Currently, the heads of all New York State correctional facilities are termed "superintendent".

- William Britten (warden) (?–1821) 1816–1821. He was a master carpenter and builder of the prison. He became the first warden.
- Elam Lynds (1784–1855) 1821–1825 (first term). He was also a principal keeper.
- Gershom Powers (1789-1831) 1825–?.
- Levi Lewis (warden) 1834–1836.
- John Garrow (warden) 1836–1838.
- Elam Lynds (1784–1855) 1838–1839 (second term).
- Noyes Palmer 1839–1840.
- Robert Cook (warden) 1840–1843.
- Matthew R. Bartlett 1867–1869, 1.5 executions.
- W. F. Doubleday 1843–1845.
- Hiram Rathbun 1845–1846.
- David Foot (warden) 1846–1848.
- Edward L. Porter 1848–1849.
- James E. Tyler 1849–1851.
- Thomas Kirkpatrick (warden) ? – 1862 (warden).
- William Sunderlin 1851–1886.
- Charles F. Durston July 1887 – May 1893, 2 executions.
- James C. Stout (1843-1901) May 1, 1893 – February 1, 1897, 5 executions.
- J. Warren Mead February 1, 1897 – February 1, 1905, 14 executions.
- Charles K. Baker (acting) February 1, 1905 – December 15, 1905, 1 execution.
- George W. Benham December 15, 1905 – May 26, 1913, 24 executions.
- Charles F. Rattigan May 26, 1913 – May 1, 1916, 9 executions.
- Brigadier General Edgar S. Jennings 1929.
- Frank Lamar Christian 1929 (acting warden) following riots in December 1929.
- John L. Hoffman 1930. He had a heart attack while in office and retired.
- Frank L. Heacox (1876–1953) 1930 (acting warden).
- John F. Foster 1944–1950.
- Robert E. Murphy 1950–1963.
- John Deegan (warden) 1969–1971.
- Harry Fritz (warden) 1971–1974.
- Robert J. Henderson 1974–1989. (as warden)
- Hans G. Walker 1989–2002. (as superintendent)
- John W. Burge 2002–2006. (as superintendent)
- Harold D. Graham 2006–2018. (as superintendent).
- Timothy "GAR" McCarthy 2018 – March 10, 2022. (as superintendent)
- Joseph E. Corey March 17, 2022 – 2024. (as superintendent)
- Thomas Napoli 2024 - Present. (as superintendent)

== Principal keepers ==
The principal keeper operated the prison on a day-to-day basis. Many went on to become wardens.

- Elam Lynds (1784–1855) circa 1825.
- Stephen S. Austin (warden) 1860 - 1863.
- George A. Durnford 1929. Killed during a riot by Max Becker.
- Edward L. Beckwith 1930.

== Notable inmates ==
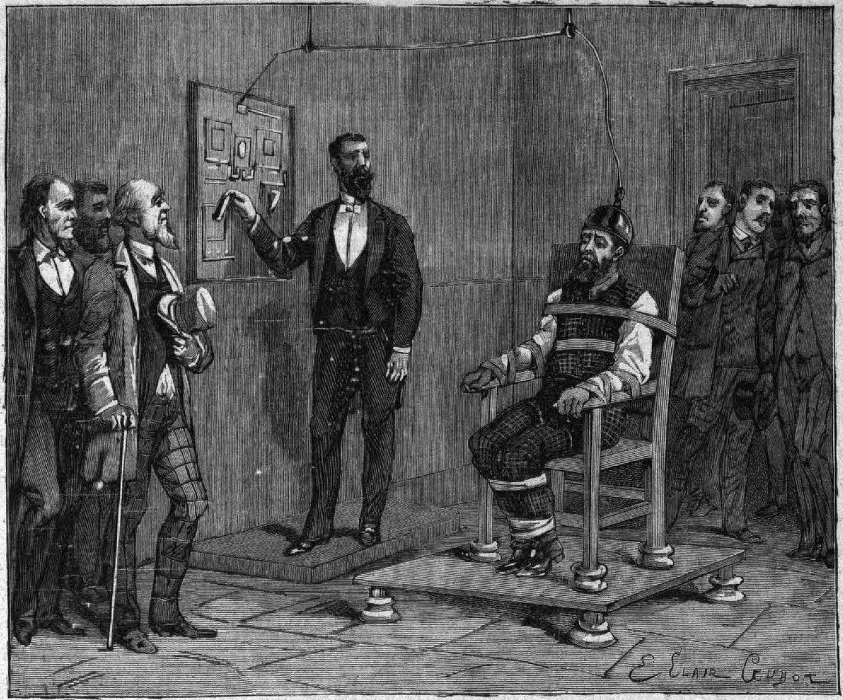
The execution of William Kemmler, August 6, 1890

- Patrick Baxter, serial killer
- Jimmy Burke, Lucchese crime family mob associate
- Robert Chambers, the "preppy murderer"
- Leon Czolgosz, the assassin of President William McKinley, electrocuted in Auburn on October 29, 1901
- Timothy Dean, former police chief of Sunray Texas. Convicted of the murders of Josh Niles and Amber Washburn
- Donald Frankos, contract killer
- Joe Gallo, Colombo crime family caporegime
- Robert F. Garrow: Serial rapist/murderer; transferred to Auburn twice from Clinton Correctional Facility: 1963 while serving for rape conviction, and 1977 while serving for second-degree murder (transferred to Fishkill Correctional Facility in 1978).
- Chester Gillette, convicted for murder of Grace Brown, electrocuted in 1908
- Craig Godineaux, accomplice in the Wendy's Massacre
- Abraham Greenthal, notorious pickpocket; incarcerated 1877-1884, sentence commuted by Governor Grover Cleveland on Friday, May 16, 1884.
- J. Frank Hickey, the Post Card Killer
- William Kemmler, first person executed in the electric chair
- Harold "Kayo" Konigsberg, Mafia hit man from Bayonne NJ
- Robert "Bam Bam" Lawrence, convicted shooter in the murder of Wallie Howard Jr.
- Victor Folke Nelson, sensational prison escapist, author, and mentee of Thomas Mott Osborne
- Austin Reed, the reputed author of the first prison memoir by an African-American
- Matias Reyes, serial rapist sentenced to life in prison
- Tony Sirico, Sopranos actor, Colombo associate
- David Sweat, Dannemora escapee
- Korey Wise, falsely convicted in the Central Park jogger case
