= Society and Prisons: Some Suggestions for a New Penology =

1916 book by Thomas Mott Osborne

Society and Prisons: Some Suggestions for a new Penology
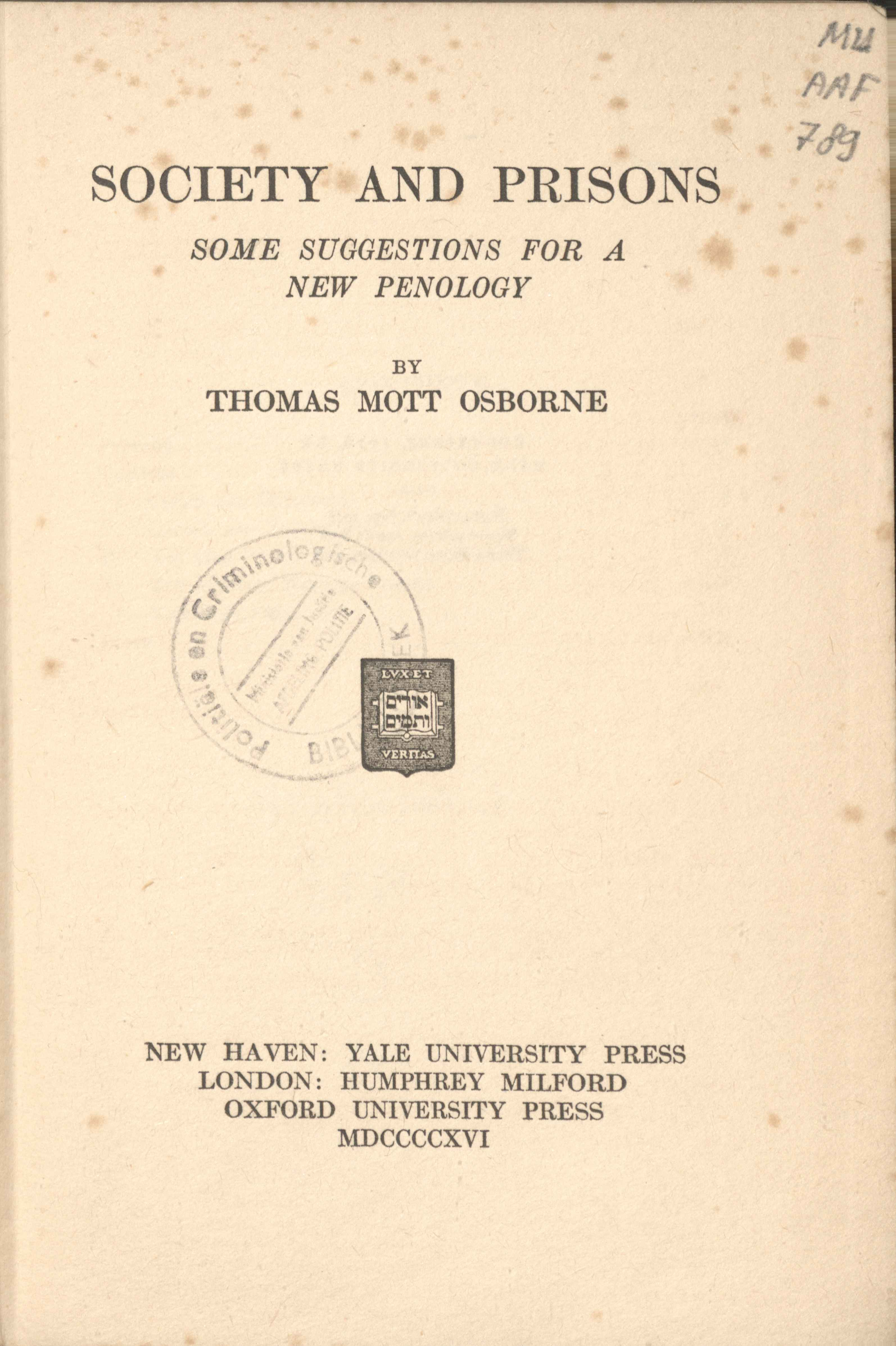
- Title page
- Author: Thomas Mott Osborne
- Language: English
- Publisher: Yale University Press
- Publication date: June 1916
- Publication place: United States

Society and Prisons: Some Suggestions for a New Penology is a book by Thomas Mott Osborne that was first published in 1916 by Yale University Press. In this book, Osborne describes the state of the prison system in the United States and proposes recommendations for prison reform. Drawing on his personal experience as a voluntary prisoner, he discusses the purpose of incarceration, treatment of inmates, and the potential for rehabilitation. The book influenced the discussion of prison reform and contributed to a change in societal perceptions of incarcerated individuals.

== Context ==
=== Thomas Mott Osborne ===
Osborne's family had a history of social activism, including his grandmother, Martha Coffin Wright, and her sister, Lucretia Mott. Osborne graduated with honors from Harvard University in 1884. He was interested in politics and civic affairs and sold the company he inherited from his father to make more time for his political activities in 1903. In 1903, Osborne took office as mayor of the city of Auburn and served two terms. During his time as mayor, he was concerned with society's social and political problems, among which was the increasing prison population and questions about the purpose of incarceration. In 1912, Osborne read My Life in Prison by Donald Lowrie. In his book, Lowrie describes his experiences as a prisoner and displays the inhumane conditions and treatment of prisoners. The book intensified Osborne's interest in prisons and prison reform. In 1913, William Sulzer was elected Governor of New York and planned to reform the state's penal system. Osborne suggested the formation of a prison commission. Sulzer followed this suggestion and offered Osborne the chairmanship of the commission. Osborne accepted and became chairman of the New York Commission on Prison Reform in 1913.

Osborne was determined to investigate and understand the conditions in New York's prisons. He developed the idea of committing himself to prison voluntarily for a short period to gather information. He discussed this idea with friends and concluded that this would enable him to learn things that are impossible to learn any other way. In September 1913, he went through with his idea and voluntarily committed himself to Auburn Prison under the name "Tom Brown" for a week. He requested to be treated like an ordinary prisoner by the guards. During his time as a prisoner, he was exposed to the harsh physical conditions, dehumanizing treatment of prisoners, and the lack of rehabilitation efforts that were common in prisons at this time. The experiment strengthened his conviction of the necessity of reforms. Osborne described the experience in detail in Within Prison Walls, published in 1914. In a discussion with Jack Murphy, a fellow incarcerated person in Auburn prison, they discussed the possibility of giving the prisoners some authority to manage certain aspects of prison life to make incarceration more humane. This idea was further developed into the Mutual Welfare League, which was started in Auburn prison in December 1913. The Mutual Welfare League grants prisoners more autonomy and includes them in decisions about some parts of the prison's day-to-day matters. The prisoners were involved in organizing sports and educational activities. A court run by prisoners was established to punish minor offences in prison. The underlying idea was that these measures would lead to a feeling of responsibility among the prisoners and ease their reintegration into society.

Martin H. Glynn, Sulzer's successor as Governor of New York, offered Osborne the position of warden of Sing Sing Prison after the previous warden was forced out of office for recurrent dishonesty accusations. Osborne hesitated to accept the position because Sing Sing faced numerous difficulties, and he felt like Clinton Prison was a better place to continue establishing the Mutual Welfare League. He discussed the offer with his friends and received a telegram from prisoners recently transferred from Auburn to Sing Sing, urging him to take the position because they would support him. After being promised the support of the newly elected Governor of New York, Charles S. Whiteman, Osborne officially accepted the position on November 19, 1914. On December 1, 1914, Osborne took office as Warden of Sing Sing prison. He implemented the Mutual Welfare League, which improved the conditions in the prison and made him popular among prisoners and prison personnel.

The book Society and Prisons: Some Suggestions for a New Penology is part of the “Yale Lectures on the Responsibilities of Citizenship”. The lectures were established by William Earl Dodge with the goal of promoting responsibility for the duties of Christian citizenship. Osborne was asked by Yale University to present his expertise on prisons and prison reforms.

=== The State of US prisons in the early 20th century ===
Most prisons at the time the book was written used either the Pennsylvania or the Auburn system. The Pennsylvania system was based on the idea that complete isolation would promote reformation. The prisoners were kept in solitary confinement, and their only interaction consisted of occasional contact with the guards. The Auburn system developed as an alternative to the Pennsylvania system and gradually replaced its predecessor. In the Auburn system, the prisoners worked during the day and were kept in solitary confinement at night. Silence was enforced at all times, and talking and other rule-breaking behaviors were severely punished.

The prisons in the US faced several challenges during the early 20th century. Societal and demographic, such as population growth, influx of immigrants, and urbanization, resulted in a growing prison population. The number of people in State and Federal prisons increased from approximately 30,000 to 68,000 between 1880 and 1910. Many prisons suffered from overcrowding, and the prisoners lived in small cells without proper ventilation and natural light. Diet and medical care were often inadequate, leaving the prisoners with significant health risks, such as rheumatism and tuberculosis.

== Contents ==
=== I – Crime and Criminals ===
In the book's first chapter, Osborne starts by examining the understanding of the terms crime and criminal. He emphasizes that while by definition, a criminal is simply someone who has committed a punishable offence, in reality, there are various unconscious associations when people hear the word criminal. The positivist school argues that criminals can be identified and distinguished from the general population by certain physical and mental characteristics, even before they commit any offence. Osborne opposes the positivist school and points out several flaws in the reasoning of its supporters. His main criticism is that it is meaningless to investigate the prison population without considering the general population. Osborne cites Charles Goring, who found no evidence for a criminal type in a study including over 3000 English convicts.

=== II – Courts and Punishment ===
The second chapter of the book discusses how the criminal justice system punishes offenders. Osborne identifies injustices in how offenders are caught and judged. For example, he states that the function of the police is only to catch the criminal, while in reality, they often form judgments and collect evidence in a biased manner. Osborne argues that this, together with injustices in court, leads to a feeling of being mistreated by society for many criminals. The author discusses the three objectives of imprisonment described by penologists at his time: retaliatory, deterrent, and reformatory. He argues that the focus should be on the reformatory aspect of prisons because retaliation only produces more hatred towards society, and deterrence is ineffective and does not stop criminals from committing an offence. According to Osborne, the problem of recidivism can only be solved by reforming criminals and treating them appropriately in prisons.

=== III – The Old Prison System ===
In the third chapter, Osborne examines the history and development of the prison system. He points out how the prison problem – the problem of recidivism – only arose after introducing imprisonment instead of capital punishment for most offences. He quotes statistics from England and the US showing that around two-thirds of criminals are recidivists to underline the seriousness of the problem. Osborne criticizes solitary confinement in prisons because of its adverse effects on the mental and physical well-being of the prisoners. He discusses his experience when he committed himself to prison for a week and describes how the conditions of the prisons at his time were inhumane and unfit to reform anyone.

=== IV – The Mutual Welfare League ===
The fourth chapter describes the implementation of the Mutual Welfare League at Auburn Prison in 1913. The Mutual Welfare League focuses on self-government and mutual responsibility among the incarcerated to promote rehabilitation and better conditions in prisons. Osborne believed that giving the prisoners more autonomy would make them more responsible and better adjusted for their reintegration into society. The Mutual Welfare League consisted of committees whose members were elected democratically by the prisoners. The committees organized activities, such as sports events, educational lectures, and entertainment. The Mutual Welfare League also introduced a prison court run by prisoners to punish minor offences.

=== V – The New Penology ===
In the last chapter, Osborne discusses the potential of the Mutual Welfare League as a solution to the prison problem. He describes how the League was implemented in Sing Sing in 1914 when he became the prison's warden. Osborne gives various statistics, such as the number of stab wounds inflicted and the number of emergency cases in the hospital, to underline how the Mutual Welfare League has improved the conditions in the Auburn prison significantly. He describes how the Mutual Welfare League could be expanded to other prisons but warrants that it can only work when the personnel has understood the underlying ideas of the League.

== Reception ==
Osborne's work, including Society and Prisons: Some Suggestions for a New Penology, had a significant impact on the prison reform movement of the early 20th century. He envisioned prisons as a place for rehabilitation instead of just punishment, which was well-received by those advocating for a more humane approach to criminal justice. His ideas of giving more authority and responsibility to the prisoners were cause for many discussions of the subject in the field of penology and the wider public. Initially, his proposals were met with scepticism and resistance, but Osborne worked hard to show their efficacy. In 1919, F. B. Enthoven reviewed Society and Prisons: Some Suggestions for a New Penology in an article in the Dutch legal newspaper Weekblad van het Regt. He underlined the book’s relevance and argued that Osborne’s ideas for prison reform could be implemented in Dutch prisons with promising results.

Osborne remained engaged in the discussion about prison reform after the publication of Society and Prisons: Some Suggestions for a New Penology. On October 16, 1916, Osborne resigned as warden of Sing Sing after being exhausted by the troubles caused by his political and ideological opponents. They interfered with his work at the prison and tried to sabotage him over multiple years. In January 1917, he spent a week as a voluntary prisoner in the Portsmouth Naval Prison. He noticed the same dehumanizing treatment and poor conditions that he observed during his week in Auburn in 1913. From August 1917 to March 1920, Osborne served as Lieutenant Commander in the US Navy, in charge of the Naval Prison in Portsmouth. During this time, he initiated the Mutual Welfare League at the prison and turned it into a place of education and reformation. Franklin D. Roosevelt, Assistant Secretary of the Navy at the time, and other Navy officials were impressed with Osborne's work at the prison. After his time at Portsmouth, Osborne took no further positions as a prison administrator. He continued to advocate for a focus on rehabilitation and humane conditions in public speeches and writing and investigated prisons in different parts of the country. Osborne founded "The National Society for Penal Information", which published an annual handbook on prisons, among various other prison and crime related publications. In 1924, Osborne published Prisons and Common Sense, in which he further endorses his ideas on prison reform.

The book Society and Prisons: Some Suggestions for a New Penology is recommended by California State University, San Bernardino in their comprehensive list of correctional educational literature. The book is praised as being "one of [Osborne’s] best presentations on the history of prisons and the principles of his New Penology". Osborne's work remains relevant as the US still faces high recidivism rates at the beginning of the 21st century. While the conditions in US prisons have improved significantly since the publication of Society and Prisons: Some Suggestions for a New Penology, the fundamental ideas of rehabilitation, social responsibility, and humane treatment of prisoners remain relevant in contemporary discussions about penology.
