= Austin MacCormick =

American criminologist and prison reformer

Austin H. MacCormick (April 20, 1893 - 1979) was an American criminologist and prison reformer.

== Early years ==
MacCormick was a native of Maine and a 1911 graduate of Boothbay Harbor High School. He graduated cum laude from Bowdoin College in 1915, winning the Brown Composition Prize and the Class of 1868 Prize. During the commencement exercises he presented "an earnest plea for 'A New Day for the Criminal'". He went to Columbia as holder of the Everett Fellowship from Bowdoin. In 1916 MacCormick received the Masters of Arts degree from Columbia University Teachers College. He served in the U.S. Naval reserve from 1917 to 1921. His senior officer at Portsmouth was Thomas Mott Osborne, a penologist who later employed MacCormick.

== Career ==
After being secretary for Bowdoin College's alumni council, MacCormick became executive officer at a naval prison in Portsmouth, New Hampshire. In 1929 he was appointed Assistant Superintendent of the Federal Prisons in the Department of Justice. In 1930, the Federal Bureau of Prisons was established and MacCormick was named Assistant Director. In 1933 he was acting director of the United States Industrial Reformatory in Chillicothe, Ohio. From 1934 to 1940 he served as Commissioner of the New York Department of Corrections. In 1939 he was President of the American Correctional Association. MacCormick was special assistant to the Undersecretary of War from 1944 to 1947. In 1940 he became the executive director of the Osborne Association. In March 1951 he was appointed professor of criminology at the University of California, Berkeley, a position that he held until 1960.

== Later years ==
When MacCormick retired from teaching at Berkeley, he worked full time as the executive director of the Osborne Association until his death in 1979.

In 1971, MacCormick served as co-chairman of the Goldman Panel, which was charge with conducting an impartial investigation of how Attica Prison inmates were being treated after the retaking of the facility following the uprising at the prison that resulted in a massacre of inmates and hostages by New York state troopers. MacCormick wrote a personal letter to Gov. Nelson Rockefeller, who had ordered the retaking of the prison by armed force, praising Rockefeller for his handling of the crisis. The Goldman Panel publicly reported that inmates were being well-treated, when, in fact, rampant abuse of inmates continuing well after the retaking had been reported to the panel by physicians.

MacCormick was influential in federal and state prison reform and worked with adult and juvenile prisons throughout the nation to help guide penology into the modern era. He served on committees concerned with alcoholism and drug use and wrote many papers expressing progressive ideas on prison reform, libraries, and juvenile delinquency.

MacCormick wrote a book based on the results of his 1928 nationwide survey of prison education, which was published in 1931 as The Education of Adult Prisoners: A Survey and a Program Prepared for the National Society of Penal Information. MacCormick dedicated the book to Thomas Mott Osborne.

In his book, The Education of Adult Prisoners it lists four goals for prison education:

- Fundamental academic education, designed to provide the intellectual tools needed in study and training in his everyday life.
- Vocational education, designed to give training for an occupation.
- Health education, designed to teach the fundamentals of personal and community healthy.
- Cultural education, embracing the non-utilitarian fields one enters for intellectual or aesthetic satisfaction alone.
- Social education, to which all other types of education and all the activities of the institution should contribute.

He summarizes his book by stating: "The typical prisoner is a young man or woman who needs education." He devotes a chapter to "Individualization of Education".

== Personal life ==
MacCormick married Gertrude Albion on Decembert 15, 1917, in Portland, Maine. They had two adopted children and were divorced in 1935. On January 6, 1936, he married Patricia Walsh Welling (widow of Joseph Welling) in Wyomissing, Pennsylvania.
