= Victor Folke Nelson =

Swedish-American author on prison reform

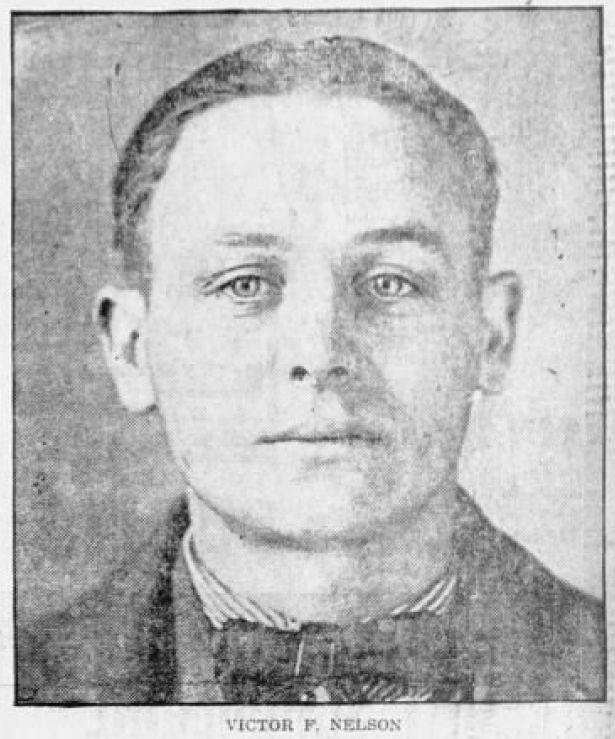
- Victor Folke Nelson, published in 1921 by the Boston Evening Globe
- Born: June 5, 1898; Malmö, Sweden
- Died: December 9, 1939 (aged 41); Boston, Massachusetts
- Occupation: Writer
- Years active: 1927–1933
- Notable work: Author of Prison Days and Nights

Victor Folke Nelson (June 5, 1898 – December 9, 1939) was a Swedish-American writer, prisoner, and prison reform advocate. He spent many years incarcerated in both the New York and Massachusetts prison systems and came to the attention of neurologist Abraham Myerson and penologist Thomas Mott Osborne for his potential as a writer. In 1932, Nelson published his book Prison Days and Nights with the assistance of Dr. Myerson.

== Early life ==
Victor Folke Nelson was born in Malmö, Sweden on June 5, 1898 to Anna Pehrson and Carl Nelson. Victor's parents emigrated to the state of Massachusetts, US, with him and his three siblings when he was three years old. The Nelson family struggled economically and Victor's mother died when he was seven years old. Victor spent the next six years in the Swedish Lutheran Orphanage of Massachusetts.

Orphanage records documented that Victor was bright but had difficulties constructively managing his boredom. He frequently ran away and was eventually placed in the Lyman School for Boys. He served in the British Royal Flying Corps from 1916 to 1918, then enlisted in the United States Naval Reserve in 1918.

== Incarceration ==
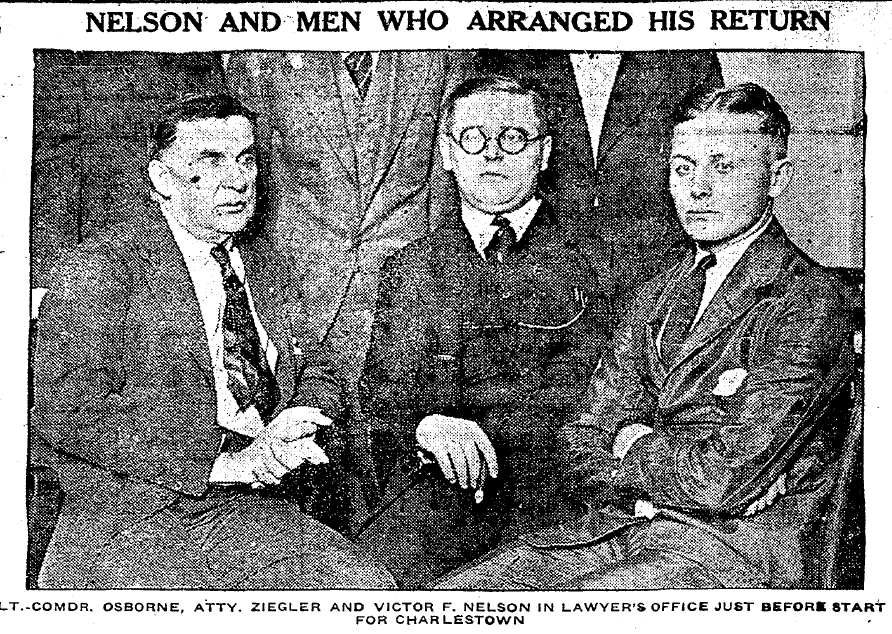
Thomas Mott Osborne, Attorney Edward J. Ziegler, and Victor Folke Nelson 1921

Victor Nelson's first charge of larceny occurred when he was 18 years old, but was discharged by a grand jury in New York City. He was incarcerated twice in the Portsmouth Naval Prison—punishment for his absence without leave—where he met and worked as an office clerk for then prison commander Thomas Mott Osborne. Nelson received a dishonorable discharge from the US Naval Reserve in 1920. He cycled in and out of various New York and Massachusetts prisons from 1920 to 1932, spending a total of 12 1/2 years incarcerated, primarily for robbery and larceny crimes. In May 1921, at age 22, Nelson made a sensational and highly publicized run and escape from Charlestown State Prison in Massachusetts. He spent some days planning his escape, even modifying a pair of prison-issued shoes, replacing the heavy soles with homemade felt soles to enable both speed and silent running. He made his break from a line of 13 prisoners after attending evening school in the prison chapel. Despite an attempted intervening tackle from a prisoner trusty and bullets from a guard's gun, Nelson ran some distance, leapt, caught the lower end of the window bars, and scaled the 40-foot high wall of the prison's Cherry Hill section. At the top of the wall, he performed "what was always believed an impossible stunt: throwing his body across a 10-foot space to the wall," where he managed to catch hold of the false coping of a small building in the corner where the south wing joined the main wall. The top of the false coping was too wide for him to grip with his fingers, but he managed to catch it with the crooks of his arms, regain his balance, and then topple over the outer wall to drop 30 feet down to the Boston and Maine railroad tracks, where two brakemen who saw him made no effort to stop him.

Nelson's friends gave him money for clothing and on the day of his escape Nelson joined a game of "scrub" baseball at Boston Common while authorities were searching for him. He remained in Boston for ten days, then traveled through Massachusetts, West Virginia, New York, and Pennsylvania before heading to Ohio. While in Pennsylvania he took a job selling enlarged photographs—work that he was able to continue doing for his employer as a traveling salesmen when worries about being detected by law enforcement made him eager to leave Pittsburgh—and he briefly stayed in East Liverpool, Ohio, due to interest in a local girl he had encountered on the train. After just a short time in East Liverpool, Nelson was nearly apprehended by a team of Pennsylvania and Ohio detectives, but he managed to escape across the state line into West Virginia where none of the detectives had jurisdiction to make arrests.

In August 1921, Nelson learned that Thomas Mott Osborne was touring the region to promote a film Osborne had sponsored, The Right Way, and would be speaking at a Cincinnati movie theatre. During his lecture, Osborne spoke about how the new Secretary of the Navy appointed by President Warren G. Harding had terminated the Mutual Welfare League program for prisoners that Osborne had started at Portsmouth Naval Prison, which was a program that had impressed Nelson deeply. Osborne also bemoaned those prisoners who had given innovative prison reform programs a bad name by failing to live constructively after release from prison. Nelson approached Osborne after the lecture, telling Osborne he felt regret for having been the type of prisoner who undermined public faith in Osborne's prison reform work. Nelson agreed to leave Cincinnati and return to Osborne's home in Auburn, New York. Nelson remained in Osborne's home for a week and then was accompanied by Osborne when he decided to turn himself in to Charleston Prison Warden Elmer E. Shattuck. At Nelson's subsequent resentencing trial, Osborne testified on his behalf and helped to persuade the judge not to add too much time to Nelson's sentence as extra punishment for having escaped, despite the protest of Warden Shattuck and the district attorney.

During a 1931 hiatus from incarceration Nelson lived with friends in New York, who expected Nelson would work as a writer. Nelson instead picked up odd jobs around the neighborhood, but "failed to do satisfactory work." Nelson's friends subsequently paid his way to Sweden in hopes of getting him out of the neighborhood setting, but Nelson was sent back to the United States by Swedish relatives after one month and soon recidivated. Throughout his years of incarceration and paroles, Nelson at times struggled with morphia addiction and excessive drinking, and he later published writing giving personal insight into the patterns of drug use and recidivism to which many prisoners fall prey. Nelson's final prison sentence was from 1930 to 1932, after which he paroled under the supervision of Abraham Myerson, though he would have additional encounters with the law in his troubled later years.

== Writing career and marriage ==
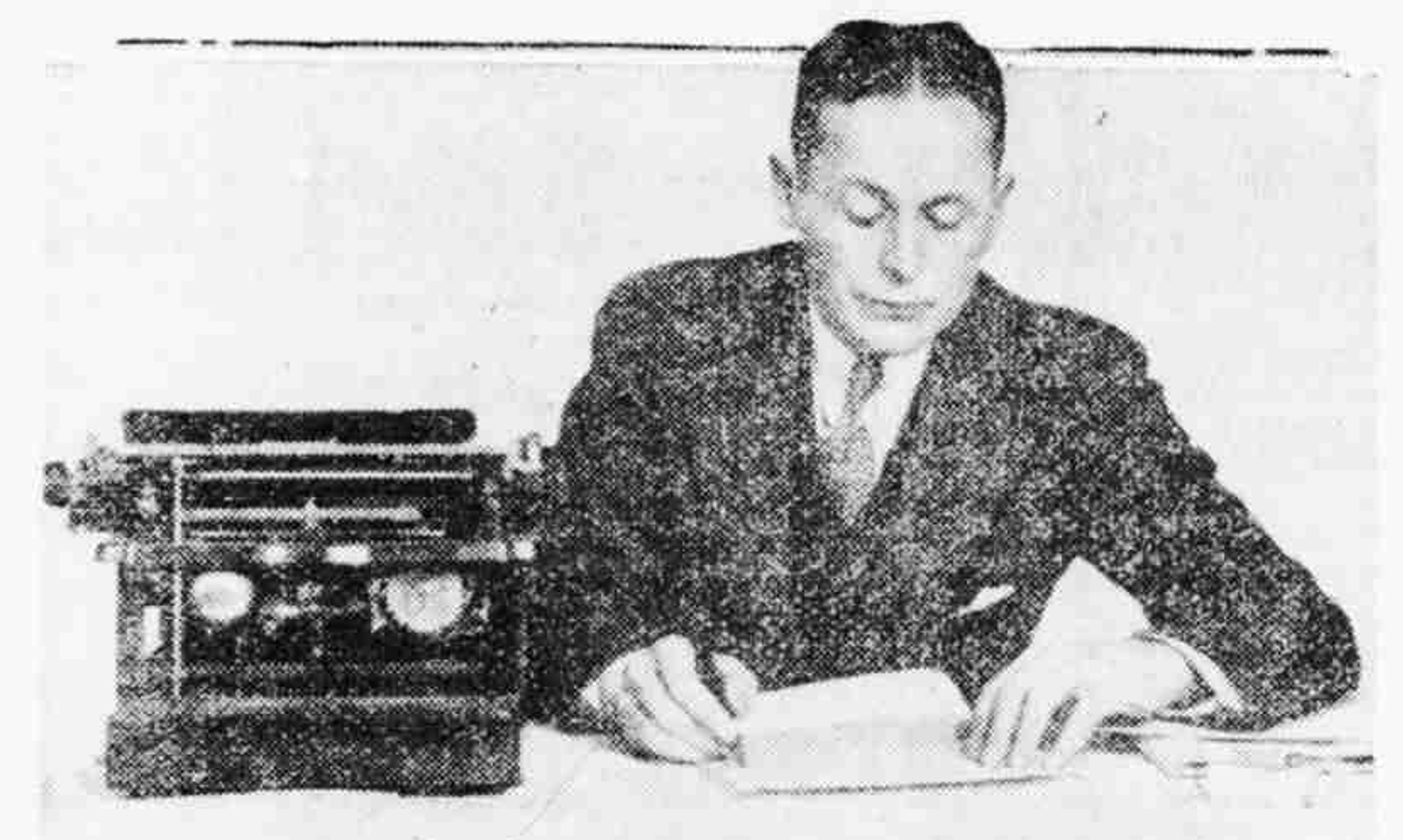
Victor Folke Nelson and his typewriter

Progressive prison official Thomas Mott Osborne and neurologist Abraham Myerson both recognized Victor Nelson's potential as a writer. Before being reincarcerated in 1924, Nelson had worked for Osborne as a librarian and literary assistant while on parole. In a series of articles entitled "In a Prison Cell I Sat," which Nelson wrote for The Boston Record from December 1932 to January 1933, Nelson credited Osborne for inspiring him to cultivate his intellectual pursuits, stating "...the more I read and studied, the stronger became my desire for the intellectual things in life." Osborne served as an informal academic advisor to Nelson, frequently sending him books and suggestions about courses of study. Nelson found his way to additional books through citations listed in the books Osborne sent him. Nelson also became interested in strengthening his skills in the written form of the Swedish language of his childhood, so he acquired the necessary reference books and practiced by translating Scandinavian stories into English. He sent some of these translations to a friend in New York, who then forwarded the translations to a magazine, which resulted in some of the translations being published. Nelson would later publish a piece in The Boston Record in which he would state: "I had always nursed a strong desire to write, and the translating proved to be the accidental means of making me a writer." Nelson easily learned foreign languages, and Boston news reporter Charles P. Haven once wrote that Nelson could "translate foreign books into sparkling English prose."

While incarcerated in the Auburn State Prison in New York, Nelson took Columbia University extension courses in writing and began publishing articles on penology. In 1930 he won a Writers' Club of Columbia University prize for his essay "Is Honesty Abnormal?" In 1929 he published a review on The Mårbacka Edition of the Works of Selma Lagerlöf in The Saturday Review of Literature. Nelson also cultivated skills in art and regularly illustrated criminology articles for local newspapers, including his own articles in The Boston Record. He had musical talent as well and worked as a pianist for the prison orchestra during his time at Charlestown State Prison. During the later years of his incarceration, Nelson taught prison evening school courses.

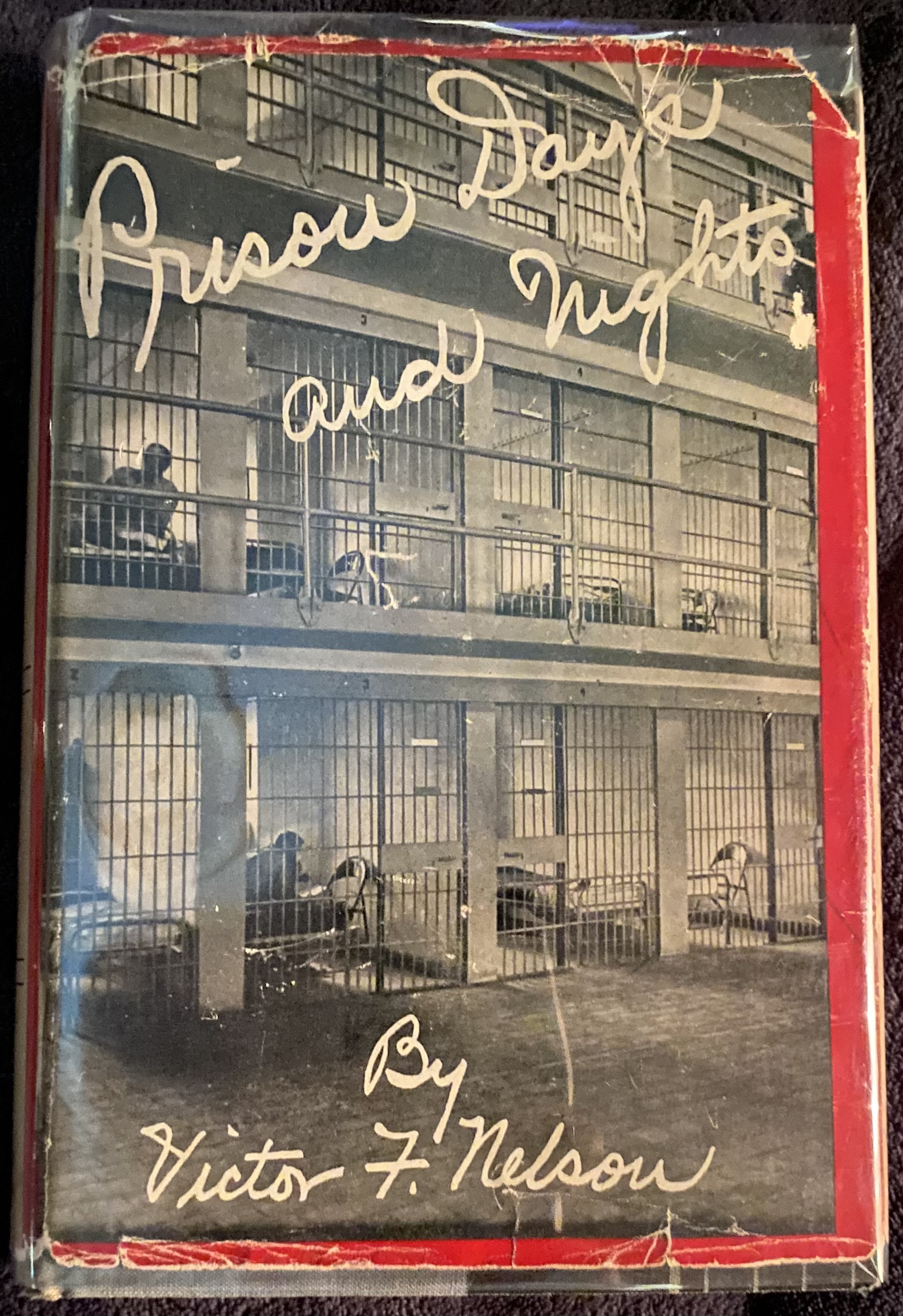
Cover of Prison Days and Nights by Victor Folke Nelson

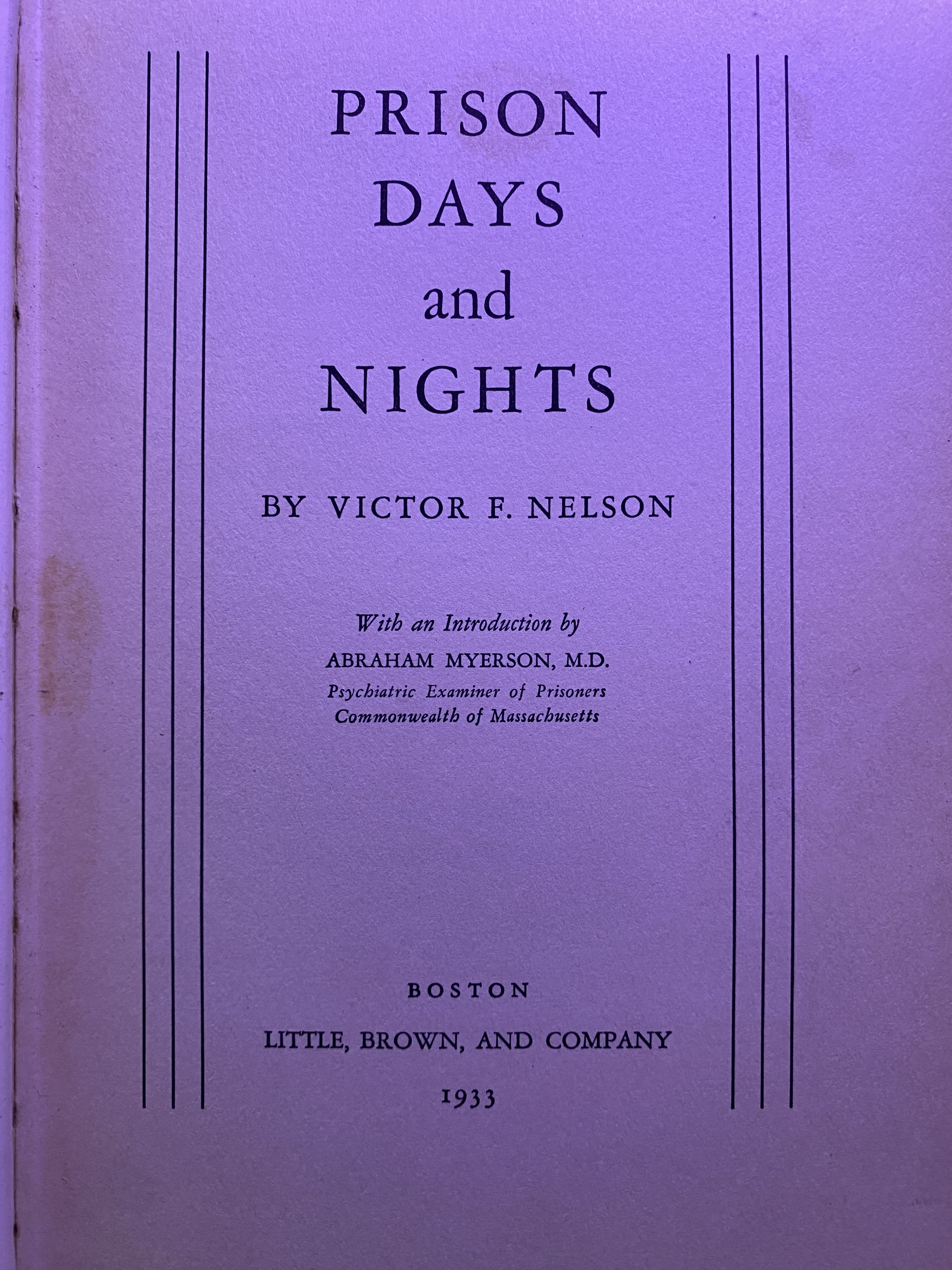
Title page of Victor Folke Nelson's Prison Days and Nights

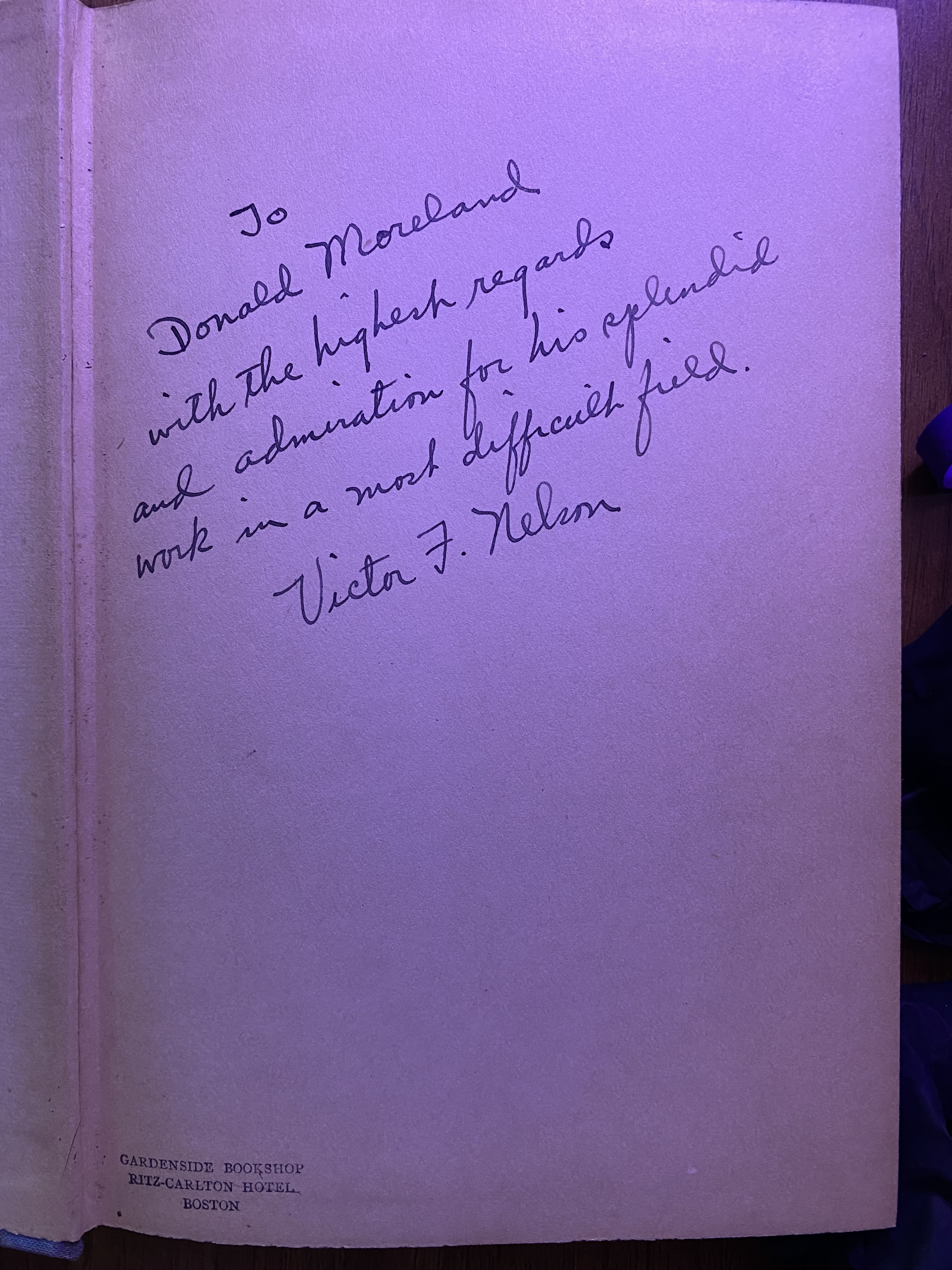
Inscription to Donald Moreland from Victor Folke Nelson in a copy of Prison Days and Nights. Book held by Harvard Houghton Library Offsite Storage, No. 2025-381

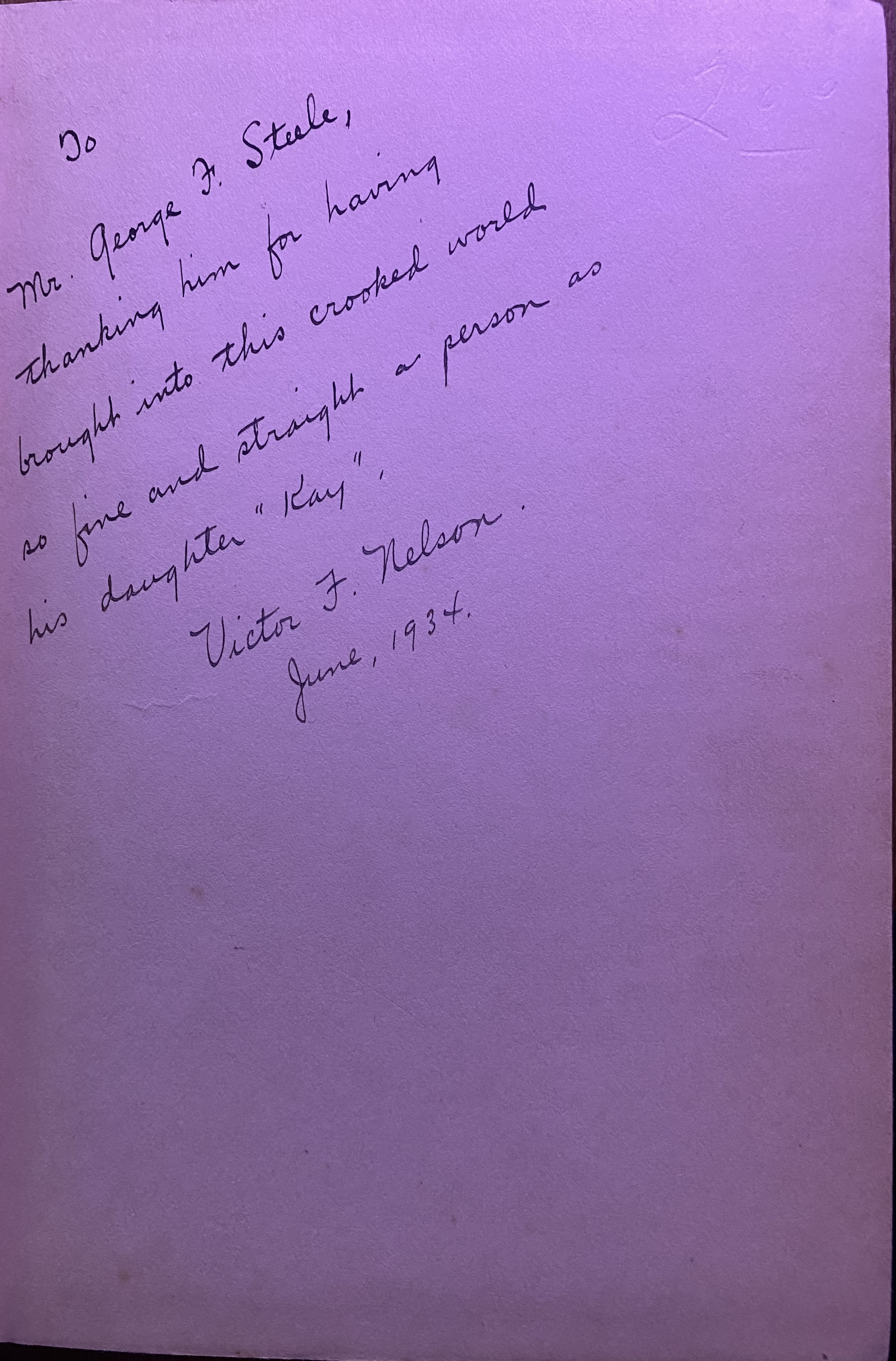
Inscription to George Steele from Victor Folke Nelson in a copy of Prison Days and Nights. Book held by Harvard Houghton Library Offsite Storage, No. 2025-382

In 1932, while Nelson was incarcerated in Dedham, Massachusetts, Abraham Myerson approached him and asked him to write something that would help psychiatrists understand how prisoners perceive those in the psychiatry profession. This piece of writing later became a chapter in Nelson's comprehensive book about prisoners' psychological experiences and prison reform in the United States, the first edition of which was published by Little, Brown, and Company in 1933 under the title Prison Days and Nights. The book was reviewed in newspapers across multiple states. In addition to commenting on the culture and language of prisoners, the book identifies, from the perspective of one who has lived within American prisons, the causes of continually high recidivism rates in a chapter called "Reforming the Criminal":

Now in all the years I have spent in various prisons, I have never seen a deputy warden or principal keeper who was not a promoted guard. ... I only know one who was even remotely capable of perceiving and attempting to perform this duty. ... Even when an occasional warden of a better type, spurred on, it may be, by an able, sincere prison commissioner, becomes a convert to the new faith and desires to lend a hand, he is rarely able to accomplish very much. Political interference, the opposition of ignorant but well-organized guards, the burdens of administrative detail work, the hostility of prisoners, personal inefficiency through lack of training; all these things render the warden more or less incapable of doing his higher duty toward society and toward the criminal. In the end, up against these and other difficulties beyond his powers of control, the average warden takes the easiest way out of his dilemma and lapses into a deliberate policy of laissez-faire. ... His chief concern is to produce good prisoners (men who cheerfully obey, or at any rate do not get caught breaking, prison regulations). Whether or not this is likely to make them good citizens when they are released does not greatly concern him. ... It thus comes about that wardens, as a group, due allowance being made for the rare exceptions, are incapable of anything beyond the mere literal execution of the court’s sentence. ... If, therefore, society is satisfied merely to punish the criminal, her wardens are eminently capable of performing the task. But if the declared purpose of imprisonment is actually the real purpose—if, that is, society’s real object is the reformation of the criminal—precious little progress will be made through the efforts of the present crop of wardens.

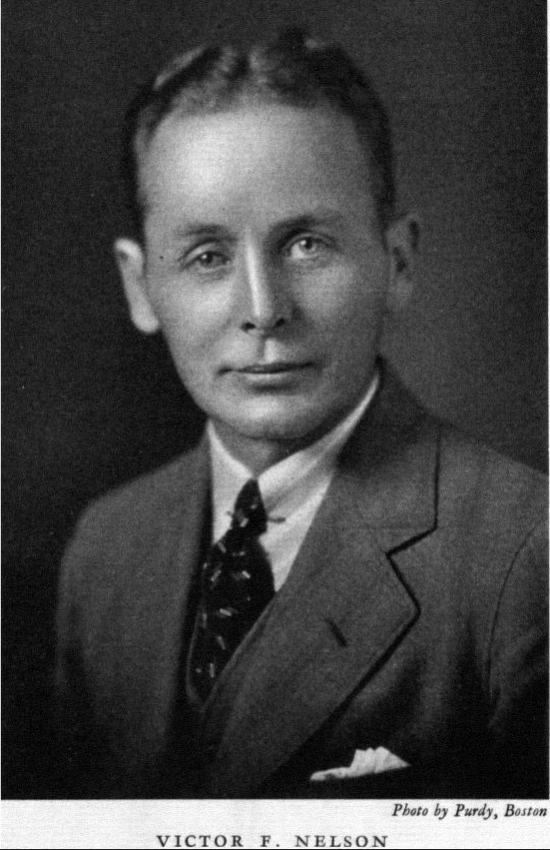
Victor Folke Nelson, author photo Prison Days and Nights

Nelson was paroled in August 1932 in the midst of the Great Depression. He married a nurse, Pearl Geneva Osborne, daughter of Adeline York and William A. Osborne, on February 27, 1934, in Exeter, New Hampshire, listing his occupation as "writer" on their marriage records. In the years after his release from prison Nelson sometimes wrote and published letters to the editors of various Massachusetts newspapers on the topics of prison policy and broader Great Depression era political issues. Nelson's publications would continue to be cited in 20th and 21st century criminal justice and sociocultural writing and research, though he would never complete the second book he had begun writing, which was on the topic of alcoholism and was to be called Mornings After.

== Later life and death ==
In 1936 Nelson suffered a broken neck in a car accident. After this injury, which caused him ongoing pain and discouragement, he struggled with depression and began drinking heavily. His wife, Pearl, remained a consistent support to him, despite his growing challenges. However, in August 1936 he was jailed for 30 days on a charge of drunkenness after Pearl filed a domestic violence complaint. In March 1937 he was sentenced by Judge Elmer Briggs of the Boston Plymouth District Court to Bridgewater State Farm (where chronic alcoholics were often sent at the time, and which later became the Bridgewater State Hospital) after assaulting an elderly neighbor while intoxicated. In August 1938 he appeared in Boston Municipal Court and pleaded not guilty to a charge of defrauding a hotel keeper and in November 1938 was arrested after getting into an automobile accident on Park Drive and fined $50 by the Roxbury Court for “operating a vehicle under the influence.”

On December 8, 1939, at the age of 41, Nelson phoned his wife after leaving home, telling her he intended to leave the state and that he was contemplating taking his own life. Nelson was found dead on December 9, 1939, in a room at the 66 Bowdoin St. boarding house in West End, Boston. Police had received a call from an anonymous woman who informed them that they "would find a man ill in the room." Police learned that Nelson had rented a room at the boarding house and that shortly after two women had visited him there. Police found lipstick-covered cigarette butts in the room, as well as a mostly full bottle of liquor and some liquor glasses, and they sought the two unidentified women for questioning. A chemical analysis of the liquids in the liquor bottle and glasses was ordered, and a determination of "barbiturate poisoning, manner not known" was entered into the City of Boston Registry Certificate of Death for Nelson.

Medical examiner William J. Brickley reported that Nelson had told three different people on previous occasions that he intended to take his own life using drugs. Brickley deemed the cause of Nelson's death "self ingestion of poison." Further investigation by Boston police Captain William D. Donovan and Sergeant Joseph Maraghy revealed that prior to his death, Nelson had registered and left two suitcases filled with writings, personal papers, and clothing at a house on Derne St. in West End Boston. Nelson had been writing a book on alcoholism at the time of his death, which was to be called Mornings After.

== Written and translation works ==
- "Is Honesty Abnormal?" (nonfiction article in Welfare Magazine, The Welfare Bulletin Official Publication of the Illinois Department of Public Welfare Printed by Authority of the State of Illinois, Vol. 18, 1927; reprinted in Copy . . .1930: Stories, Plays, Poems, Essays, Columbia University, University Extension, 1930)
- "The New Penology" (nonfiction article in Welfare Magazine, The Welfare Bulletin Official Publication of the Illinois Department of Public Welfare Printed by Authority of the State of Illinois, Vol. 19, 1928)
- "Code of the Crook" (nonfiction article in Welfare Magazine, Vol. 19, Issue 3, 1928)
- "Anne and the Cow" (English translation of Johannes V. Jensen's "Ane og Koen", 1928)
- "The Mårbacka Edition" (review of The Mårbacka Edition of the Works of Selma Lagerlöf in The Saturday Review of Literature, January 19, 1929, issue)
- "In a Prison Cell I Sat" (series for The Boston Record that ran in 24 instalments from December 1932 to January 1933)
- "Ethics and Etiquette in Prison" (nonfiction article in The American Mercury, December 1932, pp. 455–462)
- Prison Days and Nights (nonfiction book, 1933)
- "Prison Stupor" (nonfiction article in The American Mercury, March 1933, pp. 339–344)
- "Addenda to 'Junker Lingo'" (nonfiction article in American Speech)
