= Thomas Mott Osborne =

American prison officer and reformer (1859–1926)

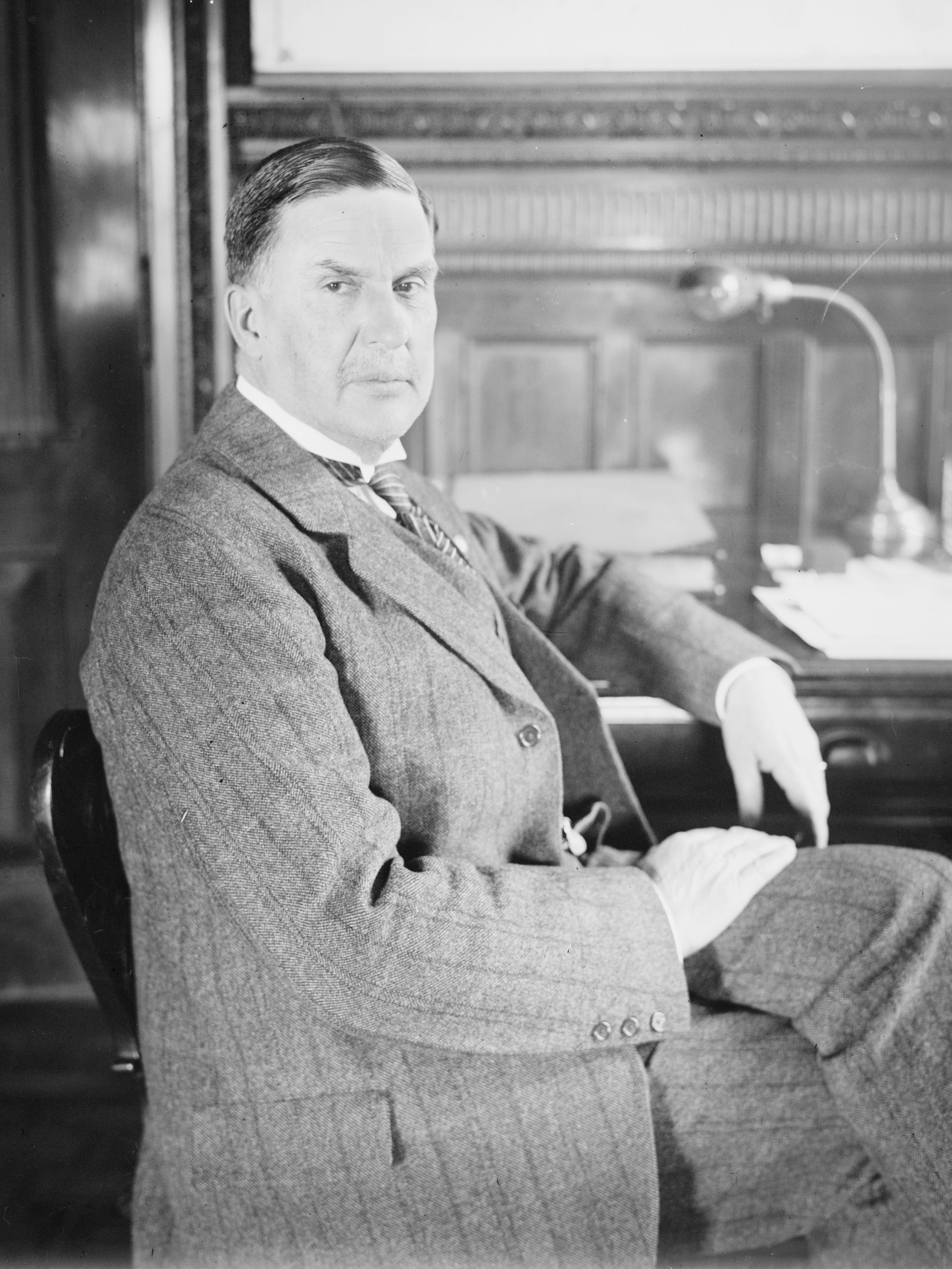
- Osborne, c. 1910

Warden of Sing Sing
- In office December 1, 1914 – December 31, 1915
- Appointed by: John B. Riley
- Preceded by: George S. Weed
- Succeeded by: George Washington Kirchwey

Personal details
- Born: September 23, 1859 Auburn, New York, US
- Died: October 20, 1926 (aged 67) Auburn, New York, US
- Spouse: Agnes Devens (m. 1886; died 1896)
- Children: 4, including Lithgow
- Education: Harvard University; Harvard Law School

Thomas Mott Osborne (September 23, 1859 – October 20, 1926) was an American prison officer, prison reformer, politician, industrialist, and New York State political reformer. In an assessment of Osborne's life, a New York Times book reviewer wrote: "His career as a penologist was short, but in the interval of the few years he served, he succeeded in revolutionizing American prison reform, if not always in fact, then in awakening responsibility.... He was made of the spectacular stuff of martyrs, to many people perhaps ridiculous, but to those whose lives his theories most closely touched, inspiring and often godlike."

== Early life ==
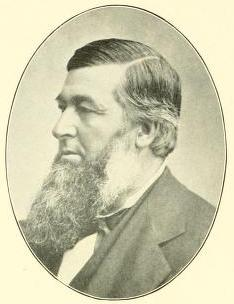
David M. Osborne (1822–1886), Thomas's father

He was born on September 23, 1859, in Auburn, New York, to David Munson Osborne (1822–1886) and Eliza Lidy Wright (1822–1886). Auburn was a center of progressive political activity, particularly anti-slavery activism before and during the American Civil War. His family included several eminent reformers, particularly his grandmother, Martha Coffin Wright and her sister, Lucretia Coffin Mott and his uncle William Lloyd Garrison, who were organizers of the 1848 Seneca Falls Convention on women's rights, with Elizabeth Cady Stanton, in Seneca Falls, New York.

His grandmother, Martha Coffin Wright, and in succession her daughter and Osborne's mother, Eliza Wright Osborne, and a niece, Josephine Osborne, oversaw the finances of Harriet Tubman, who spent her last half-century in Auburn. Martha's home in Auburn was part of the Underground Railroad where she harbored fugitive slaves. Both women frequented the Osborne household during Thomas Mott Osborne's upbringing. Thomas Osborne's aunt, Ellen, or as she is known to her descendants, Nella, married William Lloyd Garrison Jr., the son of the noted abolitionist William Lloyd Garrison. Thomas Mott Osborne's mother, Eliza Wright Osborne, wife of David Munson Osborne, was also a feminist leader, though of lesser note.

Thomas Osborne attended Adams Academy in Quincy, Massachusetts, and graduated from Harvard University with honors in 1884, where he was among the founders of the Harvard Cooperative Society.

== Career ==
=== Business ===
Upon David Munson Osborne's death in 1886, Thomas Osborne became president of his family's manufacturing company, D. M. Osborne & Co. By 1903, D. M. Osborne & Co. had grown to become North America's third largest producer of agricultural implements. In 1903, the family sold the company to the International Harvester Trust, leaving Osborne to pursue social reform and public service. International Harvester took over management in 1905.

In 1905, Osborne launched a daily newspaper, the Auburn Daily Citizen, as a progressive voice to counter the city's dominant daily, the Auburn Daily Advertiser.

=== Politics ===
Osborne served on the Auburn School Board from 1885 to 1896, becoming the youngest chairman in its history. In 1896, he became a trustee on the board of the George Junior Republic, a self-governing youth colony, and soon its chairman, just in time to lead a campaign to prevent New York State from shutting it down.

At the New York state election, 1898, he ran on the Independent Citizens' ticket for Lieutenant Governor of New York. Osborne was elected mayor of Auburn in 1902, serving two terms. He was known to disguise himself and visit local taverns to eavesdrop on conversations to get a sense of public opinion.

In 1907, Governor Charles Evans Hughes selected Osborne to serve as upstate commissioner on the state's first New York Public Service Commission. At one point, to determine whether railroads could safely trim staff as they proposed, Osborne dressed as a hobo and rode the rails. He was arrested by police in Syracuse, New York in the course of his sleuthing. His report to the commission, however, was instrumental in persuading the panel to maintain the existing railroad staff. However, his propensity to travel in a variety of odd disguises and his close relationship with Louis Schaedeline, a handyman with whom Osborne was rumored to be having a homosexual affair, proved fatal to Osborne's future political ambitions.

Between 1910 and 1912, Osborne teamed with Franklin Delano Roosevelt, then a New York State senator, and Louis McHenry Howe in unsuccessful efforts to reform the New York State Democratic Party. FDR, Howe, and Osborne were upstate New York's best-known foes of Tammany Hall and William Randolph Hearst. But after the 1912 national Democratic Convention, where the three worked for the presidential nomination of Woodrow Wilson, Wilson ignored their faction of the state Democratic party and instead selected the larger, Tammany Hall-led wing of the Democratic party to represent the state. Osborne quit politics in disgust.

=== Prison reform ===
In 1912, sick in bed, Osborne was inspired to read My Life In Prison by Donald Lowrie, a former inmate of San Quentin prison in California. The following year, he persuaded New York Governor William Sulzer to appoint him chairman of a new State Commission on Prison Reform. On behalf of the commission that year, he entered the Auburn Prison, now Auburn Correctional Facility, in prison garb, insisting to the administration that he be treated like any other prisoner. On September 29, Osborne began six days of imprisonment as "Tom Brown," Inmate 33,333X. He recorded his experiences in Within Prison Walls. Its publication in 1914 made him the most prominent prison reform crusader of his day.

=== Warden of Sing Sing ===
Osborne was appointed Warden of Sing Sing prison in Ossining, New York, on December 1, 1914, replacing Judge George S. Weed. After addressing the prisoners in chapel, he undertook a week's stay inside the prison, again experiencing the prison from the prisoners' point of view. He next stunned the guards and prisoners by visiting the prison yard unarmed and unescorted. He established a system of internal self-rule called the "Mutual Welfare League" within the prison and quickly won enthusiastic support from both guards and prisoners.

His principal opponents were prisoners who had lived comfortably within the system before his reforms, by intimidating others or using their financial resources to bribe guards for privileges. One of these, a former Manhattan banker in prison for larceny, used his financial and political connections to instigate a rigged "investigation" of Osborne's administration. When he was indicted for perjury, neglect of duty, and "unlawful [sexual] acts with inmates," Osborne fought back with a speaking tour of the state. Carnegie Hall saw two mass meetings supporting his defense, one attended by the retired president of Harvard University Charles William Eliot. The prison guards wrote a letter in support as well. After the judge in the case directed a verdict of acquittal, Osborne returned to Sing Sing in triumph. The front page of The New York Times described the celebration at the prison: "Convicts' Carnival Welcomes Osborne; Prisoners, in Costume and Wild with Joy, Give Pageant for Him at Sing Sing, Hundreds of Spectators."

He resigned his position as Sing Sing's warden later in 1916, tired of battling his superiors and New York State Governor Charles S. Whitman.

=== Commander at Portsmouth ===
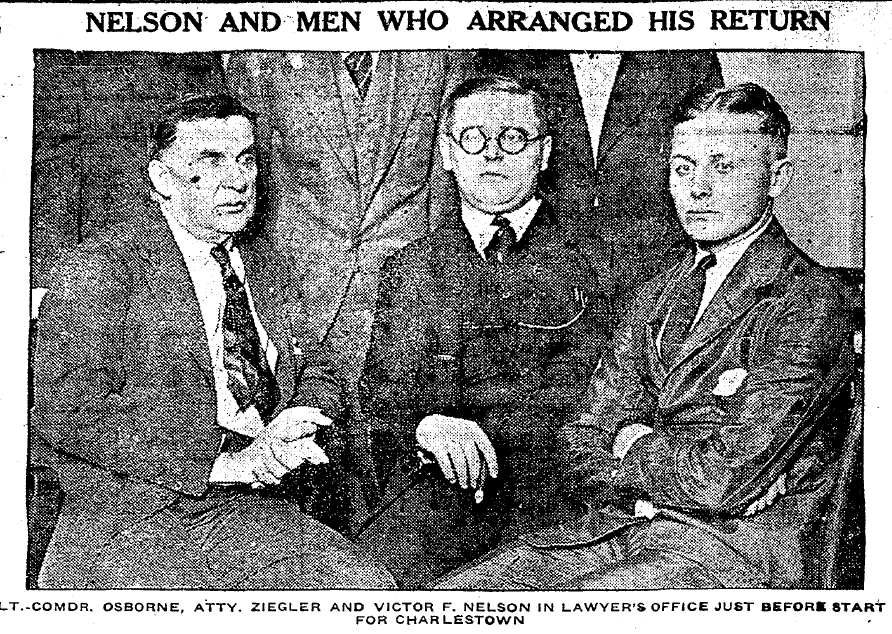
Thomas Mott Osborne, Attorney Ziegler, and Victor Folke Nelson 1921

In 1916 Josephus Daniels, the Secretary of the Navy at the likely suggestion of Assistant Secretary Franklin Delano Roosevelt, an ally of Osborne from his years in New York State reform politics, commissioned a report on conditions at the Portsmouth Naval Prison in Kittery, Maine. Osborne again investigated conditions by living inside the prison like any other inmate. He found a facility in desperate need of his reforms. In a speech at the Twentieth Century Club in New York City, he denounced "degrading" uniforms and "absurd" procedures: "When the men return from working on the seawall, a place where they could not possibly obtain anything but sand, boulders and seaweed, they are stripped and searched."

In July 1917, now a lieutenant commander in the U.S. Navy, he took up the position of commander of the Portsmouth Naval Prison, a post he held for two and a half years. It was during these years that Osborne, as a senior officer, met and mentored Austin MacCormick. Osborne also met and became a long-term mentor to prisoner and future author Victor Folke Nelson. In 1921, Osborne convinced Nelson to turn himself in after escaping from Charlestown State Prison in Boston.

== Later career ==
His books, public speaking, and notoriety helped end the so-called "rule of silence," floggings, and other prisoner abuses common in U.S. prisons at the time. But Osborne's cherished prisoner self-government plan, the "Mutual Welfare League," vanished soon after he died in 1926. His initial experiments had been greeted by the press largely with derision, but over the course of his life, he won grudging admiration from both the press and the public.

== Personal life ==
He married Agnes Lithgow Devens in 1886. His wife died of cancer just a few months after giving birth to their fourth son on March 26, 1896.

He died on October 20, 1926, in Auburn, New York. He was buried in Fort Hill Cemetery in Auburn dressed in a Portsmouth prison uniform.

== Legacy ==
"In the winter of 1936, ten years after the death of Thomas Mott Osborne, a massive bronze statue was dedicated in his memory in the hometown of Auburn. Twenty tons of Maine granite form the base for his commanding figure, which stands in front of the city high school. Notable Americans assembled; eulogies were made in praise of the pioneer."

Austin MacCormick would continue after Osborne's death in 1926 to publish his seminal work, "The Education of Adult Prisoners" in 1931. MacCormick would also become Dean of Criminology at U.C. Berkeley and executive director of Osborne Association, a prison reform organization still active to this day.

In 1933, the Welfare League Association and several other organizations Osborne had created were merged and reorganized as Osborne Association. The Association now works at every point of the criminal justice system, from arrest and "pre-entry," to programs in prison and in the community following release. True to Osborne's founding spirit, the Association's 25 programs are all designed to offer individuals the opportunity, the tools, and the support to build or rebuild their lives.

== Publications ==
- (1914) Within Prison Walls: Being a Narrative of Personal Experience During a Week of Voluntary Confinement in the State Prison at Auburn, New York at Project Gutenberg
- Society and Prisons (New Haven: Yale University Press, 1916)
- Prisons and Common Sense (Philadelphia: J.B. Lippincott Company, 1924)
