= Abraham Myerson =

American physician (1881–1948)

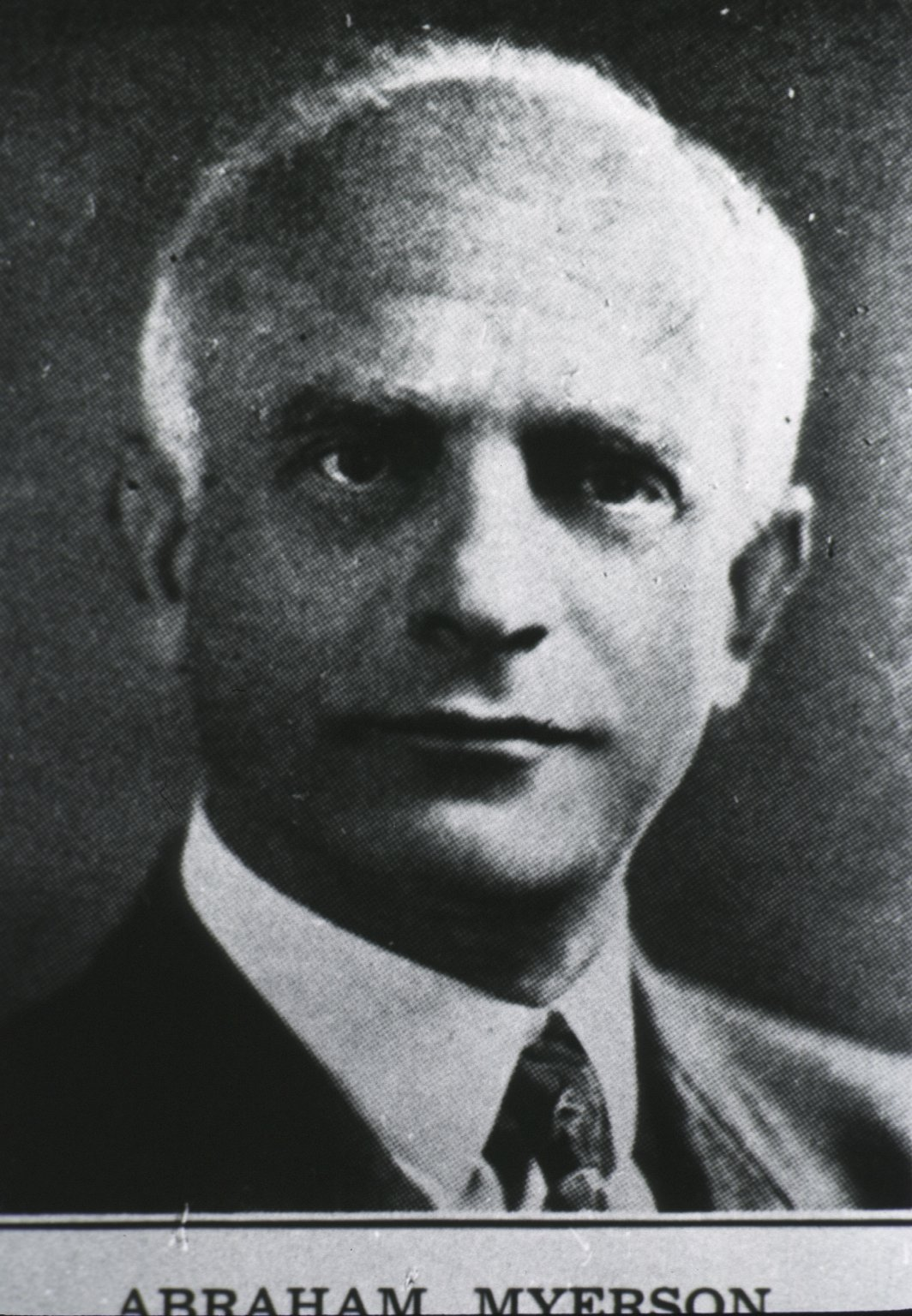
- Abraham Myerson
- Born: 23 November 1881; Jonava, Russian Empire
- Died: 3 September 1948 (aged 66); Boston, Massachusetts
- Occupations: Doctor, researcher

Abraham Myerson (1881–1948) was an American neurologist, psychiatrist, clinician, pathologist, and researcher. He had a special interest in the heredity of psychiatric and neurologic disease.

== Early life and education ==
Myerson was born in Jonava (present-day Lithuania), the son of a Jewish school teacher. His father emigrated to the United States in 1885, and sent for his family in 1886, settling in New Britain, Connecticut. In 1892, the family moved to Boston, Massachusetts. He attended the Boston public schools, graduated from high school in 1898, and then worked for seven years to earn money to attend medical school. He attended the College of Physicians and Surgeons of Columbia University for one year and then left for financial reasons. He worked as a street car conductor for a year, and then returned to Columbia for his second year. He transferred to Tufts Medical School in Boston, and graduated in 1908 with a M.D. At Tufts, Myerson was a student of Dr. Morton Prince, and in his later years, Myerson held the chair in neurology which had been Prince’s.

== Career as physician ==
He opened his medical office in Boston, and also served as an assistant physician in neurology at Boston City Hospital for two years. He spent six months in the neuropathology laboratory of Dr. Elmer E. Southard at Harvard University. He moved to St. Louis, Missouri for his residency in neurology at the Alexian Brothers Hospital and an instructor in neurology at St. Louis University.

He returned to Boston in 1912 to join the first group of residents at the newly opened Boston Psychopathic Hospital. From 1914 to 1918, he served as the clinical director and pathologist at Taunton State Hospital. In 1927, Myerson became director of research at Boston State Hospital. In 1933, the Massachusetts legislature approved the building of a new laboratory for Myerson with funds provided by the Rockefeller Foundation. In 1935, he was appointed professor of clinical psychiatry at Harvard Medical School in recognition of the accomplishments in his research. He was also appointed assistant professor of neurology at Tufts Medical School in 1924, and from 1921 to 1940, he served as the Chair of neurology at Tufts. In 1940, Myerson became Professor Emeritus.

During the first decades of the 20th century, the eugenics movement became prominent and widely supported by lay and professional groups. Myerson disagreed with the involuntary sterilization of feeble minded and mentally ill patients. While at Taunton State Hospital, he conducted a study and published his findings in The Inheritance of Mental Disease (1925), which showed that only ten percent of in-patients had a relative who had been confined to the hospital since its opening in 1854. Myerson believed that while there could be a heredity factor involved, social environment also played a major role.

=== Career as Massachusetts state forensic examiner ===
Myerson maintained an active practice and served as Massachusetts state forensic examiner for eight years. He testified at the trial of Sacco and Vanzetti. He was a supporter of electric shock therapy and taught its use. He believed in the interdependence of mind and body and a physiological approach in psychiatry and neurology. Myerson introduced “total push” in treating patients with chronic schizophrenic patients and affected by the regressive and iatrogenic treatment patterns in state mental hospitals. The growth of psychoanalytic practices in the United States interested Myerson. He thought that psychoanalysis led to the examination of human beings more closely and stimulated better research in the areas of biology and physiology. Though he appreciated Sigmund Freud’s contributions, Myerson opposed psychoanalysis.

In 1932 Myerson, in his role as Psychiatric Examiner of Prisoners for the Commonwealth of Massachusetts, mentored prisoner and author Victor Folke Nelson in publishing the book Prison Days and Nights about prisoners' psychological experiences and prison reform. Myerson wrote the introduction to Nelson's book, giving personal insight into penological theory from his perspective as a psychiatrist of prisoners.

=== Work with professional associations ===
Myerson was active in professional organizations: the American Psychiatric Association (representative to the National Research Council), the American Neurological Association, the Greater Boston Medical Society, the American Psychopathological Society (president, 1938-1939), the Advisory Council for Research in nervous and mental disease for the U.S. Public Health Service, and director of the Mental Hygiene Society. He published ten books and numerous scholarly research articles.

== Death and legacy ==
He died in 1948 of heart disease. The Infrequent Blinking Sign in Parkinson's Disease is named after him.

== Works ==
- Myerson, Abraham. The "Nervousness" of the Jew. Mental hygiene, vol. IV, no. 1, pp. 65-72, January 1920.
- Myerson, Abraham. The Nervous Housewife. Boston: Little, Brown & Co., 1920.
- Myerson, Abraham. The Foundations of Personality. Boston: Little, Brown, & Co., 1922.
- Myerson, Abraham. "Anhedonia, American Journal of Psychiatry (1 July 1922): 79, 87-103.
- Myerson, Abraham. The terrible Jews / by one of them.. Boston: Jewish advocate pub. co, 1922.
- Myerson, Abraham. The Inheritance of Mental Disease. Baltimore, MD: Williams and Wilkins Co., 1925.
- Myerson, Abraham. The Psychology of Mental Disorders. New York: Macmillan, 1927.
- Myerson, Abraham, and Roy D. Halloran. "Studies of the Biochemistry of the Brain Blood by Internal Jugular Puncture, The American Journal of Psychiatry 87(3) (10 November 1930): 389-406.
- Myerson, Abraham, Goldberg, Isaac. The German Jew: his share in modern culture. New York: A. A. Knopf . 1933.
- Myerson, Abraham. Social Psychology. New York: Prentice Hall, 1934. doi:10.1037/14518-000
- Myerson, Abraham, et al. Eugenical Sterilization" A Reorientation of the Problem. New York: MacMillan, 1936.
- Myerson, Abraham. "Neuroses and Neuropsychoses: The Relationship of Symptom Groups,American Journal of Psychiatry (1 Sept. 1936): 263-301.
- Myerson, Abraham. "The Attitude of Neurologists, Psychiatrists and Psychologists towards Psychoanalysis American Journal of Psychiatry 96(3) (November 1939): 623-641.
- Myerson, Abraham. "Human Autonomic Pharmacology XII. Theories and Results of Autonomic Drug Administration, JAMA 110(2) (Jan. 1938): 101-103. doi:10.1001/jama.1938.02790020015005
- Myerson, Abraham. "Further Experience with Electric-Shock Therapy in Mental Disease, The New England Journal of Medicine 227(11) (Sept. 1942): 403-407. doi:10.1056/NEJM194209102271103
- Myerson, Abraham. "The Sleeping and Waking Mechanisms: A Theory of the Depressions and their Treatment, Journal of Nervous & Mental Disease 105(6) (June 1947): 598-606. doi:10.1097/00005053-194706000-00004 PMID 20241659
- Myerson, Abraham. Speaking of Man. New York: Alfred A. Knopf, 1950.
