= Linda Gilbert =

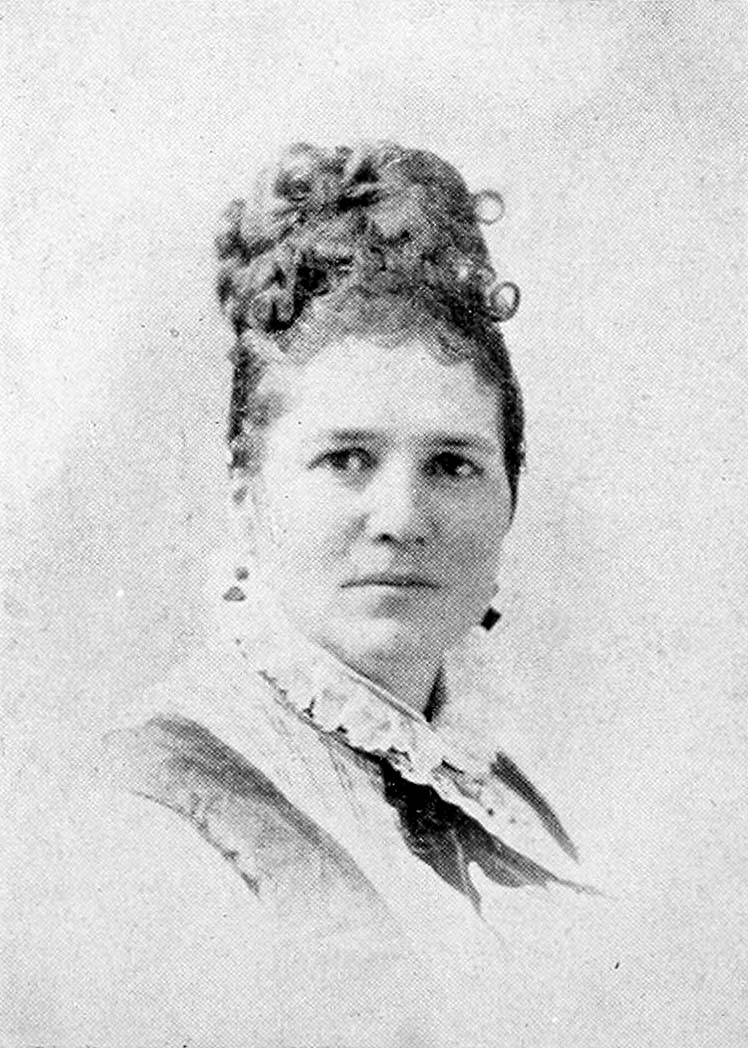
- Born: May 13, 1847; Rochester, New York
- Died: October 24, 1895 (aged 48); Mount Vernon, New York
- Known for: Prison education and reform campaigning, philanthropy

Linda Gilbert (13 May 1847 Rochester, New York – 24 October 1895 Mount Vernon, New York) was a prison reformer. Early in life, she became interested in efforts to improve the condition of prisons and prisoners, and endeavored “to remove the conditions that produce crime, by a wholesome system of industry and culture.” She succeeded in placing in various prisons libraries of from 1,500 to 2,000 volumes each, and aggregating 30,000 volumes.

== Biography ==
=== Early life ===
Gilbert was born in Rochester, New York. She moved with her family to Chicago, Illinois, though accounts conflict on the age at which this happened, with some specifying fifteen months, and others saying she was aged 4. She was educated there at St. Mary's Convent. Her home was opposite the jail of Cook County, Illinois.

At the age of 11, Gilbert lent some books from her grandfather's library to the prisoners there. At 15, she inherited money. When she was 17, she established the first county-jail library there, which featured 4000 books, several oil paintings and an organ for religious services.

Considering this work to be a success, Gilbert continued to work to establish libraries in prisons. She also had three "practical ladies" who worked for her, furnishing houses and procuring clothes, lodging and employment for released prisoners. In 1873, she spoke at the International Penitentiary Congress, citing statistics gathered from her research indicating that very few prisoners were literate or were provided adequate training in a trade to find employment after release. In 1877, Gilbert attended the National Prison Congress, again focussing on discharged prisoners.

Gilbert was compared with Elizabeth B Chase, who was appointed by the Governor of Rhode Island to be prison inspector and spoke at the international prisons congress.

=== Fundraising and continued campaigning ===
After spending $100,000 on philanthropy, the remainder was lost in a bank failure, and her philanthropic efforts required much more effort.

Gilbert developed several entrepreneurial projects as a source of funds for her philanthropic projects. She patented several devices, including a noiseless rail for railroads, and a wire clothes-pin, and established Linda Gilbert's Tax and Trade Record.

In 1876 the Gilbert Library and Prisoners' Aid Society was incorporated under the laws of the state of New York, and Gilbert became president of its board of managers. The objects of the Society were to improve prison discipline, to place libraries in every prison and jail in the country, to look after the prisoner's family if in need and worthy of aid, and to help convicts to lead upright lives after their discharge. Although lack of funds prevented the Society from doing any work after 1883, Gilbert continued to labor as an individual. In 1883 and 84, Gilbert was a regular visitor to Alexander Jefferson, who was tried and convicted of murdering two and attempting to murder his girlfriend and brother in what became known as the Crow Hill Murders. There were various appeals to reverse his death sentence, on 1 August 1884, he was killed in a badly managed and drawn-out hanging.

In 1886, Gilbert proposed an extension to the Brooklyn Bridge, only two years after it had opened. She suggested glass elevator columns be attached to the bridge towers, so that visitors could ascend to an observatory and look out over the city. She proposed that a small fee be charged for this, of which three quarters would go to the bridge's upkeep, and the other quarter would fund her charity work. The bridge's trustees considered but did not take up Gilbert's proposal.

In all, she established 22 libraries in six states. In Lincoln, Nebraska, her books were a means of educating 18-20 Native Americans who were sentenced to long terms. She procured employment for 6,000 ex-convicts, over 500 of whom she started out as peddlers, furnishing them with outfits worth $3–$5; all this was accomplished with less than 10% recidivism. She felt society more responsible than the criminal for crime.
