= Donald Lowrie =

American journalist and author (1875–1925)

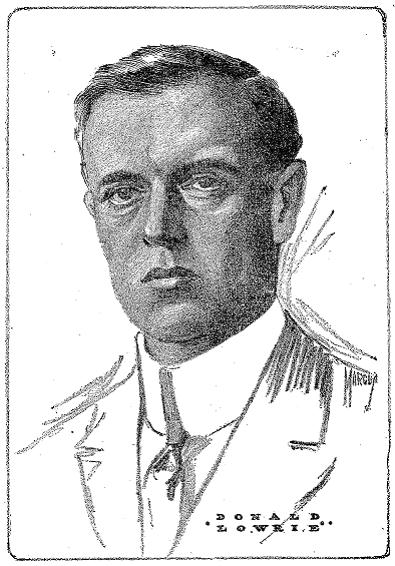
- Lowrie in 1912
- Born: Charles Donald Lowrie; March 26, 1875; Pennsylvania, United States
- Died: June 24, 1925 (aged 50); Phoenix, Arizona
- Occupations: Newspaper writer, author

Donald Lowrie (March 26, 1875 – June 5, 1925) was an American newspaper writer and author. He became a well-known advocate of prison reform work after the release of his book My Life in Prison, in which he reflects on his ten-year incarceration in San Quentin State Prison north of San Francisco, California.

== Biography ==
=== Early life ===
Charles Donald Lowrie was born in Pennsylvania on March 26, 1875. Accounts of Lowrie's life prior to imprisonment are scarce; he held various jobs ranging from bookkeeping and stenography to working as a traveling salesman.

Eventually, Lowrie was out of money and without shelter. After three days, Lowrie had exhausted his resources in looking for work and determined that either suicide or crime was the only way out. Having a nickel in his pocket, he decided to flip a coin. If tails, Lowrie, living in San Francisco at the time, would throw himself into the San Francisco Bay; if heads, Lowrie would commit a crime. The coin turned heads and two hours later Lowrie found himself entering the house of a well-to-do family, stealing a sleeping man's watch and a purse containing sixty dollars. Within a short time, Lowrie was arrested for burglary and sent to jail.

=== Conviction and imprisonment ===
Convicted of burglary, Lowrie was sentenced to fifteen years in San Quentin State Prison, where he remained for ten years until his early release on good behavior in 1911. Another five years of parole ahead, Lowrie started to write down his prison story under the auspices of the San Francisco Bulletin.

=== Literary works ===
Lowrie's best known literary work, My Life in Prison, was published in 1912. Stories in the book were not self-glorifying but rather plain and descriptive accounts of life in prison. Lowrie's simple writing style helped in obtaining confidence and understanding among his audience. The portrayal of the desolate and humiliating conditions prisoners had to face at the time was a central theme.

In 1912, Lowrie also joined the lecture circuit, traveling from community to community and talking about his life in prison.

My Life Out of Prison was Lowrie's sequel, published in 1915, describing his struggle to readjust after being released from prison.

With his writings, Lowrie is said to have inspired Thomas Mott Osborne, an industrialist from New York, in prison reform work. During Osborne's wardenship at the Sing Sing Correctional Facility, Lowrie even visited and helped institute new methods.

His writings are also said to have been one of the causes of capital punishment laws of the time being repealed. In addition, a bureau for the relief and guidance of ex-convicts was opened at his suggestion. Lowrie persistently voiced his dissatisfaction with the existing system of punishment. According to him, "punishment was [not] a discovered cure for human weakness."

== Family ==
On December 4, 1917, Lowrie married twenty-five-year-old Mildred Irene Dean in Brooklyn, New York. Mildred Lowrie, a native of Danbury, Connecticut, bore him one son, Charles Donald Lowrie Jr. (1918–1957).

=== Death and legacy ===
After serving a few months for another burglary conviction, Lowrie was released on parole from Arizona Penitentiary. Two weeks later, on June 24, 1925, he died at the Phoenix, AZ home of a local architect, R. B. Dick Redington, who housed him at the time.

With My Life in Prison, Lowrie defined a new category of writing which tried to make a connection between the failure of individuals and their social class, thereby presaging some of the writings of black radicals of the 1960s and 1970s.
