= Osborne Association =

Prison reform charity in New York

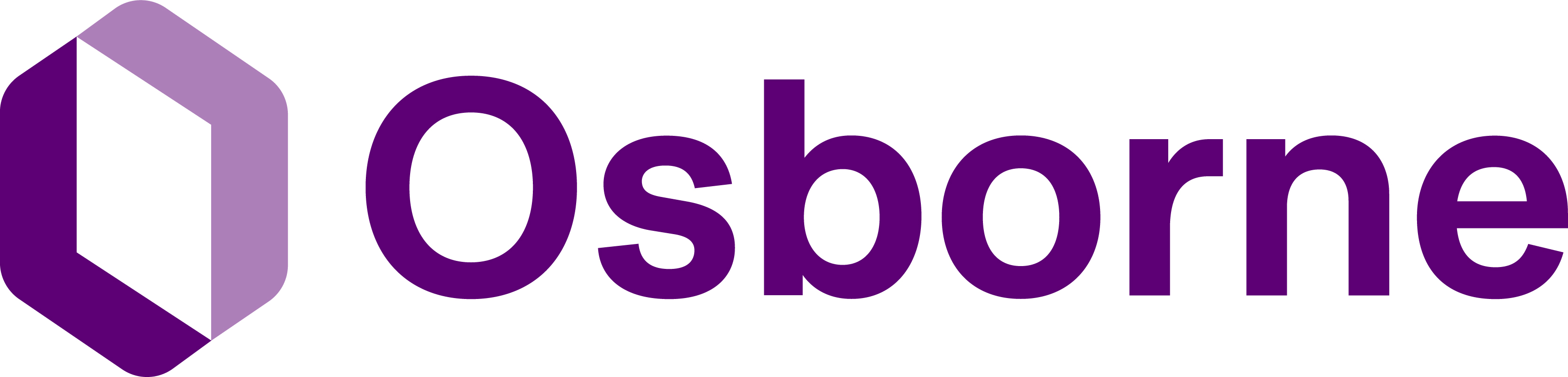
- Named after: Thomas Mott Osborne
- Predecessor: Mutual Welfare League and the National Society of Penal Information
- Merged into: Osborne Association in 1933
- Headquarters: Bronx, NY
- Location(s): Brooklyn, The Bronx, Buffalo, Newburgh, Troy, and White Plains, New York
- Website: www.osborneny.org

Osborne Association is a New York-based nonprofit that provides direct services to individuals and families affected by incarceration and advocates for criminal justice reform. Osborne has offices throughout New York—including Brooklyn, The Bronx, Buffalo, and Newburgh, White Plains, and Troy—as well as operations inside nearly all New York State prisons and New York City jails. Osborne's direct services include court advocacy and diversion programs; parenting classes, visiting, and family support; reentry and workforce development; and housing programs for people returning from long-term incarceration. Its advocacy focuses on decarceration, the rights of children and families with incarcerated loved ones, older adults in prison, and the expansion of housing options.

== History ==
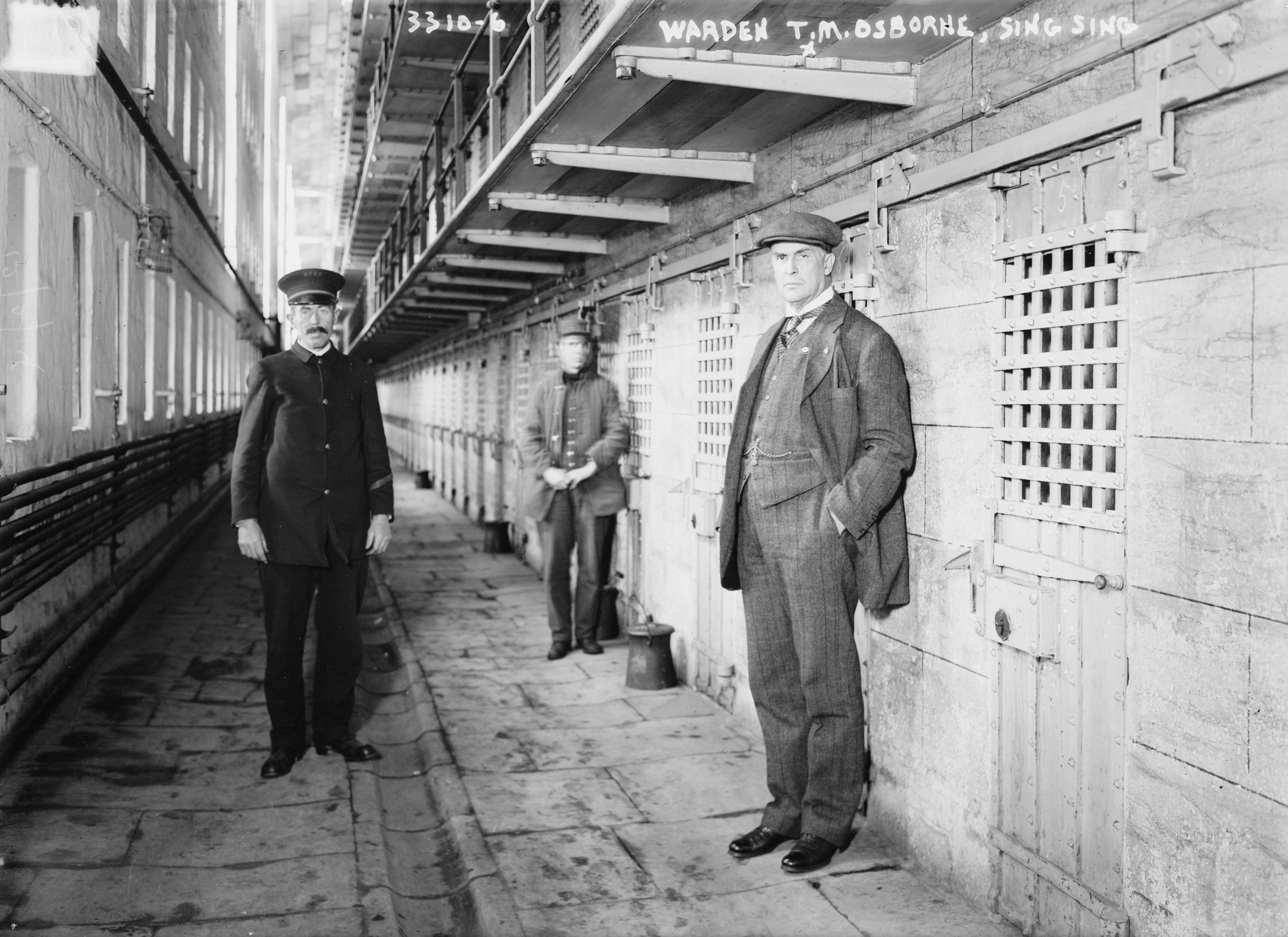
Sing Sing prison, with warden T. M. Osborne and two other men, about 1915

In 1913, Thomas Mott Osborne, an industrialist and former mayor of Auburn, New York, voluntarily spent a week in prison. After his experience, Osborne committed himself to reforming the American prison system from society's "scrap heap into a human repair shop," to emphasize rehabilitation rather than punishment.

Dedicated to the idea of a criminal justice system that "restores to society the largest number of intelligent, forceful, honest citizens," Osborne went on to become a progressive warden at Sing Sing Correctional Facility, where the majority of the individuals released did not return to prison after finishing their sentences. Osborne also established the Mutual Welfare League and the National Society of Penal Information. The two organizations merged to form Osborne Association in 1933 to continue Osborne's work. Under the guidance of Austin H. MacCormick, a protégé of Osborne known as the “father of correctional education,” the association pushed for education, rehabilitation, and humane conditions across the nation's prisons. For nearly four decades, MacCormick led Osborne in exposing inhumane practices and advocating for meaningful change.

== Leadership ==
Jonathan Monsalve became the president and CEO of the Osborne Association in October 2024, after joining the organization as chief strategy officer in June 2023. Monsalve previously served as the executive director of the Immigrant Defense Project, a national nonprofit focused on resisting mass deportation and immigrant incarceration. Before that, he was director of Brooklyn justice initiatives at the Center for Justice Innovation. Monsalve succeeded Archana Jayaram, who served as president and CEO from April 2022 to February 2024. Prior to that, Elizabeth Gaynes led the organization from 1984 to 2022. During her tenure, Osborne grew into New York's leading provider of family-focused services to individuals affected by the criminal justice system.

== Programs ==
Osborne Association has grown into a multi-service organization that addresses the needs of individuals who interact with the criminal justice system from arrest through reentry. Osborne operates more than 25 programs, including advocacy at court, healthy parenting and relationships, release planning, employment readiness, youth leadership and recreation programs, and transitional and permanent supportive housing.

== Advocacy ==
Working alongside Osborne's programs in jails, prisons, courtrooms, and communities, the Osborne Center for Justice Across Generations advocates for a justice system that recognizes every person's capacity to change and fosters safety and healing across generations. OCJAG's activities include collaborative advocacy with community-based and grassroots groups; research, policy analysis, and public education; and training and technical assistance focused on the impact of arrest and incarceration on children and families.
